= Ramon Bejarano =

American-born Catholic bishop

His Excellency, The Most Reverend Ramon Bejarano
- Bishop of Monterey in California
- Diocese: Monterey in California
- Appointed: December 17, 2025
- Installed: February 19, 2026
- Predecessor: Daniel E. Garcia
- Previous posts: Auxiliary Bishop of San Diego and Titular Bishop of Carpi (2020-2026)

Orders
- Ordination: August 15, 1998 by Donald Montrose
- Consecration: July 14, 2020 by Robert W. McElroy, Gustavo García-Siller, and Myron J. Cotta

Personal details
- Born: July 17, 1969 (age 57) Laredo, Texas, US
- Education: Diocesan Seminary of Tijuana; Mount Angel Abbey
- Motto: My soul is thirsting for you

Styles of Ramon Bejarano
- Reference style: His Excellency; The Most Reverend
- Spoken style: Your Excellency
- Religious style: Bishop

Ramon Bejarano (born July 17, 1969) is an American prelate of the Roman Catholic Church who has been bishop of the Diocese of Monterey since 2026. He was ordained a priest for the Diocese of Stockton in 1998 and later served as an auxiliary bishop for the Diocese of San Diego from 2020 to 2026.

== Biography ==
=== Early life ===
Ramon Bejarano was born in Seagraves, Texas on July 17, 1969, to José Bejarano and María Elena Silva. Early in life, Bejarano's family moved to Juan Aldama, Chihuahua, in Mexico. At the age of 7, Bejarano encountered his vocation to the priesthood through the Eucharist. In 1987, when he was 18, the family relocated to Tracy, California. Bejarano worked there sorting tomatoes and as a hotel janitor.

At age 20, Bejarano applied to become a seminarian with the Diocese of Stockton. He first entered the Diocesan Seminary of Tijuana in Tijuana, Mexico, earning a Master of Philosophy degree in 1992. He completed his seminary studies in 1998 with a Master of Divinity degree from Mount Angel Abbey in Saint Benedict, Oregon.

=== Priesthood ===
On August 15, 1998, Bejarano was ordained a priest for the Diocese of Stockton at the Cathedral of the Annunciation by Bishop Donald Montrose.

The diocese assigned Bejarano as parochial vicar at St. George Parish in Stockton. In 2004, he was transferred to the same role at Sacred Heart Parish in Turlock, California. When the diocese founded Holy Family Parish in Modesto in 2005, Bejarano was named its founding pastor.

In 2009, Bejarano was appointed pastor of St. Stanislaus Parish in Modesto, where he served for eleven years. In 2019, Bejarano was transferred to the Cathedral of the Annunciation Parish in Stockton.

During his tenure in Stockton, Bejarano served as chaplain to the Migrant Ministry, celebrating mass for families and workers in migrant camps, providing the sacraments and counseling. He served as the spiritual director for the Spanish Catholic Radio in the area. He was a member of the presbyteral council, the diaconate board, the preparatory commission for the Diocesan Synod of 2005, and the college of consultors.

=== Auxiliary Bishop of San Diego ===
Coat of Arms as Auxiliary Bishop of San Diego

Pope Francis appointed Bejarano as auxiliary bishop of San Diego and titular bishop of Carpi on February 27, 2020.

His episcopal consecration, initially scheduled for April 21, 2020, was postponed due to the COVID-19 pandemic. He was consecrated at the Immaculata Church in San Diego on July 14, 2020, by Bishop Robert W. McElroy in a liturgy celebrated in English, Spanish, and Latin. Archbishop Gustavo García-Siller and Bishop Myron J. Cotta served as co-consecrators. He was the second Hispanic appointed as a bishop in San Diego, following Bishop Gilbert Chavez.

Bejarano is regarded as pro-life, having attended the marches for life in both Los Angeles and San Diego while an auxiliary bishop. He also served as the keynote speaker for an October 2024 pro-life ministry's 30th anniversary.

In both 2024 and 2025, Bejarano celebrated the Diocese of San Diego's annual "All Are Welcome" mass for LGBTQ Catholics, immigrants, and other minority groups. During the 2024 mass, Bejarano quoted Pope Francis and apologized for the "stigmatization and trauma" caused LGBTQ Catholics by the Catholic Church. Bejarano celebrated these masses after attending a workshop organized by New Ways Ministries. Mayor Todd Gloria called Bejarano's preaching in 2025 an "empowering message".

On February 9, 2025, Bejarano helped lead a prayer vigil for immigrants after a days-long protest against Donald Trump. The Union-Tribune quoted him as saying: "I pray in your name, gracious and loving God, that any evil and spirit of hatred be destroyed here and in every federal building." Bejarano also participated in a June 2025 protest at the Edward J. Schwartz Courthouse along with over a dozen other clergy. The building serves as a local ICE field office and DOJ immigration court.

While an auxiliary in San Diego, Bejarano served as vicar for ethnic and intercultural ministries; for life, peace, and justice; and for ecumenical and interreligious affairs.

=== Bishop of Monterey ===
On December 17, 2025, Pope Leo XIV named Bejarano bishop of Diocese of Monterey in California. Bejarano succeeds Bishop Daniel E. Garcia, who had been moved to the Diocese of Austin. In an interview about his appointment, Bejarano emphasized his desire to minister to immigrants. He was installed on February 19, 2026.

== See also ==
- Catholic Church hierarchy
- Catholic Church in the United States
- Historical list of the Catholic bishops of the United States
- List of Catholic bishops of the United States
- Lists of patriarchs, archbishops, and bishops
