= Sexual abuse scandal in the Roman Catholic Diocese of Stockton =

Sexual abuse cases in California, United States

The sexual abuse scandal in Stockton diocese is a significant episode in the series of Catholic sex abuse cases in the United States and Ireland.

== Oliver O'Grady affair ==
In 1984, a Stockton police investigation into sexual abuse allegations against Oliver O'Grady was reportedly closed after diocesan officials promised to remove the priest from any contact with children. Instead, he was reassigned to a parish about 50 miles (80 km) east, in San Andreas, by Mahony where he continued to molest children. Mahony, under oath, denied knowing of O'Grady's activity despite evidence to the contrary. During one particular line of questioning, Mahony was asked why he claimed not to remember multiple allegations of rape by one of his own subordinates (O'Grady) when he was the Bishop of Stockton. Mahony was advised by his attorney not to answer the question.

== Challenging investigations into abuse ==
In a later matter regarding the Los Angeles Archdiocese, Bishop Roger Mahony appealed an attempt to gain access to church documents relating to sexual abuse all the way to the Supreme Court. The Court refused to hear the appeal, and the decision required the archdiocese to comply with a subpoena from the Los Angeles County District Attorney for letters to the former priests and notes from counseling sessions conducted by the church.

== Deliver Us from Evil ==
The 2006 documentary Deliver Us from Evil is based on accusations that Mahony, while serving as Bishop of the Roman Catholic Diocese of Stockton, knew that Oliver O'Grady, a priest who sexually abused children, including a nine-month-old baby, in a string of Central California towns for 20 years, was a child molester but failed to keep him away from children. In Deliver Us from Evil, O'Grady says Mahony was "very supportive and very compassionate and that another situation had been smoothly handled". Mahony denies knowing that O’Grady was a child molester. However, the documentary provided copies of letters between Mahony and O'Grady during this time. The letters also were a subject of discussion in Mahony's deposition in a civil lawsuit related to O'Grady.

== See also ==
- Abuse
- Child abuse
- Child sexual abuse
- Religious abuse
- Sexual abuse
- Sexual misconduct
- Spiritual abuse
