= Stephen Blaire =

American Catholic bishop (1941–2019)

His Excellency, The Most Reverend Stephen Edward Blaire
- Bishop of Stockton
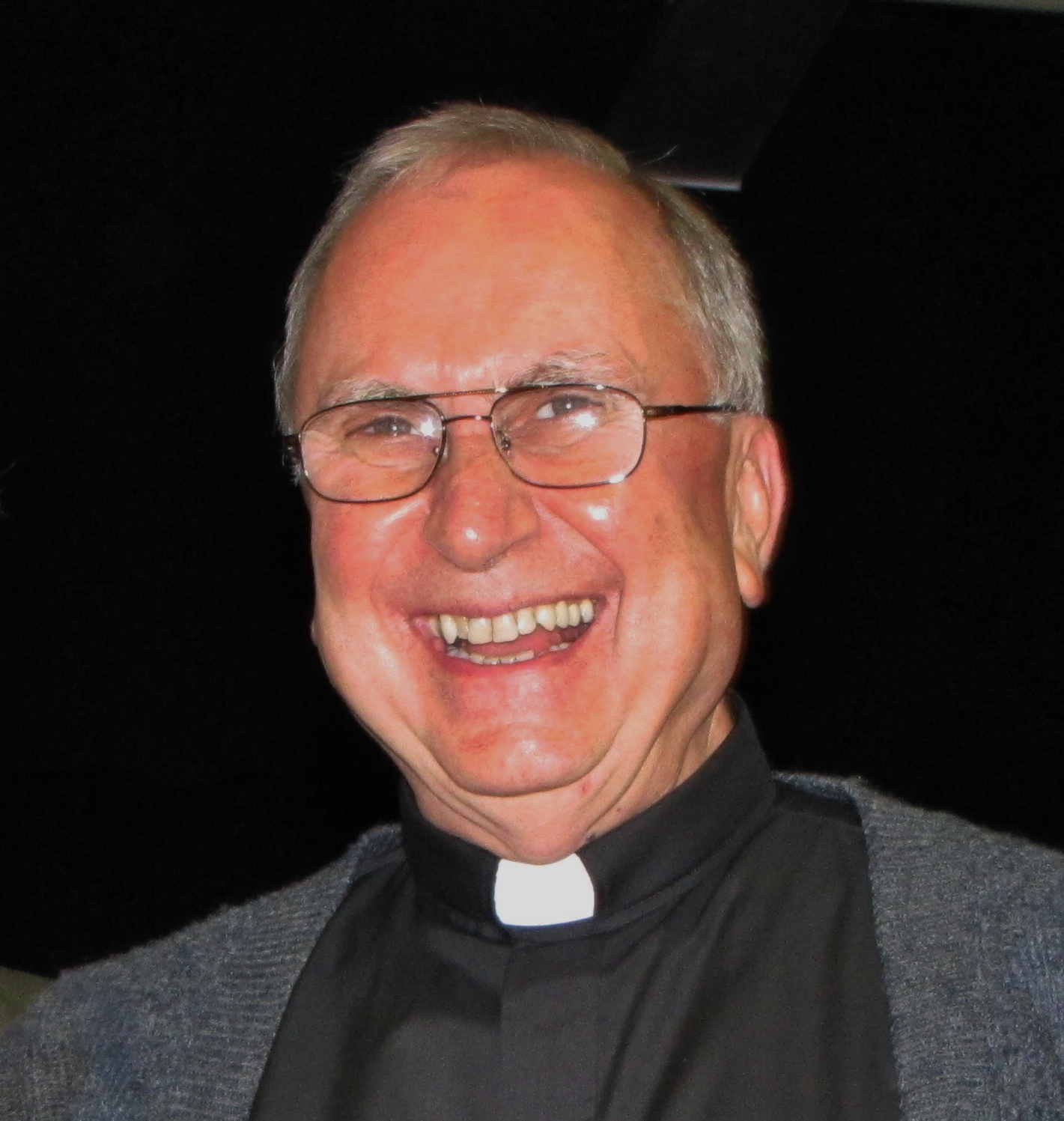
- Diocese: Stockton
- Appointed: January 18, 1999
- Installed: March 16, 1999
- Term ended: January 23, 2018
- Predecessor: Donald Montrose
- Successor: Myron Joseph Cotta
- Previous posts: Auxiliary Bishop of Los Angeles; 1990 to 1999

Orders
- Ordination: April 29, 1967 by James Francis McIntyre
- Consecration: May 31, 1990 by Roger Mahony, John Ward, and George Patrick Ziemann

Personal details
- Born: December 22, 1941 Los Angeles, California, US
- Died: June 18, 2019 (aged 77) Modesto, California, US
- Motto: ALIVE FOR GOD IN CHRIST JESUS

Styles of Stephen Edward Blaire
- Reference style: His Excellency; The Most Reverend
- Spoken style: Your Excellency
- Religious style: Bishop

Stephen Edward Blaire (December 22, 1941 – June 18, 2019) was an American Catholic prelate who served as Bishop of Stockton from 1999 to 2018.

== Biography ==
=== Early life ===
Stephen Edward Blaire was born in Los Angeles, California, as the twelfth of fourteen children. He attended local Catholic schools in the San Fernando Valley, and graduated from Our Lady Queen of Angels Seminary (high school) in 1959. Blaire then entered St. John's Seminary College in Camarillo.

=== Priesthood ===
He was ordained to the priesthood for the Archdiocese of Los Angeles by Cardinal James McIntyre on April 29, 1967, and then served as associate pastor of St. Luke's Parish in Temple City, California, until 1972.

From 1972 to 1986, Blaire worked in Catholic secondary education, initially as a teacher and administrator at Bishop Alemany High School in Mission Hills, California and later as vice principal at Bishop Amat High School in La Puente, California. He was principal at Bishop Alemany from 1977 to 1986. He then became curial moderator and chancellor of the archdiocese.

=== Auxiliary Bishop of Los Angeles ===
On February 17, 1990, Blaire was appointed auxiliary bishop of the Archdiocese of Los Angeles and titular bishop of Lamzella by Pope John Paul II. He received his episcopal consecration on May 31, 1990, from Archbishop Roger Mahony, with Bishops John Ward and George Ziemann serving as co-consecrators. Blaire was made vicar general of Los Angeles in 1990 and assigned to Our Lady of the Angels Pastoral Region in 1995.

=== Bishop of Stockton ===
Blaire was named the fifth bishop of the Diocese Stockton on January 18, 1999, and was installed on March 16, 1999, in the Cathedral of the Annunciation.

Within the United States Conference of Catholic Bishops (USCCB), Blaire was chair of the Committee on Domestic Justice and Human Development, having formerly chaired the Pastoral Practices Committee and been a member of the Committee on Ecumenical and Interreligious Affairs. Within the California Catholic Conference, he was chair of the Legislation and Public Policy Committee, as well as a member of the Religious Liberty Committee. He also served on the Ad Hoc Committee on Ecumenical affairs.

In 2001, Blaire learned of allegations that Oscar Pelaez, a priest of the diocese, had molested a 14-year-old boy at Sacred Heart Church in Turlock, California, in 1997. Blaire suspended Pelaez but did not report the incident. Blaire indicated that because the person alleging the abuse was now an adult and declined to report it, responsibility for reporting it did not rest with the diocese. Blaire said his critics "made an issue about not reporting. We had no legal obligation to report."

In November 2007, Blaire was defeated in his bid to win the chair of the USCCB Committee for the Protection of Children and Young People.

In June 2012, Blaire, as chair of the USCCB Committee on Domestic Justice and Human Development, announced organization's proposal to draft a message entitled Catholic Reflections on Work, Poverty and a Broken Economy.

In May, 2013, the University of San Francisco awarded Blaire an honorary degree and he was the commencement speaker at the graduation ceremony for the Graduate Students in the College of Arts and Sciences.

=== Retirement and legacy ===
On January 23, 2018, Pope Francis accepted Blaire's resignation as bishop of the Diocese of Stockton. Stephen Blaire died on June 18, 2019, in Modesto, California.

== Viewpoints ==
=== Capital punishment ===
Citing his opposition to capital punishment, Blaire made this statement in 2013:

"We must lift up the dignity of all human life – even for those convicted of the worst crimes, and work to transform our culture so that it respects the inherent dignity and value of all people,"

=== Social justice ===
In a 2013 letter to the US House of Representatives, Blaire said that budget cuts to human services should be evaluated on three criteria:

- .Whether it protects or threatens human life and dignity
- How it affects “the least of these” (Matthew 25):
- The needs of those who are hungry and homeless, without work or in poverty should come first.

== See also ==
- Catholic Church hierarchy
- Catholic Church in the United States
- Historical list of the Catholic bishops of the United States
- List of Catholic bishops of the United States
- Lists of patriarchs, archbishops, and bishops

== Episcopal succession ==
Catholic Church titles
Preceded by Donald Montrose	Bishop of Stockton; 1999-2018	Succeeded by Myron Joseph Cotta
