= Hanna High School =

Hanna High School may refer to:

- Hanna High School (Oklahoma) in Hanna, Oklahoma, United States
- Archbishop Hanna High School in Sonoma, California, United States
- Homer Hanna High School in Brownsville, Texas, United States
- T. L. Hanna High School in Anderson, South Carolina, United States

== See also ==
- Pardes Hanna Agricultural High School in Pardes Hanna-Karkur, Israel
