= Hugh Aloysius Donohoe =

American prelate

His Excellency, The Most Reverend Hugh Aloysius Donohoe
- Bishop of Fresno; Titular Bishop of Taium
- Church: Roman Catholic Church
- See: Diocese of Fresno
- In office: August 22, 1969 to July 1, 1980
- Predecessor: Timothy Manning
- Successor: José de Jesús Madera Uribe
- Other post: Titular Bishop of Taium

Orders
- Ordination: June 14, 1930 by Edward Joseph Hanna
- Consecration: October 7, 1947 by John Joseph Mitty

Personal details
- Born: June 28, 1905 San Francisco, California, US
- Died: October 26, 1987 (aged 82) Fresno, California, US
- Education: St. Patrick Seminary; Catholic University of America
- Motto: In omibus caritas (Love in all things)

Styles of Hugh Aloysius Donohoe
- Reference style: His Excellency; The Most Reverend
- Spoken style: Your Excellency
- Religious style: Bishop

Ordination history of Hugh Aloysius Donohoe
History
Episcopal consecration
- Consecrated by: John Joseph Mitty (San Francisco)
Episcopal succession
Bishops consecrated by Hugh Aloysius Donohoe as principal consecrator
- Thomas Patrick Collins, M.M.: March 7, 1961
- Roger Mahony: March 19, 1975
- José de Jesús Madera Uribe, M.Sp.S.: March 4, 1980

Hugh Aloysius Donohoe (June 28, 1905 – October 26, 1987) was an American prelate of the Roman Catholic Church. He served as bishop of the Diocese of Fresno in California from 1969 to 1980.

Donohoe previously served as an auxiliary bishop of the Archdiocese of San Francisco from 1947 to 1962 and as bishop of the Diocese of Stockton in California from 1962 to 1969.

== Biography ==
=== Early life ===
Born in San Francisco, California on June 28, 1905, Donohoe was educated at St. Patrick Seminary in Menlo Park, California, and at the Catholic University of America in Washington, D.C.

=== Priesthood ===
Donohoe was ordained to the priesthood on June 14, 1930 in San Francisco by Archbishop Edward Joseph Hanna. He then served as a professor at St. Patrick Seminary (1930 to 1942) and editor of The Monitor (1942 to 1947). He became known as a prominent Catholic labor activist and opponent of abortion.

=== Auxiliary Bishop of San Francisco ===
On August 2, 1947, Donohoe was appointed as an auxiliary bishop of San Francisco and titular bishop of Taium by Pope Pius XII. He received his episcopal consecration at the Cathedral of Saint Mary of the Assumption in San Francisco on October 7, 1947, from Archbishop John Mitty, with Bishops James Sweeney and Thomas Connolly serving as co-consecrators. Donohoe was appointed in 1948 as rector of the Cathedral of Saint Mary.

=== Bishop of Stockton ===
Pope John XXIII named Donohoe as the first bishop of the newly erected Diocese of Stockton on January 27, 1962. He was installed on April 24, 1962. He attended all four sessions of the Second Vatican Council in Rome between 1962 and 1965.

=== Bishop of Fresno ===
Pope Paul VI appointed Donohoe to be Bishop of Fresno on August 22, 1969.

On July 1, 1980, Pope John Paul II accepted Donohoe's resignation as bishop of Fresno. Hugh Donohoe died in Fresno, California, on October 26, 1987, at age 82.

== Episcopal succession ==
Catholic Church titles
Preceded by none	Bishop of Stockton; 1962–1969	Succeeded by Merlin Guilfoyle
Preceded by Timothy Manning	Bishop of Fresno; 1969–1980	Succeeded by José de Jesús Madera Uribe
