= Merlin Guilfoyle =

American Roman Catholic prelate

His Eminence, The Most Reverend Merlin Guilfoyle
- Bishop of Stockton; Titular Bishop of Bulla
- Church: Roman Catholic Church
- See: Diocese of Stockton
- In office: November 12, 1969 to September 4, 1979
- Predecessor: Hugh Aloysius Donohoe
- Successor: Roger Mahony
- Other posts: Auxiliary Bishop of San Francisco 1950 to 1969; Titular Bishop of Bulla

Orders
- Ordination: June 10, 1933 by Edward Joseph Hanna
- Consecration: September 21, 1950 by John Joseph Mitty

Personal details
- Born: July 15, 1908 San Francisco, US
- Died: November 20, 1981 (aged 73) Stockton, California, US
- Education: St. Patrick's Seminary; Catholic University of America

Styles of Merlin Guilfoyle
- Reference style: The Most Reverend
- Spoken style: Your Excellency
- Religious style: Monsignor

Merlin Joseph Guilfoyle (July 15, 1908 – November 20, 1981) was an American prelate of the Catholic Church. He served as bishop of the Diocese of Stockton in California from 1969 to 1979. He previously served as an auxiliary bishop of the Archdiocese of San Francisco in California from 1950 to 1969.

== Biography ==
=== Early life ===
Merlin Guilfoyle was born on July 15, 1908, in San Francisco, California, to John Joseph and Teresa (née Bassity) Guilfoyle. His parents' home was destroyed in the 1906 San Francisco earthquake. Prior to Guilfoyle's birth, they returned to San Francisco from two years living in Oakland, California.

Guilfoyle attended St. James Boys' School in San Francisco from 1914 to 1922, and St. Joseph's College in Mountain View from 1922 to 1927. He then studied (1927-1933) at St. Patrick's Seminary in Menlo Park.

=== Priesthood ===
Guilfoyle was ordained to the priesthood by Archbishop Edward Joseph Hanna in San Francisco on June 10, 1933 for the Archdiocese of San Francisco. In 1937, he earned a Doctor of Canon Law degree from the Catholic University of America in Washington, D.C. The Vatican elevated Guilfoyle to the rank of domestic prelate in 1949. He was the co-founder and chaplain of the St. Thomas More Society for the archdiocese.

=== Auxiliary Bishop of San Francisco ===
On August 24, 1950, Guilfoyle was appointed auxiliary bishop of San Francisco and titular bishop of Bulla by Pope Pius XII. He received his episcopal consecration at the Cathedral of Saint Mary of the Assumption in San Francisco on September 21, 1950, from Archbishop John Mitty, with Bishops James Sweeney and Hugh Donohoe serving as co-consecrators.

In addition to his duties as bishop, Guilfoyle served as rector of Mission San Francisco de Asís (1950-1969) and military vicar of armed forces for the Archdiocese of San Francisco and the Dioceses of Monterey-Fresno, Sacramento, Reno, and Salt Lake City. On October 3, 1955, Guilfoyle dedicated a statue of Francis of Assisi by artist Beniamino Bufano at St. Francis of Assisi Church in San Francisco.

=== Bishop of Stockton ===
Guilfoyle was named the second bishop of Stockton by Pope Paul VI on November 12, 1969. He was installed in Stockton, California, on January 13, 1970.

=== Retirement and legacy ===
On September 4, 1979, Pope John Paul II accepted Guilfoyle's resignation as bishop of Stockton. Merlin Guilfoyle died in Stockton, California, on November 20, 1981, at age 73.

On July 17, 1998, a jury awarded two brothers $40 million in a sexual abuse lawsuit against the Diocese of Stockton. Joh and James Howard said they were molested as altar boys by Reverend Oliver Francis O’Grady, a priest at St. Ann's Parish in Lodi, California, starting in the 1970's. O'Grady had received 14 years in prison for molesting the boys. In 1976, O'Grady had admitted to Guilfoyle directly that he had inappropriately touched Nancy Sloan-Ferguson, then an 11 year old girl. In response, Guilfoyle transferred him to another parish and sent him to counseling - he did not suspend his privileges or notify police. The lawsuit accused the diocese of negligence.

== See also ==
Catholic Church titles
Preceded by Hugh Aloysius Donohoe	Bishop of Stockton; 1969–1979	Succeeded by Roger Mahony
