= Diocese of Fresno =

Latin Catholic jurisdiction in the US

Coordinates: 36.7478°N 119.7720°W

Diocese of Fresno Dioecesis Fresnensis
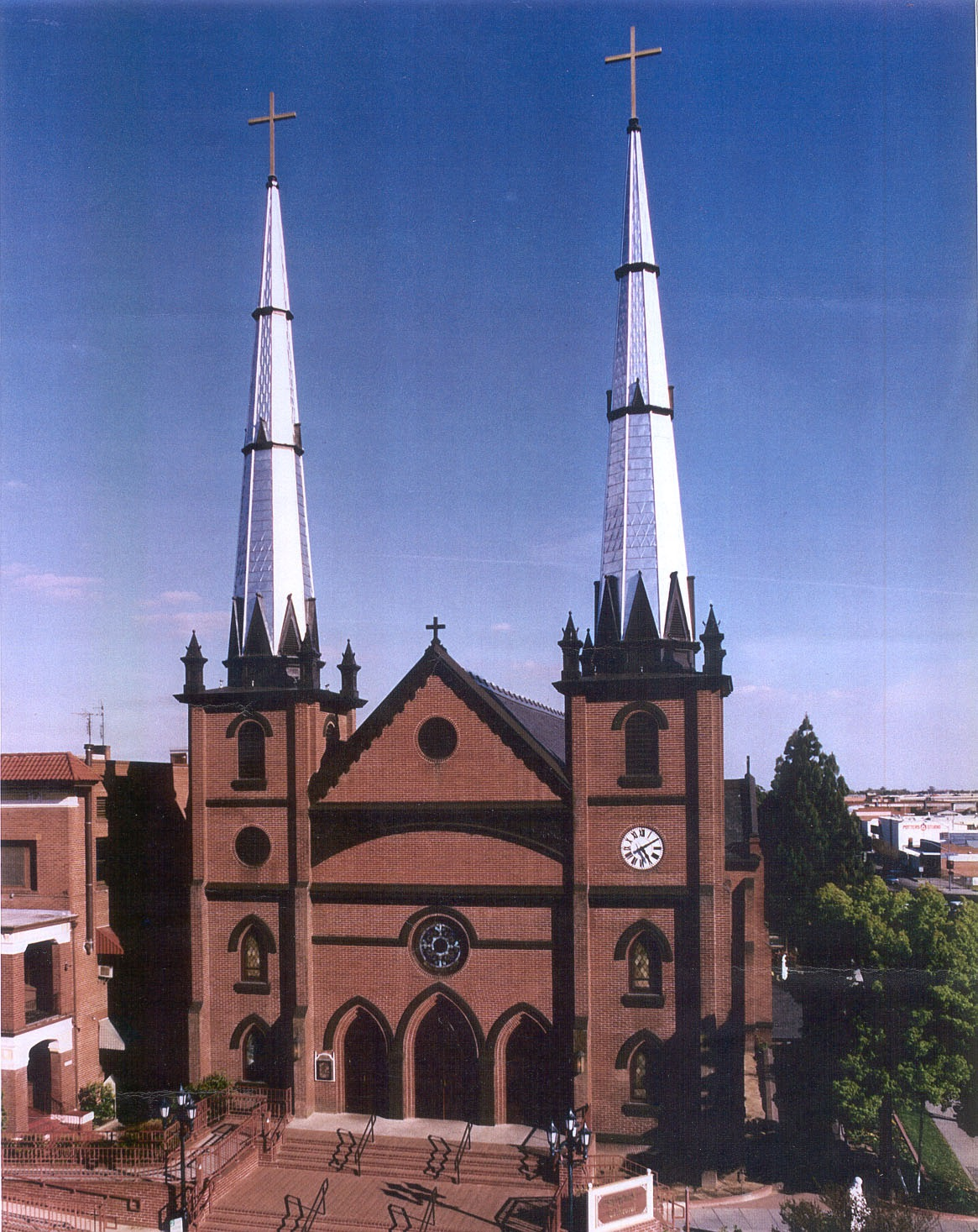
- St. John's Cathedral

- Coat of arms

Location
- Country: United States
- Territory: Counties of Fresno, Inyo, Kern, Kings, Madera, Merced, Mariposa, and Tulare
- Ecclesiastical province: Los Angeles

Statistics
- Population: Total; Catholics: (as of 2023); 3,014,103; 1,244,400 (41.3%)
- Parishes: 87
- Congregations: 41
- Schools: 38 (Pre-School, Elementary, Middle, and High School)

Information
- Denomination: Catholic
- Sui iuris church: Latin Church
- Rite: Roman Rite
- Established: October 6, 1967
- Cathedral: Saint John the Baptist Cathedral
- Patron saint: St. Therese of Lisieux (Primary), St. Columba (Secondary)
- Secular priests: 179 (Diocesan and Religious)

Current leadership
- Pope: Leo XIV
- Bishop: Joseph Vincent Brennan
- Metropolitan Archbishop: José Gómez
- Vicar General: Salvador Gonzalez
- Bishops emeritus: Armando Xavier Ochoa

Map
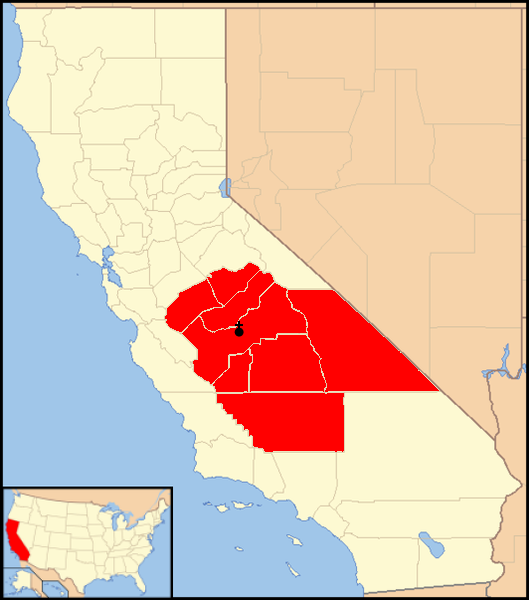

Website
- dioceseoffresno.org

The Diocese of Fresno (Latin: Dioecesis Fresnensis) is a diocese of the Latin Church in the Central Valley of California in the United States. It is a suffragan diocese of the Archdiocese of Los Angeles. The bishop is Joseph Brennan. Since 1922, the diocesan see has been in the City of Fresno with the cathedra at St. John's Cathedral.

== Statistics ==
The Diocese of Fresno consists of 35,239 square miles (91,270 km^{2}) of the southern San Joaquin Valley of California, a portion of the Sierra Nevada Mountains and some valleys in eastern California. The diocese contains Fresno, Inyo, Kern, Kings, Madera, Mariposa, Merced, and Tulare counties. For administrative purposes, the diocese is subdivided into five deaneries: Fresno City, Fresno (rural), Tulare/Kings, Kern/Inyo, and Merced/Mariposa.

As of 2023, the total population of the diocese was 3,014,103 inhabitants, of whom 1,244,400 were registered Catholics. The diocese maintains 87 parishes, several charities, two high schools, numerous elementary schools, a small newspaper, a retreat center, and several cemeteries.

== History ==
=== 1770 to 1848 ===
During the 18th century, the Fresno area was part of the province of Las Californias in the Spanish colony of New Spain. In 1804, the Spanish Government split Las Californias into two provinces, with most of present-day California becoming part of the new province of Alta California.

Alta California became a Mexican state after Mexico gained independence from Spain in 1821. In 1840, Pope Gregory XVI erected the Diocese of California (or Two Californias) to recognize the growth of the provinces of Alta California and Baja California. This diocese, with its episcopal see in Monterey, included all Mexican territory west of the Colorado River and the Gulf of California

=== 1848 to 1967 ===
Mexico ceded Alta California to the United States in 1848 after the Mexican–American War. At that time, the Mexican government complained to the Vatican about the Diocese of California. They didn't want the American bishop to have jurisdiction over parishes in Mexico. In 1849, Pope Pius IX split the Diocese of California into American and Mexican dioceses; the American diocese was named the Diocese of Monterey. The first Catholic church in Mariposa, St. Joseph's, was dedicated in 1857.

In 1859, Pius IX renamed the Diocese of Monterey as the Diocese of Monterey-Los Angeles to recognize the growth of Los Angeles. St. Mary's Parish was founded in Visalia in 1861; it is the oldest parish in the Southern part of the Central Valley.In 1867, Our Lady of Mercy Church was dedicated in Merced. St. John's Parish was established in Fresno in 1882; its church would later become a cathedral.In Bakersfield, St. Francis was erected a parish in 1884, the first in that city.Four member of the Sisters of Mercy in 1910 expanded a small hospital in Bakersfield to start Mercy Hospital; it is today Mercy Hospital Downtown.

In 1922, Pope Pius XI divided the Diocese of Monterey-Los Angeles, with the northern section becoming the Diocese of Monterey-Fresno. The Fresno area would remain part of this diocese for the next 45 years. The Sisters of the Holy Cross opened St. Agnes Hospital in Fresno in 1929; it is today Saint Agnes Medical Center.The Sisters of Nazareth in 1951 opened Nazareth House of Fresno, a residence for the elderly.

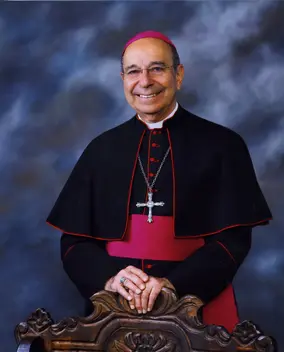
Bishop Ochoa (2023)

=== 1967 to 2000 ===
Pope Paul VI created the new Diocese of Fresno in 1967 by splitting the Diocese of Monterey-Fresno into two dioceses. He named Auxiliary Bishop Timothy Manning of the Archdiocese of Los Angeles as the first bishop of Fresno. The estimated Catholic population of the new diocese was 307,000.

During his tenure as bishop, Manning supported the organization of a labor union for Central Valley farm workers, and sought to help wine producers and grape pickers reconcile their differences. After two years in Fresno, Paul VI named Manning archbishop of Los Angeles. To replace him, the pope appointed Bishop Hugh Donohoe from the Diocese of Stockton. In 1979, Pope John Paul II appointed José de Jesús Madera Uribe of Los Angeles as coadjutor bishop of Fresno to assist Donohoe.

After Donohoe resigned in 1980, Madera Uribe became bishop of Fresno. In 1991, he was made auxiliary bishop of the Amer Archdiocese for the Military Services. The next bishop of Fresno was bishop John Steinbock from the Diocese of Santa Rosa, appointed in 1991.

=== 2000 to present ===
In 2003, the Diocese of Fresno was one of only four dioceses in the United States that did not participate in the United States Conference of Catholic Bishops review of the Charter for the Protection of Children and Young People. Steinbock died in 2010. In 2011, Bishop Armando Xavier Ochoa of the Diocese of El Paso became the next bishop of Fresno.

Ochoa retired as bishop of Fresno in 2019. Auxiliary Bishop Joseph Vincent Brennan of Los Angeles was appointed bishop of Fresno in 2019. In February 2019, Bishop Ochoa announced an outside investigation of the diocese for all allegations of sexual abuse against clerics since 1922, with a report to be issued to the public after the investigation had concluded. In 2021, the diocese released a list of priests who had been "credibly accused" of abuse.

The diocese in November 2020 removed the priest Guadalupe Rios from St. Joseph's Church in Selma and obtained a restraining order barring him from the church and its employees. While serving the order on Rios, the Selma police seized an assault rifle and a handgun, both of which belong to him, from church property.

Brennan in 2022 briefly joined a march held by the United Farm Workers from Delano to Sacramento in support of a union voting rights bill. St. Charles Borromeo Church in Visalia opened in 2023, becoming the largest Catholic parish church in North America.

In May 2024, the diocese announced that they were preparing to file for Chapter 11 bankruptcy by August 2024, claiming that it was now facing over 150 sex abuse lawsuits from victims. In July 2025, the diocese filed for Chapter 11 bankruptcy as it tried to overcome and settle many of its 153 sex abuse lawsuits.

== Bishops ==
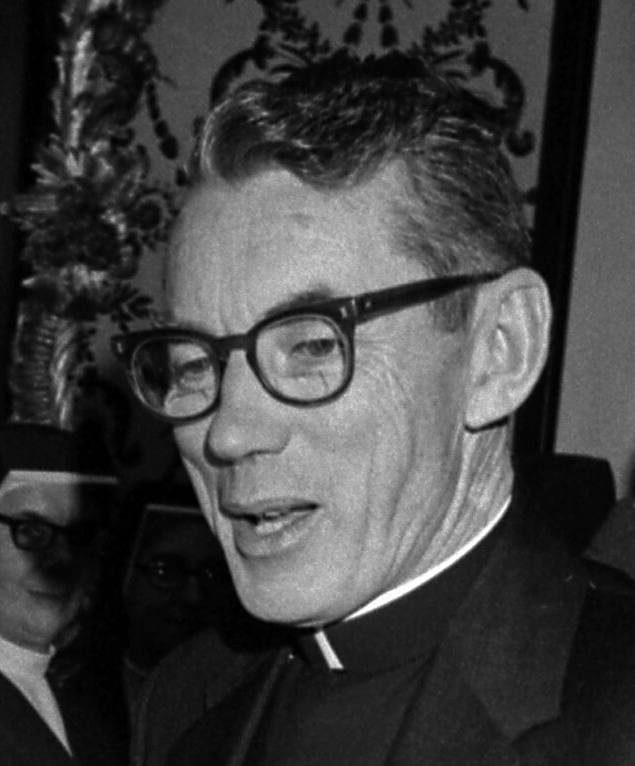
Bishop Manning (1973)

=== Bishops of Monterey-Fresno ===
1. John Bernard MacGinley (1924-1932)
2. Philip George Scher (1933-1953)
3. Aloysius Joseph Willinger (1953-1967)

=== Bishops of Fresno ===
1. Timothy Manning (1967-1969), appointed Coadjutor Archbishop and later Archbishop of Los Angeles (elevated to Cardinal in 1973)
2. Hugh Aloysius Donohoe (1969-1980)
3. José de Jesús Madera Uribe (1980-1991, coadjutor bishop 1979–1980), appointed Auxiliary Bishop for the Military Services, USA
4. John Thomas Steinbock (1991-2010)
5. Armando Xavier Ochoa (2011-2019)
6. Joseph Vincent Brennan (2019–present)

=== Auxiliary bishop ===
Roger Mahony (1975-1980), appointed Bishop of Stockton and later Archbishop of Los Angeles (created a Cardinal in 1991)

=== Other diocesan priest who became a bishop ===
Myron Joseph Cotta, appointed Auxiliary Bishop of Sacramento in 2014, appointed Bishop of Stockton in 2018

== Schools ==
- Garces Memorial High School- Bakersfield. Established 1947
- San Joaquin Memorial High School-Fresno. Established 1945
