= Cathedral of the Annunciation (Stockton, California) =

- Cathedral of the Annunciation
- 37°57′47″N 121°17′59″W
- Location: 400 W. Rose St . Stockton, California
- Country: United States
- Language(s): English, Spanish
- Denomination: Roman Catholic

History
- Status: Cathedral
- Founded: 1942

Architecture
- Architect: Henry A. Minton
- Architectural type: Modified Gothic
- Style: Gothic Revival
- Completed: December 12, 1942
- Construction cost: $285,000

Specifications
- Capacity: 750
- Materials: Brick

Administration
- Diocese: Diocese of Stockton

Clergy
- Bishop: Most Rev. Myron Joseph Cotta
- Pastor: Fr. Cesar Martinez

The Cathedral of the Annunciation is a Catholic cathedral in Stockton, California, United States. It is the seat of the Diocese of Stockton.

== History ==
Archbishop John J. Mitty of San Francisco approved the building of a new parish in the north side of Stockton in 1941. As the population of the city was growing to the north, the decision was made to build a "new" St. Mary's, and then eventually tear down the "old" St. Mary's downtown that had been built in 1893 and was in bad need of repair. Monsignor William E. McGough was the first pastor of the "new" St. Mary's. He worked with San Francisco architect Henry A. Minton and Stockton contractors Shepherd and Green to construct the modified-Gothic church. The building permit for the church was issued on March 5, 1941, for a building that would cost $175,000 and take approximately one year to build. As the Second World War began, the pace of building slowed but did not stop. The building had been fully paid for before construction was finished and the total cost was $285,000. The church was dedicated on December 12, 1942.

The church is constructed of reinforced concrete, then faced with brick and ornamented with cast stone. The overall treatment is Gothic. A ninety-two-foot belfry tower is located in the northeast corner. Limestone steps lead to the entrance, which has a vaulted ceiling and terrazzo floor.

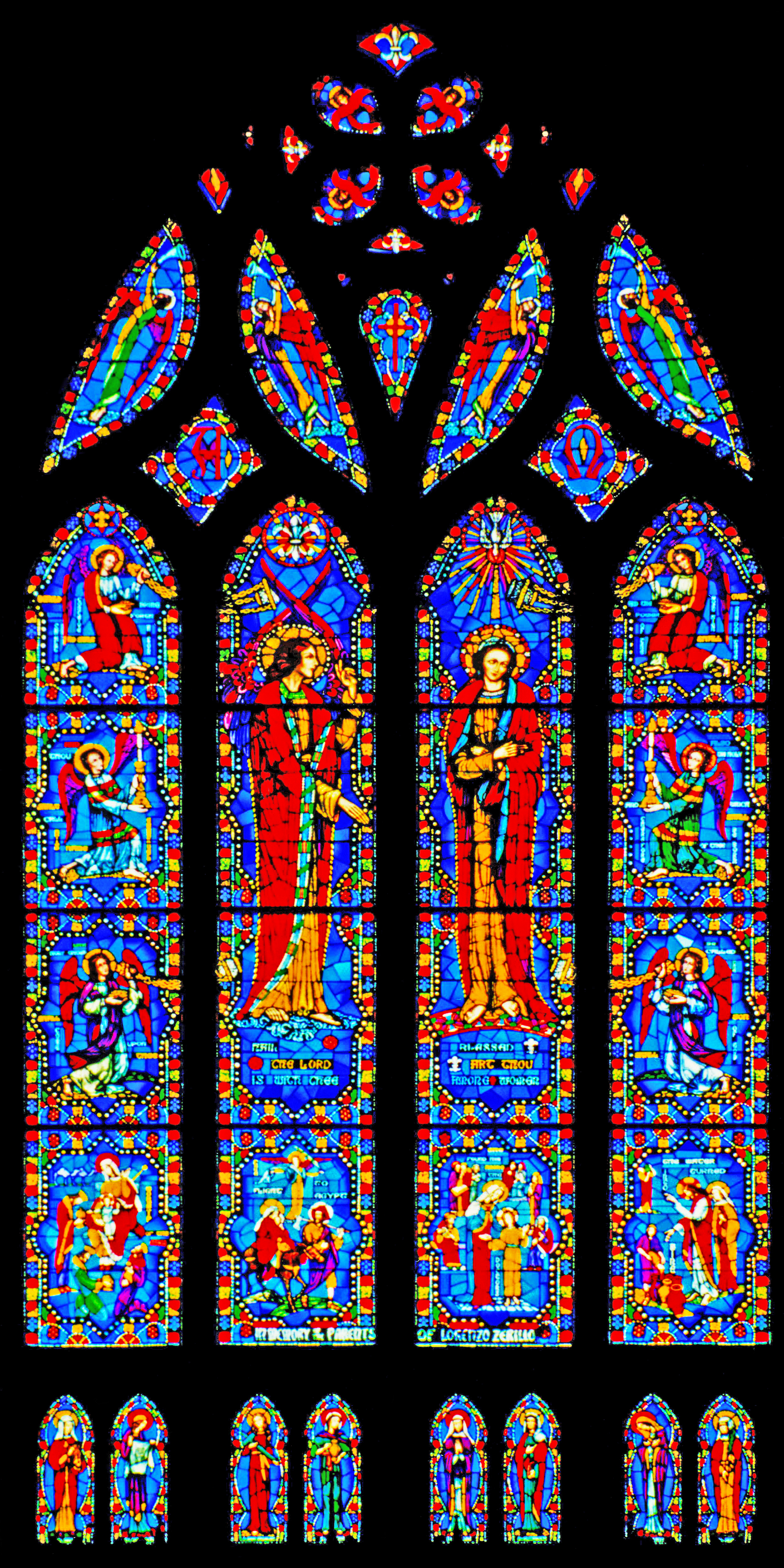
Annunciation stained glass

== The Cathedral's stained glass windows ==
The Cathedral of the Anunciation has many diverse designs of stained glass windows, The very first stained glass window was "The Prophets of the Old Testament" which were placed on the wall of the choir by the organ.

The "Church Art Glass San Francisco" created the St. Peter and St. Paul window and the other windows like "The Annunciation" were made by Carl Huneke. Msgr. McGough selected the theme of the windows from the cathedral along with Sister Peter and Sister Maurice accompanying him for inspection of the construction of the stained glass over the years. The stained glass were restored by Frand Warthemenn in 1997 and have been the same way since then.

== See also ==
- List of Catholic cathedrals in the United States
- List of cathedrals in the United States
