= John Joseph Mitty =

American prelate of the Roman Catholic Church

His Excellency, The Most Reverend John Joseph Mitty
- Archbishop of San Francisco; Titular Archbishop of Aegina
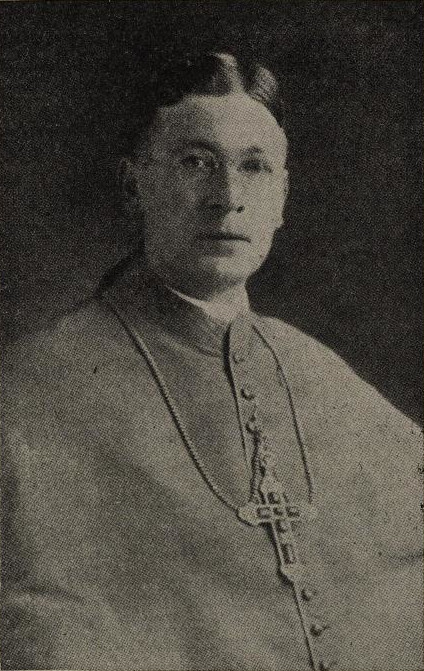
- Mitty in 1926 at the time of his installation as Bishop of Salt Lake
- See: Archdiocese of San Francisco
- Installed: March 2, 1935
- Term ended: October 15, 1961
- Predecessor: Edward Joseph Hanna
- Successor: Joseph Thomas McGucken
- Previous posts: Bishop of Salt Lake (1926–1932); Coadjutor Archbishop of San Francisco (1932–1935)

Orders
- Ordination: December 22, 1906 by John Murphy Farley
- Consecration: September 8, 1926 by Patrick Joseph Hayes, John Joseph Dunn and Daniel Joseph Curley

Personal details
- Born: January 20, 1884 New York, New York, US
- Died: October 15, 1961 (aged 77) Menlo Park, California, US
- Denomination: Roman Catholic Church
- Motto: Mihi vivere Christus est (For me to live is Christ)

Ordination history of John Joseph Mitty
History
Episcopal consecration
- Consecrated by: Patrick Joseph Hayes (New York)
- Date: September 8, 1926
Episcopal succession
Bishops consecrated by John Joseph Mitty as principal consecrator
- Duane Garrison Hunt: October 28, 1937
- Thomas Arthur Connolly: August 24, 1939
- James Joseph Sweeney: July 25, 1941
- Hugh Aloysius Donohoe: October 7, 1947
- James Thomas O'Dowd: June 29, 1948
- Merlin Joseph Guilfoyle: September 21, 1950
- Robert Joseph Dwyer: August 5, 1952
- John Joseph Scanlan: September 21, 1954

Styles of John Joseph Mitty
- Reference style: His Excellency; The Most Reverend
- Spoken style: Your Excellency
- Religious style: Archbishop

John Joseph Mitty (January 20, 1884 – October 15, 1961) was an American prelate of the Roman Catholic Church. He served as the third bishop of Salt Lake in Utah (1926–1932) and the fourth archbishop of San Francisco in California (1935–1961).

== Early life and education ==
John Mitty was born on January 20, 1884, in the Greenwich Village section of New York City, the son of John and Mary (née Murphy) Mitty. He received his early education at the parochial school of St. Joseph's Parish in New York. In 1896, he enrolled at De La Salle Institute in New York City. He was orphaned at age fourteen.

Mitty attended Manhattan College in New York City, where he earned a Bachelor of Arts degree in 1901. He then began his studies for the priesthood at St. Joseph's Seminary in Yonkers, New York.

== Priesthood ==
On December 22, 1906, Mitty was ordained a priest at St. Joseph's for the Archdiocese of New York by Archbishop John Farley. He continued his studies at the Catholic University of America in Washington, D.C., where he earned a Bachelor of Sacred Theology degree in 1907. The following year he received a doctorate in theology from the Major Pontifical Seminary in Rome.

Following his return to New York City in 1909, the archdiocese briefly assigned Mitty as a curate at St. Veronica Parish in the West Village of Manhattan. From 1909 to 1917, he was a professor of dogmatic theology at St. Joseph's Seminary. One of Mitty's students at St. Joseph's was future Cardinal James McIntyre. After the entry of the United States into World War I in 1917, Mitty served as a chaplain in the U.S. Army, serving with the American Expeditionary Forces, 49th Infantry Division, and 101st Airborne Division in France. He was attached to two New York regiments that participated in the 1918 Meuse-Argonne Offensive in France.

After the end of the war, Mitty was discharged from military service in 1919. The archdiocese then assigned him as pastor of Sacred Heart Parish in Highland Falls, New York. In addition to his pastoral duties, he served as a Catholic chaplain at the United States Military Academy at West Point from 1919 to 1922. In 1922, Archbishop Patrick Hayes named Mitty pastor of St. Luke Parish in the Bronx.

=== Bishop of Salt Lake ===
On June 21, 1926, Mitty was appointed the third bishop of Salt Lake by Pope Pius XI. He received his episcopal consecration on September 6, 1926. from Cardinal Patrick Hayes, with Bishops John Dunn and Daniel Curley serving as co-consecrators, at St. Patrick's Cathedral in New York City.

Mitty inherited a diocese deeply in debt. His predecessor had resorted to taking out new loans to pay the interest on previous debt, and left the diocese owing over $300,000. Mitty took control of the finances, focusing on improving the weekly offertory collection. When he left in 1932, the diocese was beginning to pay off its debts, and his successor was able to finish paying them off in 1936.

=== Coadjutor Archbishop and Archbishop of San Francisco ===
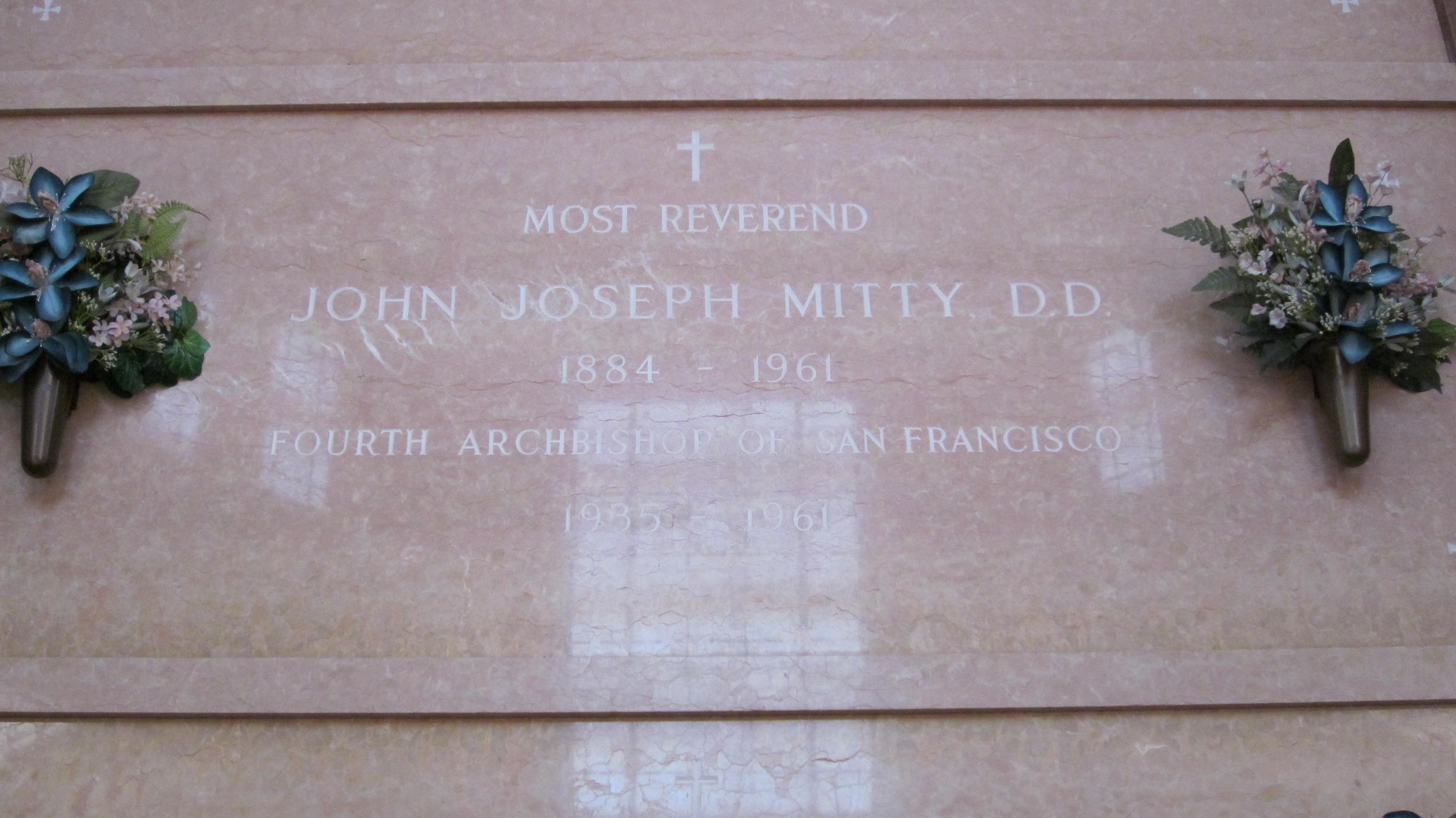
Archbishop Mitty's vault at Holy Cross Cemetery (2010)

On January 29, 1932 Pius XI appointed Mitty as titular archbishop of Aegina and coadjutor archbishop of San Francisco to assist Archbishop Edward Hanna. When Hanna retired on March 2, 1935, Mitty automatically succeeded as archbishop. He was installed as archbishop and presented the pallium, the symbol of a metropolitan bishop, at a pontifical high mass at the Cathedral of Saint Mary of the Assumption in San Francisco in September 1935. During his time as archbishop, Mitty resided at the Archbishop's Mansion in San Francisco.

Mitty worked to rebuild or establish Catholic institutions in the archdiocese. His first act as archbishop was to direct his installation gift from the clergy to restoring Saint Patrick Seminary in Menlo Park, California. He repurchased the foreclosed St. Mary's College of California in Moraga in 1937, and reopened the college in 1938. In the 26 years of his episcopate, 84 parishes and missions were founded in the archdiocese, and over 500 building projects were completed.

Mitty briefly made headlines by calling for a boycott of the San Francisco News for reporting that a priest had pleaded guilty for drunk driving, calling the coverage anti-Catholic. He joined with several other American prelates and criticizing the 1945 Moscow Declarations, doubting that the Soviet Union would keep its promises.

In 1951, Mitty approved the establishment of the Western Association of the Sovereign Military Order of Malta in San Francisco for the Western United States. He presided at the first investiture ceremony of the association in 1953.

=== Death and legacy ===
John Mitty died of a heart attack at Saint Patrick's Seminary in Menlo Park on October 15, 1961. He is buried in the Archbishops' Crypt at Holy Cross Cemetery in Colma, California. Archbishop Mitty High School in San Jose, California, is named for him.

Catholic Church titles
Preceded by Joseph Sarsfield Glass, C.M.	Bishop of Salt Lake; 1926–1932	Succeeded by James Edward Kearney
Preceded by Edward Joseph Hanna	Archbishop of San Francisco; 1935–1961	Succeeded by Joseph Thomas McGucken
