= Timothy Manning =

Irish American prelate

His Eminence Timothy Finbar Manning
- Cardinal, Archbishop of Los Angeles; Titular Bishop of Lesvi; Titular Archbishop of Capreae
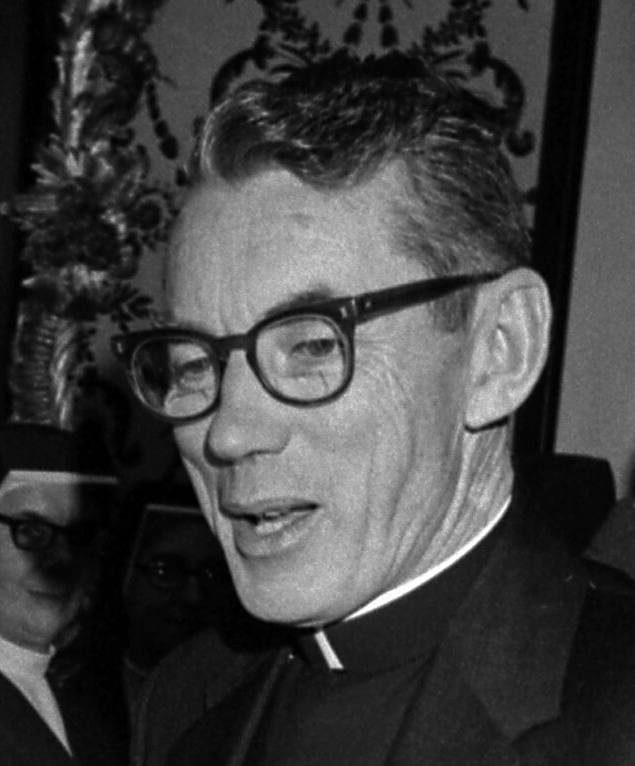
- Manning in 1973
- See: Los Angeles
- Appointed: May 26, 1969 (Coadjutor)
- Installed: January 21, 1970
- Term ended: June 4, 1985
- Predecessor: James Francis McIntyre
- Successor: Roger Mahony
- Other posts: Cardinal Priest of S. Lucia a Piazza d'Armi
- Previous post: Coadjutor Archbishop of Los Angeles (1969–1970) Bishop of Fresno (1967–1969) Auxiliary Bishop of Los Angeles (1946–1967)

Orders
- Ordination: June 16, 1934 by John Joseph Cantwell
- Consecration: October 15, 1946 by Joseph Thomas McGucken
- Created cardinal: March 5, 1973 by Paul VI

Personal details
- Born: November 15, 1909 Ballingeary, Ireland
- Died: June 23, 1989 (aged 79) Los Angeles, California, US
- Buried: Calvary Cemetery, Los Angeles, California
- Education: Pontifical Gregorian University
- Motto: Magnificat (My soul magnifies the Lord)

Ordination history of Timothy Manning
History
Episcopal consecration
- Consecrated by: Joseph Thomas McGucken
- Date: October 15, 1946
Episcopal succession
Bishops consecrated by Timothy Manning as principal consecrator
- Juan Alfredo Arzube: May 25, 1971
- William Robert Johnson: May 25, 1971
- Manuel Duran Moreno: February 19, 1977
- Thaddeus Anthony Shubsda: February 19, 1977
- Phillip Francis Straling: November 6, 1978
- Donald William Montrose: May 12, 1983
- William Levada: May 12, 1983
- John Thomas Steinbock: July 14, 1984

Styles of Timothy Finbar Manning
- Reference style: His Eminence
- Spoken style: Your Eminence
- Religious style: Cardinal
- Informal style: Cardinal
- See: Los Angeles

Timothy Finbar Manning (Irish: Tadhg Ó Mongáin; November 15, 1909 – June 23, 1989) was an Irish-born Catholic prelate who served as Archbishop of Los Angeles from 1970 to 1985. He was elevated to the cardinalate in 1973. Manning previously served as Coadjutor Archbishop of Los Angeles from 1969 to 1970, as Bishop of Fresno from 1967 to 1969 and as an Auxiliary Bishop of Los Angeles from 1946 to 1967.

== Early life ==
Timothy Manning was born on November 15, 1909, in Ballingeary, Ireland, to Cornelius and Margaret (née Cronin) Manning. While attending Mungret College in Limerick, he was recruited to finish his seminary studies in the United States. He entered St. Patrick Seminary in Menlo Park, California, in 1928.

== Priesthood ==
Manning was ordained into the priesthood for the Diocese of Los Angeles-San Diego at the Cathedral of Saint Vibiana in Los Angeles on June 16, 1934, by Bishop John Joseph Cantwell, The diocese then sent Manning to Rome to further his studies at the Pontifical Gregorian University, obtaining a Doctor of Canon Law in 1938.

Upon his return to California in 1938, the diocese, which was now known as the Archdiocese of Los Angeles, assigned him to pastoral work in parishes. Cantwell named Manning as his personal secretary that same year. The Vatican elevated Manning to the rank of privy chamberlain in 1943 and domestic prelate in 1945. He became chancellor for the archdiocese in 1946.

== Episcopal career ==
=== Auxiliary Bishop of Los Angeles ===
On August 3, 1946, Manning was appointed auxiliary bishop of Los Angeles and titular bishop of Lesvi by Pope Pius XII. He received his episcopal consecration on October 15, 1946, from Bishop Joseph Thomas McGucken, with Bishops James Edward Walsh and Thomas Arthur Connolly serving as co-consecrators. Manning was appointed vicar general of the archdiocese in 1955. He attended the Second Vatican Council in Rome from 1962 to 1965.

=== Bishop of Fresno ===
Manning was named the first bishop of Fresno on October 16, 1967, by Pope Paul IV. During his tenure, he supported the organization of a labor union for farm workers in the Central Valley of California. He sought to reconcile differences between the wine producers and grape pickers.

=== Coadjutor Archbishop and Archbishop of Los Angeles ===
Manning was named coadjutor archbishop of Los Angeles and titular archbishop of Capreae on May 26, 1969, by Paul VI to assist Archbishop James Francis McIntyre. He succeeded McIntyre as the third archbishop of Los Angeles on January 21, 1970.

While a strong proponent of ecclesiastical authority, Manning took a more gentle style than his predecessor. The end of McIntyre's tenure had seen increased tensions between himself and the clergy and minority members. Following his installation, Manning stated, "My first reaction was to make it known that I was here to listen."

Manning instituted ministries for black and Hispanic people, a presbyterial council to grant the clergy greater participation in the governance of the archdiocese, and an interparochial council to extend the same participation to the laity. Shortly after Manning became archbishop, a majority of the Sisters of the Immaculate Heart of Mary, who had feuded with McIntyre, left the religious life and founded a lay community. In 1973, Manning supported the merger of all-male Loyola University and all-female Marymount College, creating Loyola Marymount University; McIntyre had resisted attempts to allow co-education in these institutions.

Paul VI created Manning as cardinal-priest of the Church of S. Lucia a Piazza d'Armi in Rome during the consistory of March 5, 1973.

Manning participated in the conclaves of August and October 1978 that selected Popes John Paul I and John Paul II respectively. Before entering the August conclave, Manning noted that the Catholic Church "has no political support in many places". He called to the selection of a pope who could "change people through warmth." In 1981, John Paul II sent Manning as a special papal envoy to the celebration in Drogheda, Ireland of the third centennial of the martyrdom of Oliver Plunkett, an Irish saint.

== Later life and death ==
After fifteen years in Los Angeles, Manning retired as archbishop of Los Angeles on June 4, 1985. He then took up residence at Holy Family Parish in South Pasadena.

Manning died on June 23, 1989, at the Norris Cancer Hospital of the University of Southern California, aged 79. He is buried at Calvary Cemetery in East Los Angeles.

== Viewpoints ==
=== Abortion ===
Staunchly anti-abortion, Manning declared that any Catholic who cooperated in an abortion would suffer excommunication from the Church, including the mother herself. In 1974, in response to the Supreme Court's ruling on Roe v. Wade, he testified before the Subcommittee on Constitutional Amendments of the Senate Judiciary Committee, saying,

"An amendment is necessary first of all to protect the lives of the unborn children who can be killed—indeed, are being killed at this very moment—in the wake of the Supreme Court's decisions. But it is also needed to restore integrity to the law itself, to make the American legal system once more the guarantor and protector of all human rights and the human rights of all."

=== Refugees ===
Manning called for a halt to the deportation of Salvadoran civil war refugees by the Reagan Administration in 1983.

=== War ===
During American involvement in the Vietnam War, Manning counseled young men facing the draft on their right to become conscientious objectors.

Catholic Church titles
Preceded by erected	Bishop of Fresno; 1967–1970	Succeeded by Hugh Aloysius Donohoe
Preceded by James Francis McIntyre	Archbishop of Los Angeles; 1970–1985	Succeeded by Roger Mahony
