= Donald Montrose =

Catholic bishop

His Eminence, The Most Reverend Donald William Montrose
- Bishop of Stockton titular bishop of Forum Novum
- Church: Roman Catholic Church
- See: Diocese of Stockton
- Other posts: Auxiliary Bishop of Los Angeles; 1983 to 1986

Orders
- Ordination: May 7, 1948 by James McIntyre
- Consecration: May 12, 1983 by Timothy Manning

Personal details
- Born: May 13, 1923 Denver, Colorado, US
- Died: May 7, 2008 (aged 84)

Donald William Montrose (May 13, 1923 – May 7, 2008) was an American prelate of the Roman Catholic Church. He served as bishop of the Diocese of Stockton in California from 1986 to 1999. He previously served as an auxiliary bishop of the Archdiocese of Los Angeles from 1983 to 1986.

== Biography ==
Montrose was born on May 13, 1923, in Denver, Colorado. When he was eleven, his family moved to Southern California.

Montrose was ordained by Cardinal James McIntyre as a priest for the Archdiocese of Los Angeles on May 7, 1949. He served as head of St. John's Seminary in Camarillo, California.

=== Auxiliary Bishop of Los Angeles ===
Montrose was appointed on March 25, 1983, by Pope John Paul II as an auxiliary bishop in the Archdiocese of Los Angeles and as titular bishop of Forum Novum. Montrose was consecrated by Cardinal Timothy Manning on May 12, 1983.

=== Bishop of Stockton ===
John Paul II appointed Montrose as bishop of the Diocese of Stockton on December 17, 1985; he was installed on February 20, 1986.

Montrose focused on getting Spanish-speaking priests in the diocese. He went to Mexico, Colombia and other Latin American countries and met with various bishops to try to get them to send him fluent Spanish speaking priests. In 1988, Montrose succeeded in getting the Sisters of the Cross to relocate to the diocese from Mexico. They located in Modesto, California, the second largest city in the diocese.

In 1998, a jury awarded $30 million to Joh and John Howard, two brothers from Lodi, California, who were sexually molested as children during the 1970s and 80s by a parish priest. While disappointed at the size of the verdict, Montrose apologized to the Howard family "...for this horrible evil that was inflicted on them. We do not understand the depth of the problem."

John Paul II accepted Montrose's resignation as bishop of Stockton on January 18, 1999. Donald Montrose died on May 7, 2008.

Catholic Church titles
Preceded by Roger Mahony	Bishop of Stockton; 1986–1999	Succeeded by Stephen Blaire
