= Oliver O'Grady =

Irish Catholic priest and child rapist

- Born: Oliver Francis O'Grady; 5 June 1945 (age 81); Limerick, Ireland
- Education: St Patrick's College, Thurles
- Occupation: Catholic priest (laicized)
- Years active: 1971–1993
- Criminal charges: Lewd and lascivious acts (1993); Possession of child pornography (2012); Possession of child pornography (2020)
- Criminal penalty: 14 years in prison (served 7); 3 years in prison 22 months

Ecclesiastical career
- Church: Roman Catholic Church
- Ordained: 1971
- Laicized: Yes

Oliver Francis O'Grady (born 5 June 1945) is an Irish laicized Catholic priest who sexually abused at least 25 children in California from 1973 onwards. His abuse and Cardinal Roger Mahony's attempts to hide the crimes are the subject of Amy J. Berg's documentary film Deliver Us from Evil in 2006.

== Early life and education ==
O'Grady was born in Limerick on 5 June 1945. He confided in one of his victims that his father died when he was six, after which his mother struggled to raise him and his six siblings alone. O'Grady testified that he was molested as a child by two priests in the sacristy of his church, the first instance occurring when he was 10 years old and an altar boy. The second instance happened when he was a teenager. O'Grady also claimed to have been involved in sexual abuse within his family, both as a perpetrator and a victim. He testified that growing up, he considered it "a very normal thing" that was not spoken about.

After completing secondary school in Limerick, in 1964 O'Grady enrolled as a seminarian at St Patrick's College in Thurles. His studies for the priesthood were sponsored by the Diocese of Stockton, California, in the United States. He was ordained in 1971 and moved to California to begin his ministry in the Diocese of Stockton. O'Grady testified that his sexual attraction to children began before his ordination.

== Priesthood and sexual abuse ==
=== St. Anne's Church, Lodi ===
O'Grady's first priestly assignment was St. Anne's Church in Lodi, a city in California's Central Valley, which had a parish school with 300 students. There, he served as an associate pastor, and his responsibilities included serving at the parish's several missions, including St. Joachim's in Lockeford and Mater Ecclesiae in Thornton. O'Grady was described as well-liked but distant by Cornelius DeGroot, the pastor of St. Anne's in 1975–1977. During this time, O'Grady began molesting a five-year-old girl at her family home, where he was an occasional overnight guest.

In 1976, O'Grady befriended the parents of 11-year-old Nancy Sloan, who he had met while helping manage a church summer camp. With her parents' permission, he took Nancy to stay with him at the church rectory over a long weekend. During this visit, O'Gracy testified, he molested Nancy in her bed and in a pool, forcibly kissed her in a church after presiding over a wedding, and fondled her while on a day trip to Sacramento. After returning home, Nancy revealed the abuse to her parents, who complained to DeGroot. DeGroot confronted O'Grady, who confessed, and drove him to Stockton to meet meet then-Bishop of Stockton Merlin Guilfoyle. Guilfoyle took no disciplinary action against O'Grady, but recommended that he seek psychiatric counseling at the diocese's expense. The Sloan family did not press criminal charges or sue, instead accepting the diocese's offer to pay for therapy for Nancy. In August 1976, O'Grady wrote a letter, at DeGroot's urging, to the Sloan parents apologizing for molesting their daughter. A copy of this letter was retained in O'Grady's personnel file at the Diocese of Stockton chancery office and would go on to become a significant piece of evidence in trials involving the diocese.

=== Sacred Heart Church, Turlock ===
In 1977, Bishop Guilfoyle reassigned O'Grady to be an associate pastor at Sacred Heart Church in Turlock, California, which had a parish school with around 200 students. There, he met Roland and Ann Howard, who lived in Turlock with their nine children and were members of the parish. O'Grady soon began sexually abusing two of their sons, James and Joh Howard. The abuse, which began when James and Joh were in preschool, continued off and on for roughly a decade. O'Grady also began an affair with the boys' mother Ann, which continued after the Howard family moved to nearby Merced.

In October 1980, Roland Howard wrote a letter to the newly-installed Bishop of Stockton, Roger Mahony, notifying the bishop that he and his wife had separated and complaining about O'Grady's frequent visits to his wife and children, including taking his two-year-old son out for the day alone. Mahony summoned O'Grady to meet and ordered the priest to stay away from the Howard family. Nonetheless, O'Grady continued abusing the Howard children in the years after.

=== Church of the Presentation, Stockton ===
In 1982, Bishop Mahony transferred O'Grady to the Church of the Presentation of the Blessed Virgin Mary in Stockton. He served as an associate priest at the parish, which had a school with nearly 300 students. In October 1984, Monsignor James Cain, the Diocese of Stockton's vicar general, approached a local Catholic psychiatric social worker to provide counseling for O'Grady. The counselor, William Guttieri, was a parishioner of O'Grady's church in Stockton and was a social acquaintance of the priest. During one of their sessions, O'Grady discussed his sexual involvement with a young boy (later found to be James Howard). Adhering to his obligations as a mandated reporter, Guttieri reported O'Grady's admission to the Stockton police and San Joaquin County Child Protective Services, and also informed the diocese's lawyer.

The Stockton police began an investigation and sent detective Jerald Cranston to interview Ann Howard, who acknowledged that O'Grady occasionally spent nights in her home and that O'Grady had taken some of her children on overnight visits to his rectory in Stockton. Nine-year-old James Howard, the alleged victim, had been asleep and did not testify that he had been molested. Cranston later received a call from the diocese's lawyer, who told him the diocese had conducted its own interview with O'Grady and believed the alleged molestation was an isolated incident. The lawyer also assured the detective that the church would provide O'Grady with counseling and would re-assign him to a new role without any direct involvement with children. As a result, the police declined to file charges.

=== St. Andrew's Church, San Andreas ===
Bishop Mahony sent O'Grady to a psychiatrist for a fresh evaluation, which was the diocese's standard procedure at the time for handling pedophile priests. In December 1984, before the results of the evaluation were received, Mahony moved O'Grady to a new parish, St. Andrew's Church in San Andreas, a small community about an hour outside Stockton. There, O'Grady served as parish administrator, working alongside the parish's elderly pastor emeritus. He was later promoted to pastor, overseeing the main church along with several missions. St. Andrew's did not have a school, but O'Grady testified that he oversaw the parish's religious education program, which enrolled hundreds of students who came in for classes on afternoons and weekends.

The psychiatrist's report ordered by Bishop Mahony arrived three weeks after O'Grady began his new assignment in San Andreas. In the report, the psychiatrist, John Morris, wrote that O'Grady had admitted to molesting children, though without specifying how many and for how long. Morris concluded that O'Grady exhibited serious sexual and social immaturity and urged that the priest be given "spiritual" help. The following year, Mahony himself was transferred and promoted, becoming the Archbishop of Los Angeles.

While in San Andreas, O'Grady continued sexually abusing James and Joh Howard, and also began abusing two of the boys' siblings. He also continued his long-distance relationship with Ann Howard, who was still living in Merced. He also began another affair with a young married woman, known as Jane Doe, who, along with her husband and two children, were members of the parish. O'Grady soon became close with the family, showering their elementary-school-age son with gifts and attention and volunteering to babysit for their infant daughter. The priest provided pastoral counseling to the wife, who struggled with depression and her husband's excessive alcohol use. Their emotional involvement grew into a year-long affair, starting with a sexual encounter during a counseling session at the church rectory in 1992.

=== St. Anthony's Church, Hughson ===
In 1992, O'Grady was re-assigned to serve as pastor at St. Anthony's Church in Hughson, California.

In 1993, O'Grady traveled to San Diego to attend the wedding of a Howard family relative. At the reception, one of the Howard sons had a furious outburst at O'Grady after noticing the priest giving special attention to one of his younger brothers. O'Grady returned to San Andreas after the wedding as planned, but the incident led four of the Howard children to realize they had each been victimized by the priest without any of the others knowing. In June 1993, one of the Howards' grown daughters called Jane Doe in San Andreas, informing her that she and three of her brothers had been abused by O'Grady and warning her that the priest may now have moved on to her children. Shortly after the call, Jane Doe, Ann Howard, and Ann Howard's daughter and her boyfriend drove to Hughson to confront O'Grady. A scuffle broke out between O'Grady and the boyfriend, and the priest grabbed a phone to call 911. Police arrived within minutes and took a disturbance report, but made no arrests.

== Crimes ==
In 1993, he was convicted on four counts of "lewd and lascivious acts" on two minors, the brothers Joseph and James Howard, and was sentenced to 14 years in prison. Attorney Jeff Anderson said O'Grady repeatedly molested the Howards between 1978 and 1991, from age three to 13. Anderson claimed church officials knew that O'Grady had abused children as early as 1976 and 1984, but had done nothing. Police had been informed of earlier charges and had declined to file charges. Bishop Roger Mahony sent O'Grady to a psychiatrist for an evaluation and the second opinion said the counseling was satisfactory; the second opinion did not recommend he be removed from ministry, nor established a diagnosis of pedophilia." In 1998 a civil jury ordered the Catholic Diocese of Stockton to pay US$30 million in damages to the brothers. A judge later reduced the amount to $7 million. O'Grady was paroled from prison in 2000 after serving seven years, and went to Ireland after being deported from the United States.

In a 2005 videotaped deposition, O'Grady claimed he abused at least as many as 25 children in and around Northern California. There have been lawsuits filed accusing O'Grady of abusing children while a seminarian in Ireland.

== Film ==
O'Grady is the subject of Amy J. Berg's documentary film Deliver Us from Evil in 2006. O'Grady said he wanted the film to serve as the "most honest confession of [his] life." He details how he preyed on children, and claims Church officials knew about his abuses but protected him by moving him from parish to parish. O'Grady confirmed that his bishop knew that there were claims that he had abused children in 1976 and before, and that the diocese responded by transferring him to another parish. The film ends by saying that O'Grady is free in Ireland, but that an American priest is making efforts to see that he and other abusers are monitored.

== Later life ==
Since his deportation to Ireland in 2001, he has been reported as living in Waterford city and the Dublin suburb of Phibsboro. In October, 2006, it was reported that he had left Ireland possibly for France and "may be en route to Canada". In 2007 the Irish Examiner reported O'Grady's solicitor claiming O'Grady registered voluntarily with the local Gardaí. In October 2007, the rented house where he was living in Dundalk was burgled and damaged. In October 2008, it was reported that California-based lawyers were considering offering a reward for information about his whereabouts in Ireland so further civil actions could be pursued against him.

In March 2010 the Sunday Tribune reported that he was living in Rotterdam, the Netherlands, where he volunteered at a Catholic parish, assuming a different identity, calling himself "Brother Francis"; Father Avin Kunnekkadan, the priest in charge of the parish denied knowing about his criminal past. O'Grady was subsequently dismissed from his positions. In December 2010, he was arrested in Dublin for possession of child pornography. The victims were as young as two years old. Authorities discovered child pornographic photos and videos on O'Grady's laptop, on an external hard drive, and on a USB flash drive. Judge Patrick McMahon remanded O'Grady on continuing bail to appear again on 28 January. As part of his bail conditions, O'Grady was required to sign on twice daily at Dublin's Harcourt Terrace Garda station and surrender his passport. In January 2012, O'Grady was sentenced to three years in prison in Ireland for possession of child pornography.

By 2016, the Irish Sun reported that O'Grady returned to Waterford, lived across the street from a playground and was attempting to remove his criminal history from the Internet. In 2018, Bishop Alphonsus Cullinan distributed a letter warning residents of the Waterford area alerting them of O'Grady's activities, noting that he is an "extremely dangerous paedophile" and "actively seeking victims in our midst". Cullinan also stated in the letter that the Gardaí had been informed of O'Grady's recent activities.

In October 2019, O’Grady was arrested in the Algarve area of Portugal. According to statement from Portuguese police, he is suspected of child pornography offences. He was extradited from Portugal to Ireland and appeared before an Irish court in November 2019. In October 2020, a jury in Waterford convicted O'Grady of possession of child pornography. O'Grady accepted the guilty verdict and was sentenced by the Waterford Circuit Court to 22 months in prison.

== See also ==
- Catholic sex abuse cases
- Roger Mahony - Sexual abuse cover-ups
