= Diocese of Stockton =

Latin Catholic ecclesiastical jurisdiction in California, USA

Coordinates: 37°58′32″N 121°18′03″W

Diocese of Stockton Diœcesis Stocktoniensis
- The coat of arms of the Diocese of Stockton

Location
- Country: United States
- Territory: Counties of Alpine, Calaveras, Mono, San Joaquin, Stanislaus and Tuolumne
- Ecclesiastical province: San Francisco

Statistics
- Population: Total; Catholics: (as of 2017); 1,376,940; 298,061 (21.6%)
- Parishes: 35

Information
- Denomination: Catholic Church
- Sui iuris church: Latin Church
- Rite: Roman Rite
- Established: January 13, 1962
- Cathedral: Cathedral of the Annunciation
- Patron saint: Our Lady of the Annunciation
- Secular priests: 105

Current leadership
- Pope: Leo XIV
- Bishop: Myron Joseph Cotta
- Metropolitan Archbishop: Salvatore Cordileone

Map
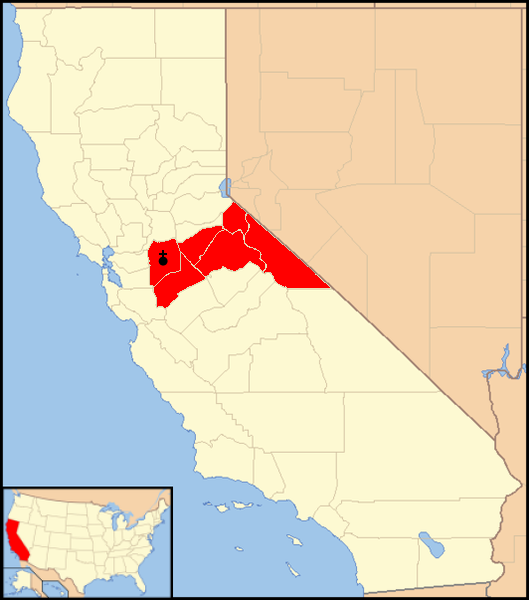

Website
- stocktondiocese.org

The Diocese of Stockton (Latin: Diœcesis Stocktoniensis) is a diocese of the Catholic Church in the Central Valley and Mother Lode region of California in the United States. It is a suffragan diocese of the Archdiocese of San Francisco. The mother church is the Cathedral of the Annunciation in Stockton.

== Extent and statistics ==
As of 2022, the Diocese of Stockton served 233,000 Catholics in 35 parishes. It had 86 priests (72 diocesan, 14 religious), 50 deacons, 63 lay religious (14 brothers, 49 sisters) and eight seminarians.

The diocese covers the counties of Alpine, Calaveras, Mono, San Joaquin, Stanislaus and Tuolumne, with most of the diocese population living in the San Joaquin Valley. The diocese provides service to the many migrant camps in the region.

The largest racial/ethnic groups in the diocese are White and Hispanic. The largest Azorean Portuguese population outside the Azores is found in the diocese.

The largest Asian community in the diocese is Filipino, followed by the Vietnamese community. The USCCB statement Asian and Pacific Presence lists the diocese of Stockton as among the top thirty dioceses in the United States with the highest Asian and Pacific Island population.

== History ==
Pope John XXIII erected the Diocese of Stockton on January 13, 1962, taking Calaveras, Mono, San Joaquin, Stanislaus, and Tuolumne counties from the Archdiocese of San Francisco and the Diocese of Sacramento. The pope named Auxiliary Bishop Hugh Donohoe of San Francisco as the first bishop of Stockton. On September 15, 1966, the Vatican transferred Alpine County from Sacramento to the Diocese of Stockton. Donohoe became bishop of the Diocese of Fresno in 1969.

The second bishop of Stockton was Auxiliary Bishop Merlin Guilfoyle of San Francisco, appointed by Pope Paul VI in 1969. Guilfoyle retired in 1979. To replace Guilfoyle, Pope John Paul II selected Auxiliary Bishop Roger Mahony of Fresno in 1980. Five years later, in 1985, Mahony became archbishop of the Archdiocese of Los Angeles.

Auxiliary Bishop Donald Montrose of Los Angeles was the next bishop of Stockton, named by John Paul II in 1985. Montrose focused on getting Spanish-speaking priests in the diocese, traveling to Mexico, Colombia and other Latin American countries to recruit them. In 1988, Montrose succeeded in persuading the Sisters of the Cross to relocate to Modesto from Mexico. Montrose retired in 1999.

John Paul II appointed Auxiliary Bishop Stephen Blaire of Los Angeles in 1999 as the new bishop of Stockton. In 2014, the diocese filed for Chapter 11 Bankruptcy, which was later granted in 2017. As a result of the bankruptcy agreement, approximately $15 million was to be paid to sexual abuse victims of diocesan clergy. Blaire retired in 2018.

Diocesan logo

As of 2023, the current bishop of the Diocese of Stockton is Myron J. Cotta, formerly an auxiliary bishop from Sacramento. He was appointed by Pope Francis in 2018.

In November 2023, vandals sprayed white paint on the doors and exterior walls of the Cathedral of the Annunciation in Stockton. No arrests were made.

=== Sex abuse ===
In 1998 a jury awarded two brothers a $30 million judgement against the diocese in a sexual abuse case. The plaintiffs had accused the priest Oliver O'Grady of sexually abusing them from 1978 to 1991. A 1984 police report showed that a diocese attorney had promised to get O'Grady away from minors. However, Bishop Mahony transferred him that same year to a different parish. In 1993, O'Grady pleaded guilty to sexually abusing the plaintiffs and was sentenced to 14 years in prison.

In 2001, Bishop Blaire learned of allegations that in 1997 Rev. Oscar Pelaez had molested a 14-year-old at Sacred Heart Church in Turlock. Blaire suspended Pelaez from priestly duties, but did not report the allegations. Pelaez pleaded guilty to 13 counts of abuse and was sentenced to six years in prison.

== Bishops ==
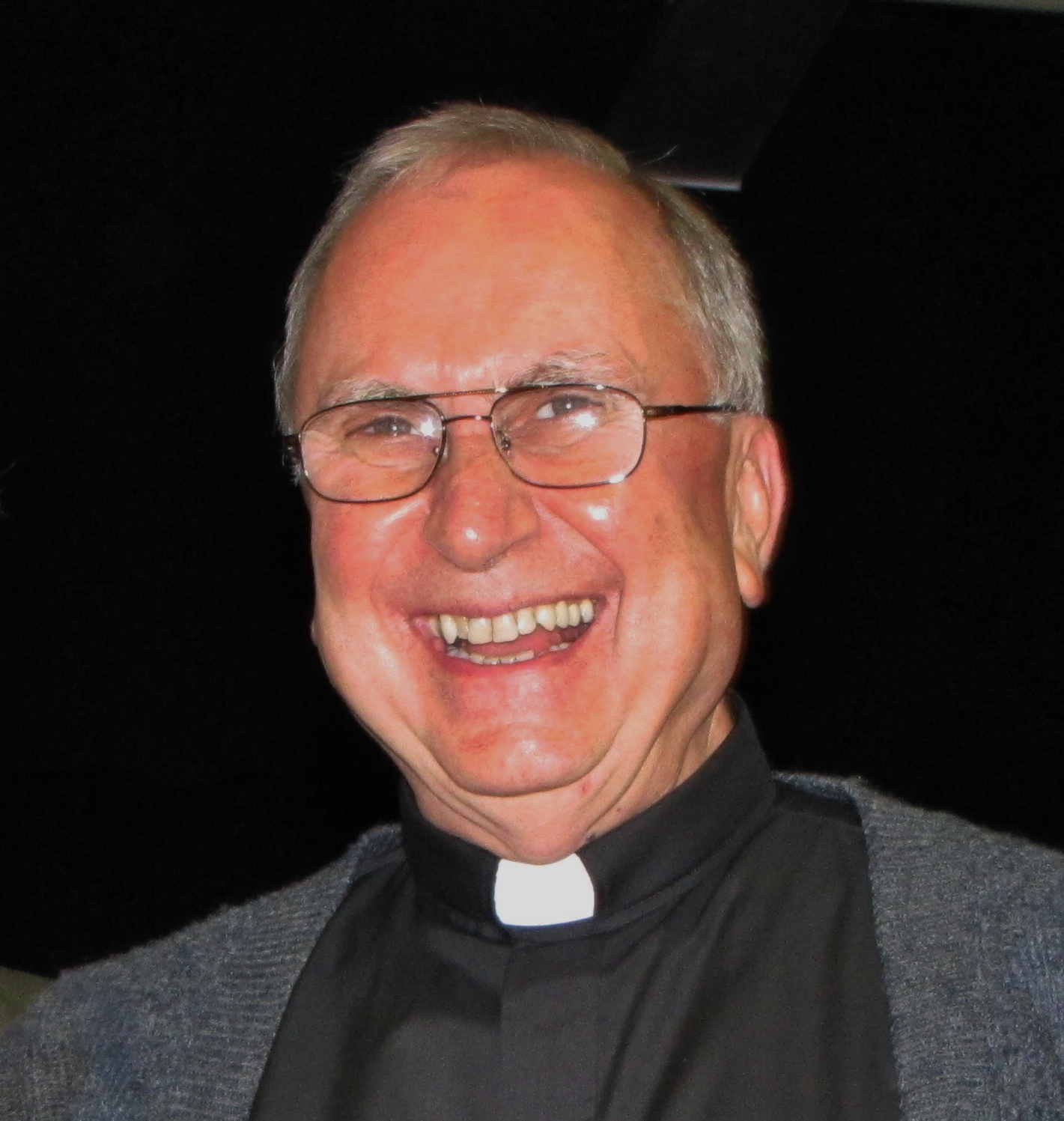
Bishop Blaire (2010)

=== Bishops of Stockton ===
1. Hugh Aloysius Donohoe (1962-1969), appointed Bishop of Fresno
2. Merlin Guilfoyle (1970-1979)
3. Roger Mahony (1980-1985), appointed Archbishop of Los Angeles (Cardinal in 1991)
4. Donald Montrose (1985-1999)
5. Stephen Blaire (1999-2018)
6. Myron Joseph Cotta (2018–present)

=== Other diocesan priest who became bishop ===
Ramon Bejarano, appointed auxiliary bishop of San Diego in 2020

== Parishes ==
The Diocese of Stockton consists of eight deaneries.

== Education ==
=== High schools ===
As of 2025, the Diocese of the Stockton has the following high schools:

- Central Catholic High School – Modesto
- St. Mary's High School – Stockton

=== Elementary/middle schools ===
As of 2025, the Diocese of the Stockton has the following elementary/middle schools.

== Sources and External links ==
- Roman Catholic Diocese of Stockton Official Site
- GCatholic, with Google map
- Roman Catholic Archdiocese of San Francisco
