= Roger Mahony =

American Catholic bishop and cardinal (born 1936)

His Eminence Roger Michael Mahony KGCHS
- Cardinal; Archbishop Emeritus of Los Angeles
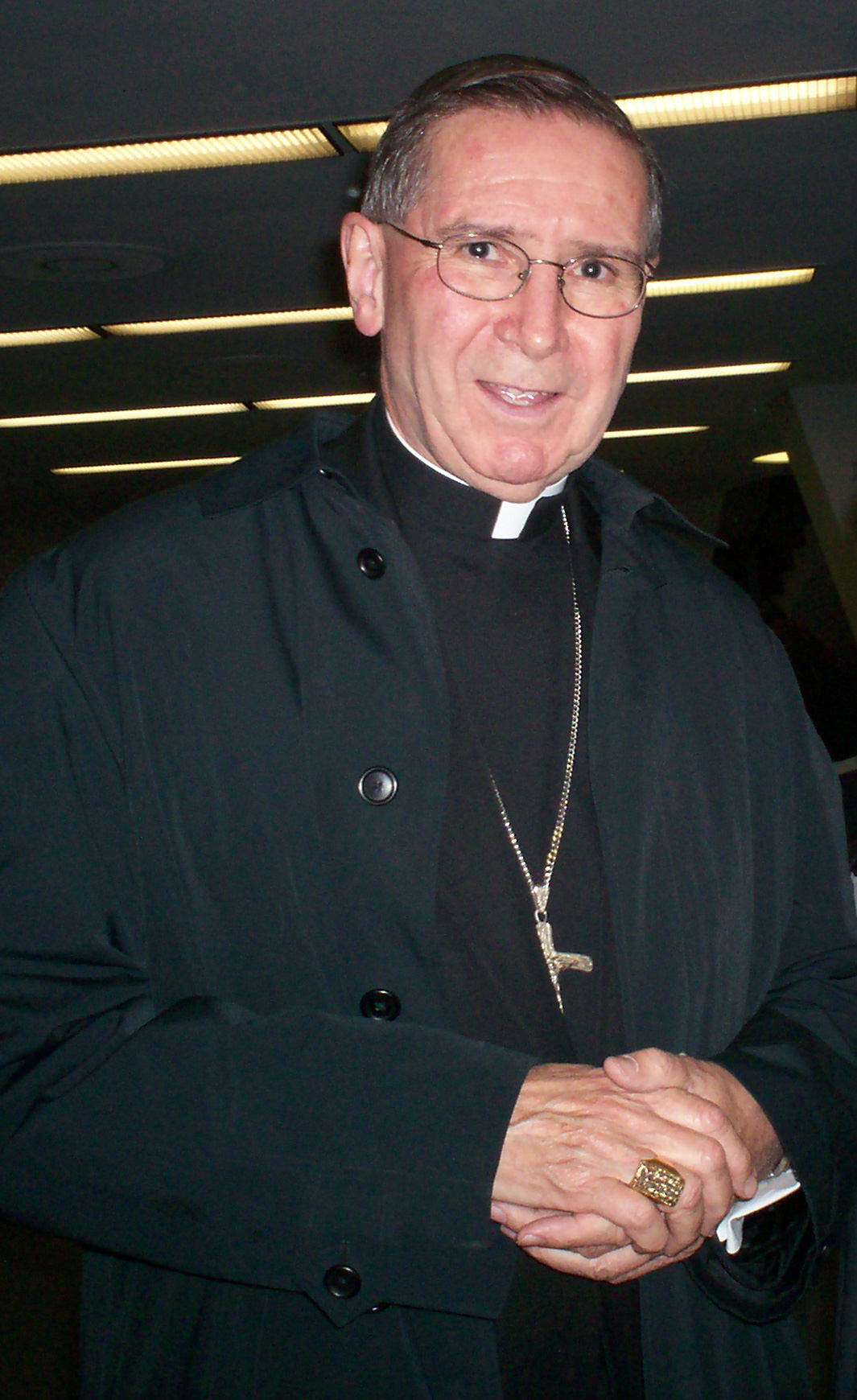
- Cardinal Mahony in March 2006
- Archdiocese: Los Angeles
- Appointed: July 12, 1985
- Installed: September 5, 1985
- Retired: March 1, 2011
- Predecessor: Timothy Manning
- Successor: José Horacio Gómez
- Other post: Cardinal-Priest of Ss. Quattro Coronati
- Previous posts: Bishop of Stockton (1980–1985); Auxiliary Bishop of Fresno and Titular Bishop of Tamascani (1975–1980)

Orders
- Ordination: May 1, 1962 by Aloysius Joseph Willinger
- Consecration: March 19, 1975 by Hugh Aloysius Donohoe, William Robert Johnson, and John Stephen Cummins
- Created cardinal: June 28, 1991 by John Paul II
- Rank: Cardinal-Priest

Personal details
- Born: February 27, 1936 (age 90) Los Angeles, California, US
- Denomination: Catholic Church
- Parents: Victor and Loretta Mahony
- Education: Catholic University of America
- Motto: To reconcile God's people
- Styles
- Reference style: His Eminence
- Spoken style: Your Eminence
- Religious style: Cardinal
- Informal style: Cardinal
- See: Los Angeles (Emeritus)

Ordination history
History
Priestly ordination
- Ordained by: Aloysius Joseph Willinger
- Date: May 1, 1962
Episcopal consecration
- Consecrated by: Hugh Aloysius Donohoe (Fresno)
- Date: March 19, 1975
Cardinalate
- Elevated by: Pope John Paul II
- Date: June 28, 1991
Episcopal succession
Bishops consecrated by Roger Mahony as principal consecrator
- George Patrick Ziemann: February 23, 1987
- Armando Xavier Ochoa: February 23, 1987
- Carl Anthony Fisher: February 23, 1987
- Sylvester Donovan Ryan: May 31, 1990
- Stephen Edward Blaire: May 31, 1990
- Joseph Martin Sartoris: March 19, 1994
- Thomas John Curry: March 19, 1994
- Gabino Zavala: March 19, 1994
- George Hugh Niederauer: January 25, 1995
- Gerald Eugene Wilkerson: January 21, 1998
- Edward William Clark: March 26, 2001
- Oscar A. Solis: February 10, 2004
- Alexander Salazar: November 4, 2004

Roger Michael Mahony KGCHS (born February 27, 1936) is an American Catholic retired prelate who served as archbishop of Los Angeles in California from 1985 to 2011. He previously served as an auxiliary bishop of the Diocese of Fresno in California from 1975 to 1980 and bishop of the Diocese of Stockton in California from 1980 to 1985.

Born in Los Angeles and raised in the San Fernando Valley, Mahony was ordained to the priesthood in 1962. He was appointed auxiliary bishop of Fresno in January 1975 and consecrated bishop in March 1975. Mahony was then appointed bishop of Stockton in 1980. In 1985, he was appointed archbishop of Los Angeles by Pope John Paul II, and became the first Los Angeles native to hold the office. The pope created Mahony a cardinal in 1991, and he voted in the papal conclaves that elected Popes Benedict XVI and Francis.

During his tenure as Los Angeles archbishop, Mahony was instrumental in dividing the archdiocese into five administrative subdivisions and in guiding the construction of the Cathedral of Our Lady of the Angels, which opened in September 2002. Mahony has also been identified as a key figure in the cover-up of the Catholic Church sexual abuse scandal, where dozens of abusive priests were moved to other churches rather than prosecuted. In 2007, the Archdiocese of Los Angeles apologized for abuses by priests and announced a record-breaking settlement of $660 million for 508 victims.

In 2011, Mahony reached the mandatory retirement age for bishops and was succeeded by Archbishop José H. Gómez on March 1. On January 31, 2013, Gómez relieved Mahony of his public and episcopal duties in the archdiocese, following the release of personnel files documenting priests' sexual abuse during Mahony's tenure.

== Early life and priesthood ==
Roger Mahony was born on February 27, 1936, in the Hollywood district of Los Angeles, the son of Victor and Loretta (née Baron) Mahony. He has a twin brother, Louis, and an older brother, Neil. Roger Mahony attended St. Charles Borromeo Grammar School in North Hollywood and Los Angeles College.

After studying at the Our Lady Queen of Angels Seminary and St. John's Seminary, Mahony was ordained to the priesthood for the Diocese of Fresno on May 1, 1962, by Bishop Aloysius Joseph Willinger.

Mahony graduated from Catholic University of America in Washington, D.C., in 1964 with a Master of Social Work degree. For the next 13 years, Mahony held pastoral and curial assignments in the Diocese of Monterey-Fresno and later in the newly formed Diocese of Fresno. He also taught social work at Fresno State University in Fresno, California. Mahony was named a monsignor in February 1967.

== Auxiliary Bishop of Fresno ==
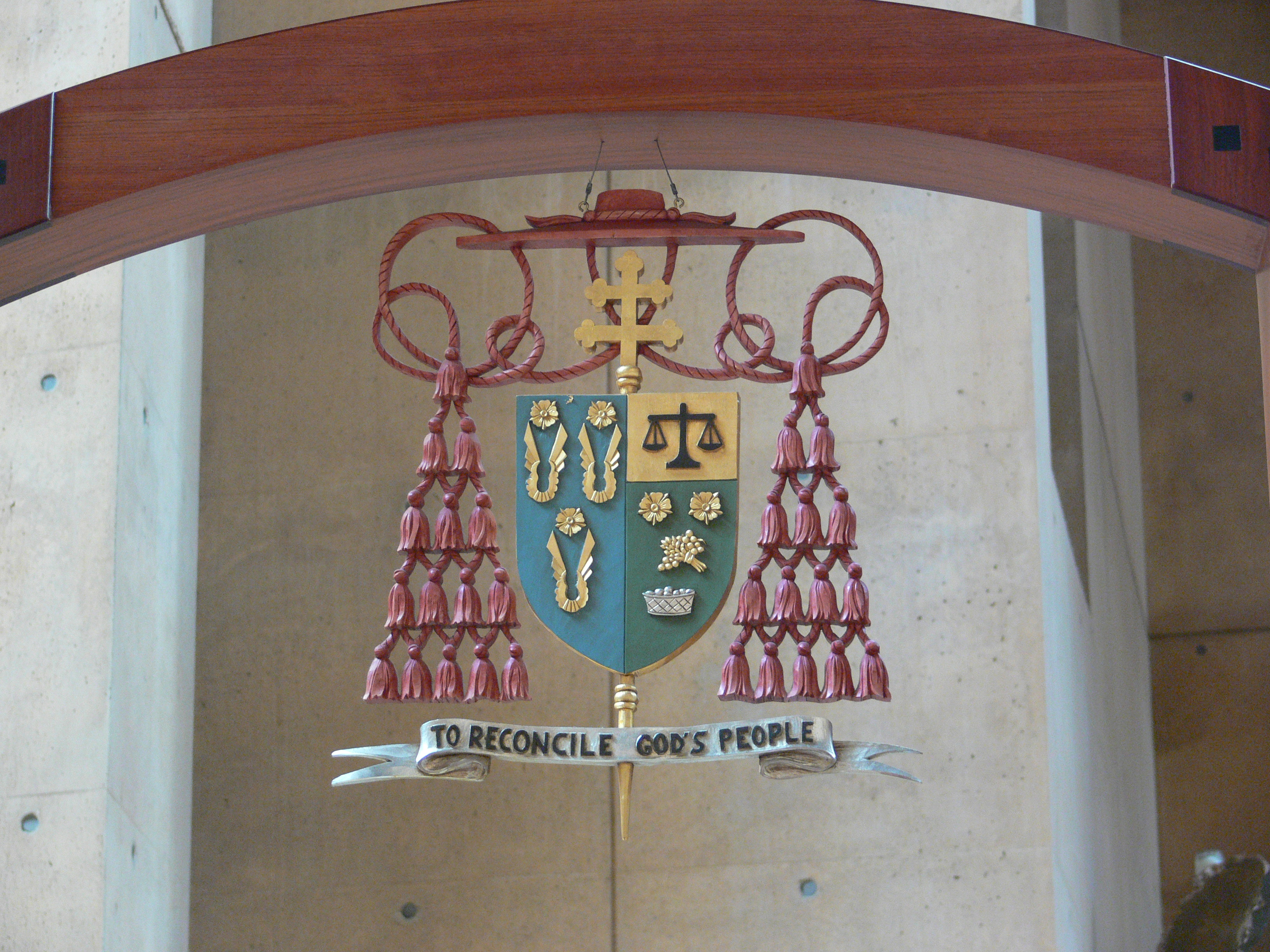
Mahony's coat of arms on the cathedra, Cathedral of Our Lady of the Angels, Los Angeles, California (2008)

On January 7, 1975, Mahony was appointed as auxiliary bishop of Fresno and titular bishop of Tamascani by Pope Paul VI. He received his episcopal consecration on March 19, 1975, in Fresno from Bishop Hugh A. Donohoe, with Bishops William R. Johnson and John S. Cummins serving as co-consecrators.

Also in 1975, California Governor Jerry Brown appointed Mahony as chair of the California Agricultural Labor Relations Board. As chair, he worked to resolve labor disputes between the United Farm Workers, the farmworkers union, and growers.

== Bishop of Stockton ==
On February 15, 1980, Mahony was appointed Bishop of Stockton by Pope John Paul II, as announced by the nuncio, Jean Jadot. Mahony terminated two extern priests for sexual abuse during his tenure at Stockton.

In 1980, shortly after Mahony became Bishop of Stockton, a parent wrote to the diocese accusing the Fr Oliver O'Grady of molesting his two sons. Mahony in 1982 then transferred O'Grady to another parish. Soon more accusations arose from the new parish. In 1984, the local police closed an investigation into O'Grady after a diocesan lawyer promised to keep him away from children. In December 1984, despite the earlier promise, Mahony transferred O'Grady to another parish.

In 1998, Mahony, then Archbishop of Los Angeles, returned to Stockton to testify in a civil trial against the diocese. A jury later awarded $30 million in damages to two of O'Grady's victims.

== Archbishop of Los Angeles and Cardinal-Priest ==
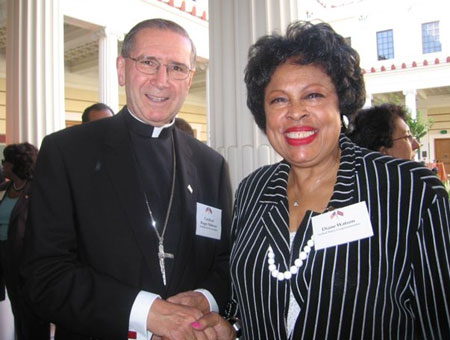
Cardinal Mahony with U.S. Congresswoman Diane Watson (2008)

On July 16, 1985, Mahony was appointed as Archbishop of Los Angeles by John Paul II, becoming the first native Angeleno to hold that office. He was created cardinal-priest of the Basilica dei Santi Quattro Coronati in Rome by John Paul II in the consistory of June 28, 1991.

The 1994 Northridge earthquake necessitated the abandonment of the Cathedral of Saint Vibiana. Mahony then began planning the new $190 million Cathedral of Our Lady of the Angels. Many Catholics were upset about its non-traditional design and high project cost. In response, Mahony noted that foundations and donors were funding the new cathedral, not parishes. He also said that the archdiocese needed a mother church and religious center to unite its people. One of the largest Catholic churches in the United States, the new cathedral was dedicated on September 2, 2002.

In 1987, Mahony announced the auction of the Doheny rare book collection at St. John's Seminary in Camarillo, California. The philanthropist Carrie Estelle Doheny had donated the collection to the seminary during the 1940s and 1950s. It included a Gutenberg Bible and a first edition of the 1885 novel The Adventures of Huckleberry Finn by Mark Twain. Mahony cited the financial needs of the archdiocese and the high cost of insuring the collection as the reasons for its sale. The proceeds were intended to fund an endowment for training new priests.

The Doheny auction raised $37.8 million for the archdiocese. However, by 1996 the archdiocese had spent as much as $25 million of the proceeds on other projects, including $1 million to renovate Mahony's residence.

During Mahony's tenure in Los Angeles, the number of priests declined while the number of lay ministers increased. Mahony remarked on this:

"What some refer to as a 'vocations crisis' is, rather, one of the many fruits of the Second Vatican Council. It is a sign of God's deep love for the Church, and an invitation to a more creative and effective ordering of gifts and energy in the Body of Christ."

In May 1998, Mahony announced he had been diagnosed with prostate cancer. He underwent a prostatectomy on June 15, 1998; doctors said that the surgery was successful. Mahony was a cardinal elector in the 2005 papal conclave that selected Pope Benedict XVI.

== Retirement and legacy ==
On April 6, 2010, Pope Benedict XVI named Archbishop José H. Gómez as the coadjutor archbishop in Los Angeles to assist Mahony. After the Vatican accepted Mahony's resignation as archbishop of Los Angeles on February 28, 2011, Gómez automatically succeeded him. The formal ceremony of transition was held at the Cathedral of Our Lady of the Angels, with Mahony's resignation taking canonical effect on March 1, 2011.

In his retirement, Mahony said that he planned to devote more time to advocacy for immigrants. He took up residence at the rectory in St. Charles Borromeo Church in North Hollywood.

On January 31, 2013, Gómez relieved Mahony of all of his remaining public and administrative duties due to his actions during the Church's sexual abuse crisis. Mahony remained "a priest in good standing" and could still celebrate mass, but could no longer speak publicly or exercise a bishop's responsibilities, such as performing confirmations.

In February 2013, following public discussion of clergy files released by the Archdiocese of Los Angeles, Archbishop José H. Gomez issued two clarifying statements regarding the status of Cardinal Roger Mahony and Bishop Thomas Curry. In press releases dated February 1 and February 15, 2013, Gomez stated that both prelates “remain bishops in good standing in the Archdiocese of Los Angeles” with “full rights to celebrate the Holy Sacraments of the Church and to minister to the faithful without restriction.” He further affirmed that Cardinal Mahony retained “all of the prerogatives and privileges of his standing as a Cardinal of the Roman Catholic Church.” These clarifications supplemented the initial January 31 statement that had received broader media attention.

Following the February 2013 resignation of Pope Benedict XVI, some Catholic groups objected to Mahony's voting in a papal conclave so soon after his censure. However, Mahony participated in the conclave in March 2013 that elected Pope Francis.

In April 2025, after the death of Pope Francis, Mahony traveled to Rome and participated in the Rite of Sealing of the Coffin as the most senior Cardinal-priest able to travel.

== Other offices ==
- Board member, Catholic University of America
- Member, United States Conference of Catholic Bishops (USCCB) Committees on Liturgy, Pro-Life Activities, and Migration & Refugees
- Member, Pontifical Council for Justice and Peace (1984–1989)
- Member, Pontifical Council for the Pastoral Care of Migrants and Itinerants (1986–1991)
- Member, Pontifical Council for Social Communications (1989–2000)
- Member, Prefecture for the Economic Affairs of the Holy See (2000–2019)
- Member, Congregation for Eastern Churches

== Viewpoints ==
=== Abortion ===
In 2021, Mahony criticized “The Mystery of the Eucharist in the Life of the Church”, a resolution proposed in the USCCB. The resolution called on bishops to ban from all Catholic public officials from receiving the eucharist who supported abortion rights for women. Mahony stated,

“First of all, we are a democratic republic. Our country’s path is one of separation of church and state. And so, it’s a very difficult position for politicians, Catholics, who are pressured by some in the Church to make all of the decisions based on Catholic Church doctrine.”

=== Films ===
In 1992, Mahony published a pastoral letter Film Makers, Film Viewers on the topic of television news and the entertainment industry. In the letter, he rejected film censorship, instead advocating that filmmakers and television writers strive for "human values" when portraying sexual situations and violence in their products.

=== Immigration ===
Mahony criticized certain provisions in the Border Protection, Anti-terrorism, and Illegal Immigration Control Act of 2005 (H.R. 4437), introduced by Republican members of the US House of Representatives. He told US President George W. Bush that the bill would effectively prevent the Catholic Church from providing charitable assistance and religious ministry to undocumented immigrants. In May 2006, Mahony announced that he would order his clergy and lay people to ignore the law if it were passed.

Mahony personally lobbied the US senators from California, Barbara Boxer and Dianne Feinstein, to have the US Senate consider a comprehensive immigration reform bill, rather than the House bill. Mahony also blamed the US Congress for the illegal immigration crisis, due to its failure to act on the issue over the previous 20 years. He supported instead the Comprehensive Immigration Reform Act of 2006. Neither plan passed Congress.

=== Mass ===
Mahony in September 1997 published a pastoral letter on the mass entitled "Gather Faithfully Together: A Guide for Sunday Mass". The letter called all parishes to plan and celebrate each Sunday mass in order to deepen the faith-life of all Catholics through the eucharist.

Mother Angelica, the host of a popular program on the Eternal Word Television Network, commented in June 2010 that she believed "Gather Faithfully Together" was inconsistent with existing official liturgical directives set by the Vatican.

== Sexual abuse scandal in Los Angeles ==
In 1988, Mahony adopted what he termed as a zero-tolerance policy on sexual abuse allegations against clergy. In 1992, at a national meeting of Catholic bishops, Mahony stated that the Catholic Church needed to do more to combat sexual abuse of minors. In March 2002, he ordered the removal of 12 priests in the archdiocese from ministry due to credible accusations of sexual abuse.

In February 2004, the archdiocese issued the Report to the People of God. The report contained an apology from Mahony for the failing of the archdiocese in handling accusations of sexual abuse. It included a detailed list of priests and circumstances in cases of known abuse. It also described the development of archdiocesan policy related to sexual abuse, and case studies of accused priests. It included details of the most significant cases in the archdiocese's history. However, Report to the People of God failed to include information on 33 priests who were accused of sexual abuse, but whose cases lacked confirmatory evidence. Despite strong criticism from the media, the archdiocese blocked the release of this information.

In 2007, the archdiocese apologized again for abuses by priests and announced a legal settlement of $660 million to 508 victims, averaging $1.3 million per plaintiff. Mahony described the abuse as a "terrible sin and crime". The agreement settled all outstanding civil lawsuits at that time against the archdiocese.

In 2013, after Mahony's retirement as archbishop, the archdiocese released memos written by Auxiliary Bishop Thomas J. Curry to Mahony in 1986 and 1987, discussing potential legal accountability for priests accused of sexual abuse. Curry recommended that the archdiocese encourage priests seeking therapy to avoid using therapists who might report them to law enforcement. At the same time, Mahony wrote the director of the Servants of the Paracletes center in New Mexico, which treated priests who had committed sexual abuse. Mahony wanted to prevent any of his priests at the center from returning to Los Angeles. He cited possible lawsuits by their victims, whom the archdiocese had been assured that the priests would never return.

In February 2020, Mahony was named as a defendant in a lawsuit where he was accused of shielding convicted ex-priest Michael Baker. In April 2021, Mahony was accused in a lawsuit of sexually molesting a teenage boy.

== See also ==
- Catholic Church hierarchy
- Catholic Church in the United States
- Historical list of the Catholic bishops of the United States
- List of Catholic bishops of the United States
- Lists of patriarchs, archbishops, and bishops

== Episcopal succession ==
Catholic Church titles
| Preceded by Julijans Vaivods | Cardinal Priest of Santi Quattro Coronati; 1991–present | Incumbent |
| Preceded by Timothy Manning | Roman Catholic Archbishop of Los Angeles; 1985–2011 | Succeeded by José Horacio Gómez |
| Preceded by Merlin Joseph Guilfoyle | Roman Catholic Bishop of Stockton; 1980–1985 | Succeeded by Donald William Montrose |
| Preceded by - | Auxiliary Bishop of Fresno; 1975–1980 | Succeeded by - |
| Preceded by Simon Tonyé | — TITULAR — Bishop of Tamascani; 1975–1980 | Succeeded by Jerzy Dabrowski |
