= Edward Joseph Hanna =

American Catholic prelate (1860-1944)

The Most Reverend Edward Joseph Hanna
- Archbishop Emeritus of San Francisco
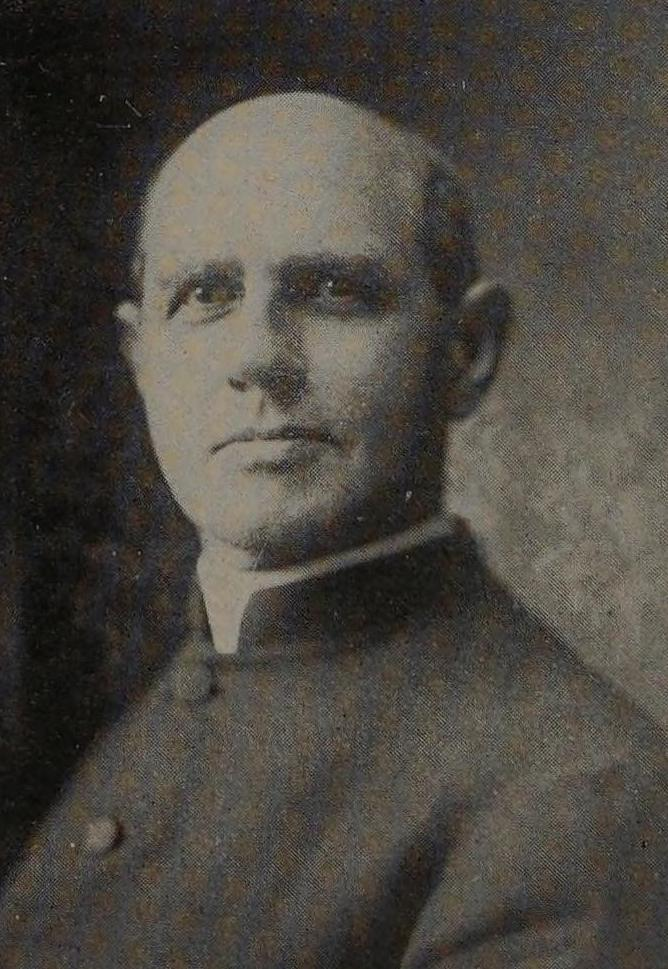
- Hanna in 1913
- Church: Catholic Church
- Archdiocese: San Francisco
- Appointed: June 1, 1915
- Retired: March 2, 1935
- Predecessor: Patrick William Riordan
- Successor: John Joseph Mitty
- Other post: Titular Archbishop of Gortyna (1935–1944)
- Previous posts: Auxiliary Bishop of San Francisco (1912–1915); Titular Bishop of Titiopolis (1912–1915)

Orders
- Ordination: May 30, 1885 by Giulio Lenti
- Consecration: December 4, 1912 by Giovanni Bonzano

Personal details
- Born: July 21, 1860 Rochester, New York, U.S.
- Died: July 10, 1944 (aged 83) Rome, Kingdom of Italy
- Motto: Christus Regnet (Latin for 'Christ Reigns')
- Coat of arms

Edward Joseph Hanna (July 21, 1860 – July 10, 1944) was an American Catholic prelate who served as Archbishop of San Francisco from 1915 to 1935. He was also the first chairman of the National Catholic Welfare Council, a precursor to the United States Conference of Catholic Bishops.

== Early life and education ==
Edward Joseph Hanna was born on July 21, 1860, in Rochester, New York. His father, Edward Hanna Sr., was born in County Down in Northern Ireland and worked as a cooper. His mother, Anne Hanna (née Clark), was born in County Cavan, also in Northern Ireland. Hanna was the eldest of six children; he had two brothers and three sisters, one of whom died in infancy and another who joined the Society of the Sacred Heart.

Hanna went to a local public school for one year before the Diocese of Rochester was erected in 1868 and his parents enrolled him at the parochial school of St. Patrick's Cathedral. From 1875 to 1879, he attended the Rochester Free Academy. He graduated as valedictorian of his class, which included Walter Rauschenbusch, a future Baptist theologian and proponent of the Social Gospel. At the commencement ceremony, he delivered a well-received oration on Irish political leader Daniel O'Connell.

Deciding to become a priest, Hanna was accepted as a candidate by Bishop Bernard John McQuaid and sent to study in Rome. He took courses at the Pontifical Urban College for the Propagation of the Faith while residing at the Pontifical North American College, where he was made head prefect of the student body.

== Priesthood ==
On May 30, 1885, Hanna was ordained to the priesthood at the Lateran Basilica by Archbishop Giulio Lenti, vicegerent of the Diocese of Rome. Following his ordination, he continued his studies at the Pontifical Urban College. In July 1886, he performed so well in a theological disputation that Pope Leo XIII granted him a Doctor of Sacred Theology degree without the need for further examination.

Hanna remained in Rome for an additional year, serving as a resident tutor at the Pontifical North American College and an assistant to Francesco Satolli, a theology professor at the Pontifical Urban College and the future Apostolic Delegate to the United States. In 1887, Hanna returned to Rochester and was appointed a professor at St. Andrew's Preparatory Seminary, a minor seminary for young men interested in the priesthood. When Saint Bernard's Seminary opened in 1893, Hanna was made professor of dogmatic theology and remained in that position until 1912.

In addition to his academic responsibilities, Hanna was active in several religious and civic organizations—including the Knights of Columbus, New York Society for the Prevention of Cruelty to Children, and the Rochester chapter of the Archaeological Institute of America.

=== Accusation of Modernism ===
In the summer of 1907, Archbishop Patrick William Riordan submitted a terna, or shortlist of three candidates, for the Vatican to appoint as coadjutor bishop of the Archdiocese of San Francisco. Hanna's name was at the top of the list, followed by Richard Neagle of the Archdiocese of Boston and John Jeremiah Lawler of the Archdiocese of Saint Paul. However, Cardinal Girolamo Maria Gotti, prefect of the Congregation for the Propagation of the Faith (which then oversaw the affairs of the Church in the United States), subsequently received a letter challenging Hanna's orthodoxy. This criticism was based on essays Hanna had written on the human nature of Christ in the New York Review and on absolution in the Catholic Encyclopedia. The letter accused Hanna of Modernism at the same time that Pope Pius X condemned the same in his encyclical Pascendi Dominici gregis.

As opposition to his candidacy grew among the members of the Congregation for the Propagation of the Faith, Hanna was strongly defended by Archbishop Riordan, Bishop McQuaid, and his former professor, Cardinal Francesco Satolli. Riordan and Satolli encouraged him to publish two new essays to demonstrate his orthodoxy and address any skepticism. Meanwhile, reports emerged that the letter to Gotti had come from one of Hanna's colleagues at St. Bernard's Seminary. In January 1908, it was revealed that Andrew Breen, St. Bernard's professor of scripture and Hebrew, wrote the letter after he refused McQuaid's demand for the entire faculty to publicly declare their innocence.

In September 1908, the Congregation for the Propagation of the Faith disqualified Riordan's entire terna, rejecting Hanna's candidacy. Denis J. O'Connell, Hanna's former mentor at the Pontifical North American College, was instead appointed an auxiliary bishop of San Francisco in December 1908; however, he was promoted to Bishop of Richmond three years later, once again leaving Riordan without a successor.

== Episcopal career ==
Following O'Connell's move to Richmond, Riordan renewed his efforts to bring Hanna to San Francisco. By then, tensions over Hanna's accusation of Modernism had subsided and the selection of American bishops was being handled by the Sacred Consistorial Congregation. On October 22, 1912, Hanna was appointed auxiliary bishop of San Francisco and titular bishop of Titiopolis by Pope Pius X. On the following December 4, he received his episcopal consecration in Rochester from Apostolic Delegate Giovanni Bonzano, with Bishop O'Connell and Archbishop James Edward Quigley serving as co-consecrators.

Hanna arrived in San Francisco in late December 1912, and was soon named vicar general of the archdiocese by Riordan. In 1913, Governor Hiram Johnson created the California Commission of Immigration and Housing (CCIH) to improve the living and working conditions of immigrant communities in the state. Hanna was selected as vice president of the five-member body, which also included Simon J. Lubin (president), Paul Scharrenberg (secretary), Mary Simons Gibson, and Arthur H. Fleming. Hanna later became CCIH president in 1923, holding that post until 1935.

=== Archbishop of San Francisco ===
Following Riordan's death in December 1914, Hanna administered the archdiocese until the a new archbishop was selected. On June 1, 1915, he was named the third Archbishop of San Francisco by Pope Benedict XV.

At the beginning of Hanna's tenure in 1915, the archdiocese contained 367 priests and 182 churches to serve a Catholic population of 280,000. By the time of his retirement in 1935, there were 667 priests, 222 churches, and 405,000 Catholics. He was key to the founding of St. Joseph's College in Mountain View, which he considered "the jewel of his accomplishments." He was reportedly under consideration to be made a cardinal in 1923 and 1930.

=== Labor relations ===
Hanna had a long history of serving as a mediator in labor disputes. In 1910, as a priest in Rochester, he was instrumental in reaching an agreement between contractors and striking construction workers, securing an immediate one cent-per-hour wage increase. In 1912, he chaired a committee to investigate sweatshop conditions in Rochester’s clothing industry.

In 1921, while serving as archbishop, Hanna was named chairman of San Francisco’s wage arbitration boards by Mayor James Rolph; he served on the boards through 1924.As governor, Rolph appointed Hanna as chairman of a state mediation board to resolve the 1933 cotton strike in Corcoran. During the 1934 West Coast waterfront strike, President Franklin Roosevelt named Hanna the chairman of the National Longshoremen's Board. The board was tasked with resolving the strike by mediating between the International Longshoremen's Association, the International Seamen's Union, and their employers.

Hanna also served as chairman of the California State Unemployment Commission between 1931 and 1932, during the height of the Great Depression.

=== National Catholic Welfare Council ===
In 1919, Hanna was elected by the bishops of the United States as the first chairman of the National Catholic Welfare Council, a predecessor of the United States Conference of Catholic Bishops, which was renamed the National Catholic Welfare Conference in 1922; he continued as chairman through his retirement in 1935. As chairman, he was responsible for coordinating the American bishops' lobbying efforts and response to the domestic and foreign policies of the government.

== Retirement and death ==
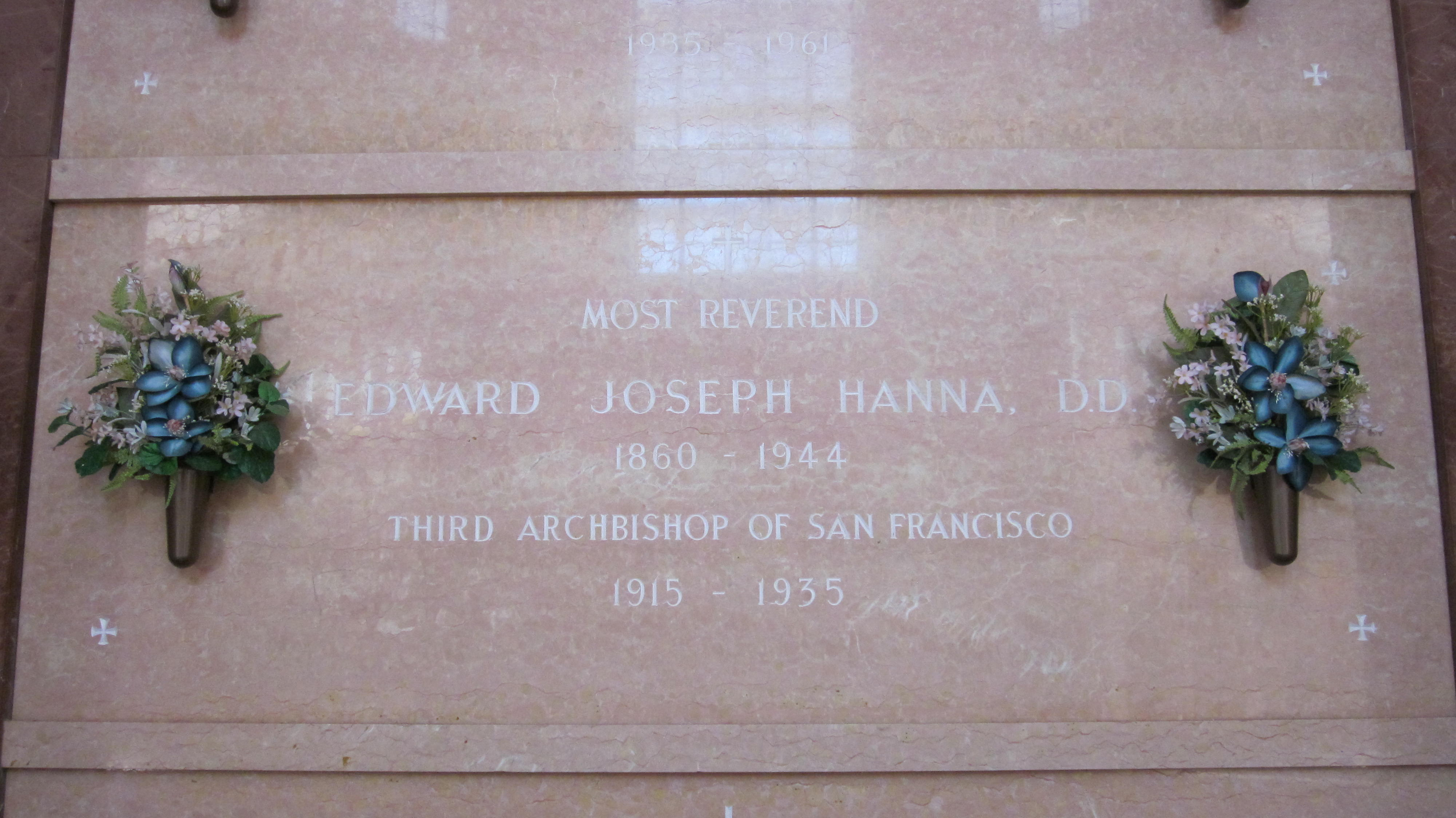
Hanna's vault at Holy Cross

Archbishop Hanna retired March 2, 1935, due to ill health and advancing age. Pope Pius XI appointed Hanna the titular archbishop of Gortyna. He was succeeded as archbishop of San Francisco by John Joseph Mitty. Hanna moved to Rome after his retirement, where he died on July 10, 1944. Hanna's body was returned to San Francisco in 1947. He is buried in the Archbishop's Crypt at Holy Cross Cemetery in Colma, California.

Archbishop Hanna High School, part of the Hanna Boys Center in Sonoma, California, since 1945, is a residential treatment center for at-risk boys.

== Sources ==
- McNamara, Robert F. (1963). "Archbishop Hanna, Rochesterian" (PDF). Rochester History.
- Gribble, Richard (2006). An Archbishop for the People: The Life of Edward J. Hanna. Paulist Press. ISBN 0809144050.
- Gaffey, James P. (1976). Citizen of No Mean City: Archbishop Patrick W. Riordan of San Francisco (1841-1914). Wilmington, Delaware: Consortium Books. ISBN 0-8434-0628-3.

Catholic Church titles
Preceded by Patrick William Riordan	Archbishop of San Francisco; 1915–1935	Succeeded by John Joseph Mitty
