= Hanna Academy =

Private high school in Sonoma, California

Location
- 17000 Arnold Drive; Sonoma, (Sonoma County), California 95476; United States; 38°19′15″N 122°30′19″W

Information
- Type: Private, IEP education
- Established: 1949
- Principal: Courtney Jackson
- Grades: 9-12
- Average class size: 8-10
- Colors: Green and gold
- Mascot: Hawk
- Team name: Hawks
- Accreditation: Western Association of Schools and Colleges
- Website: https://hannaacademy.org

Hanna Academy is a nonpublic, co-ed high school in Sonoma, California, United States. It serves students with Individual Education Plans (IEPs), primarily those with behavioral and emotional challenges. The school offers both traditional academic instruction in addition to life skills education and a residential program for students.

== Background ==
Hanna Academy is a non-public, non-denominational, coeducational high school in Sonoma County that has served students since 2023. The school focuses on trauma-informed care and equipping students with life skills in addition to traditional academics. Previously, the school was part of the Hanna Boys Center, a residential treatment center for troubled youth.

== Archbishop Hanna High School for Boys ==
The school was originally called Archbishop Hanna High School for Boys, and was established in 1948. It started accepting girls in 2023.
