= Myron J. Cotta =

American Catholic prelate (born 1953)

His Excellency, The Most Reverend Myron Joseph Cotta
- Bishop of Stockton
- Diocese: Stockton
- Appointed: January 23, 2018
- Installed: March 15, 2018
- Predecessor: Stephen Blaire
- Previous post: Auxiliary Bishop of Sacramento and Titular Bishop of Muteci (2014-2018)

Orders
- Ordination: September 12, 1987 by José de Jesús Madera Uribe
- Consecration: March 25, 2014 by Jaime Soto, Armando Xavier Ochoa, and José de Jesús Madera Uribe

Personal details
- Born: March 21, 1953 (age 73) Dos Palos, California, US
- Education: West Hills College Coalinga; St. John's Seminary
- Motto: Graça misericórdia (Grace and mercy)

Styles of Myron Joseph Cotta
- Reference style: His Excellency; The Most Reverend
- Spoken style: Your Excellency
- Religious style: Bishop

Myron Joseph Cotta (born March 21, 1953) is an American prelate of the Roman Catholic Church. He was appointed as the sixth bishop of the Diocese of Stockton in California by Pope Francis on January 23, 2018. His installation mass was celebrated on March 15, 2018, at St. Stanislaus Catholic Church in Modesto, California. Cotta previously served as an auxiliary bishop of the Diocese of Sacramento in California from 2014 to 2018.

== Biography ==
=== Early life ===
Myron Cotta was born on March 21, 1953, in Dos Palos, California, to Daniel and Mary Cotta. Growing up on a dairy farm, he attended Dos Palos High School. He received an associates degree from West Hills College Coalinga in Coalinga, California.

Deciding to become a priest, Cotta entered St. John's Seminary in Camarillo, California, in 1980. He received a bachelor's degree and a Master of Divinity degree in 1987.

=== Priesthood ===
Cotta was ordained a priest at St. Anthony Church in Fresno by Bishop José de Jesús Madera Uribe for the Diocese of Fresno on September 12, 1987. The diocese assigned Cotta to the following pastoral assignments in California parishes:

- Parochial vicar at St. Anthony in Atwater (1987 to 1989)
- Administrator of Our Lady of Fatima Shrine in Laton (1989 to 1992)
- Pastor of Our Lady of Miracles Parish in Gustine (1992 to 1999)

Following his pastoral assignments, Cotta served as the vicar general and moderator of the curia for the diocese. Pope John Paul II named Cotta a chaplain of his holiness, with the title of monsignor, in 2002. Pope Benedict XVI named him a prelate of honor in 2009.

After the 2010 death of John Steinbock, the bishop of Fresno, the Vatican named Cotta as administrator of the diocese. He served this role until the consecration of Bishop Armando Ochoa in 2011.

=== Auxiliary Bishop of Sacramento ===
Coat of Arms as Auxiliary Bishop of Sacramento

Pope Francis appointed Cotta as an auxiliary bishop of Sacramento on January 24, 2014. He was also named titular bishop of Muteci. He was consecrated in the Cathedral of the Blessed Sacrament in Sacramento on March 25, 2014, by Bishop Jaime Soto. Bishops Armando Ochoa and José de Jesús Madera Uribe acted as the principal co-consecrators.

=== Bishop of Stockton ===
On January 23, 2018, Francis named Cotta as bishop of Stockton. He was installed on March 15, 2018. Archbishop Salvatore Cordileone and Archbishop Christophe Pierre attended the installation mass.

Cotta is fluent in English, Spanish and Portuguese.

== See also ==
- Catholic Church hierarchy
- Catholic Church in the United States
- Historical list of the Catholic bishops of the United States
- List of Catholic bishops of the United States
- Lists of patriarchs, archbishops, and bishops

== Episcopal succession ==
Catholic Church titles
Preceded by Stephen Blaire	Bishop of Stockton; 2018-Present	Succeeded by Incumbent
