= James Francis McIntyre =

American prelate

His Eminence James Francis McIntyre
- Cardinal, Archbishop emeritus of Los Angeles
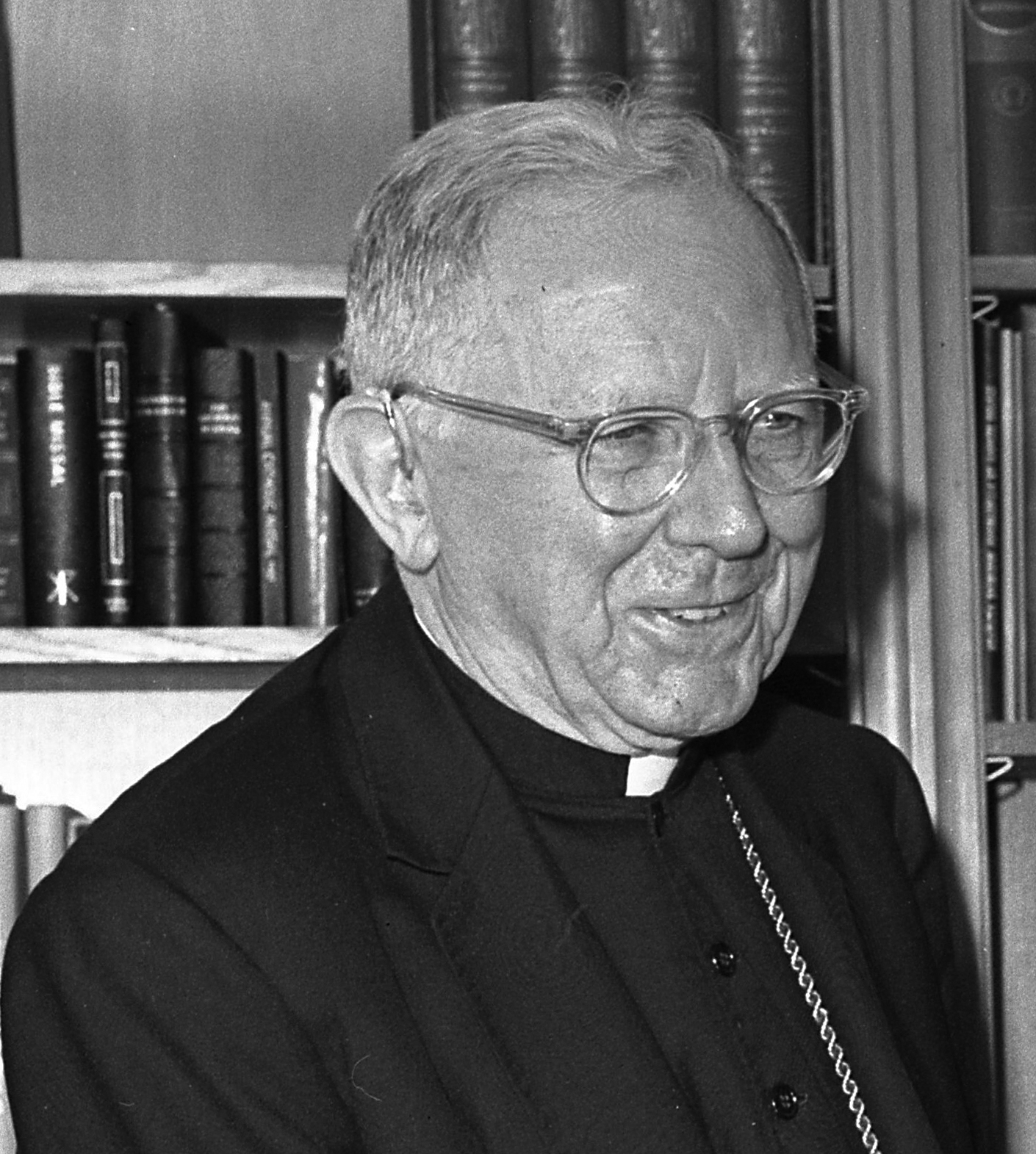
- McIntyre in 1970
- See: Los Angeles
- Appointed: February 7, 1948
- Installed: March 19, 1948
- Term ended: January 21, 1970
- Predecessor: John Joseph Cantwell
- Successor: Timothy Manning
- Other post: Cardinal Priest of Santa Anastasia
- Previous posts: Coadjutor Archbishop of New York (1946–1948); Auxiliary Bishop of New York (1940–1946)

Orders
- Ordination: May 21, 1921 by Patrick Joseph Hayes
- Consecration: January 8, 1941 by Francis Spellman
- Created cardinal: January 12, 1953 by Pius XII

Personal details
- Born: June 25, 1886 New York, New York, US
- Died: July 16, 1979 (aged 93) Los Angeles, California, US
- Buried: Cathedral of Our Lady of the Angels, Los Angeles, California
- Motto: Miserere mei Deus (God, have mercy on me)

Styles of James McIntyre
- Reference style: His Eminence
- Spoken style: Your Eminence
- Religious style: Cardinal
- Informal style: Cardinal
- See: Los Angeles

Ordination history of James Francis McIntyre
History
Episcopal consecration
- Consecrated by: Francis Spellman
- Date: January 8, 1941
Episcopal succession
Bishops consecrated by James Francis McIntyre as principal consecrator
- Walter Philip Kellenberg: October 5, 1953
- Edward Vincent Dargin: October 5, 1953
- Alden John Bell: June 4, 1956
- John James Ward: December 12, 1963

James Francis Aloysius McIntyre (June 25, 1886 – July 16, 1979) was an American prelate of the Catholic Church. He served as archbishop of Los Angeles in California from 1948 to 1970, and was created a cardinal in 1953. He previously served as an auxiliary bishop of the Archdiocese of New York from 1940 to 1948.

He was a highly successful builder of new parishes, churches, and schools. He was notable in church politics, and his reputation remains highly controversial.

== Early life ==
James McIntyre was born on June 25, 1886, in Manhattan to James and Mary (née Pelly) McIntyre. His father was a native of New York City and member of the mounted police, and his mother was from Kiltormer, County Galway, Ireland. McIntyre attended Public School No. 70 because there was no room for him at the local parochial school.

His father became totally disabled after falling from his horse in Central Park in Manhattan; his mother then opened a dressmaking business to support the family. Following his mother's death in 1896, McIntyre and his father were taken into the nearby home of a relative. He did not attend high school, instead becoming an errand boy in the financial market. He attended night school at Columbia University and City College, both in Manhattan.

At age 16, McIntyre became a runner on the New York Stock Exchange, working for the brokerage firm of H.L. Horton & Co. He was offered a junior partnership at Horton in 1914, but declined it in order to enter the priesthood. He then studied at Cathedral College in Queens for a year before entering St. Joseph's Seminary in Yonkers, New York, where he was a friend of future Cardinal Patrick O'Boyle.

== Priesthood ==
McIntyre was ordained to the priesthood by Archbishop Patrick Hayes for the Archdiocese of New York on May 21, 1921, at St. Patrick's Cathedral in Manhattan. After his ordination, the archdiocese assigned him assistant pastor of St. Gabriel's Parish on the Lower East Side of Manhattan. In 1923, he was named assistant chancellor for the archdiocese. He was promoted to chancellor in 1934, and named privy chamberlain by Pope Pius XI on December 27, 1933. Pius XI elevated him to the status of a domestic prelate on November 12, 1936.

Following the appointment of Auxiliary Bishop Francis Spellman to archbishop of New York in 1939, McIntyre was named to the archdiocesan board of consultors. In 1939, he formed the Columbiettes, a Knights of Columbus women's auxiliary.

== Episcopate ==
=== Auxiliary Bishop of New York ===
On November 16, 1940, McIntyre was appointed auxiliary bishop of New York and titular bishop of Cyrene by Pope Pius XII. He received his episcopal consecration on January 8, 1941, from Spellman, with Auxiliary Bishops Stephen Donahue and John O'Hara serving as co-consecrators, in St. Patrick's Cathedral. Spellman appointed McIntyre as vicar general of the archdiocese on January 27, 1945; he received the Grand Cross of the Order of the Holy Sepulchre in May 1946.

On July 20, 1946, McIntyre was named coadjutor bishop of New York and titular archbishop of Paltus. Despite never succeeding Spellman as archbishop, he assisted in the governance of the archdiocese while Spellman was busied by his additional duties as Apostolic Vicar for the Military Forces. Spellman once said,

"I have never undertaken any important matter without consulting [McIntyre]. In nothing have I gone contrary to his advice."

In 1947, McIntyre spoke out against legislation that would "permit further encroachments on the parental function of education."

=== Archbishop of Los Angeles ===
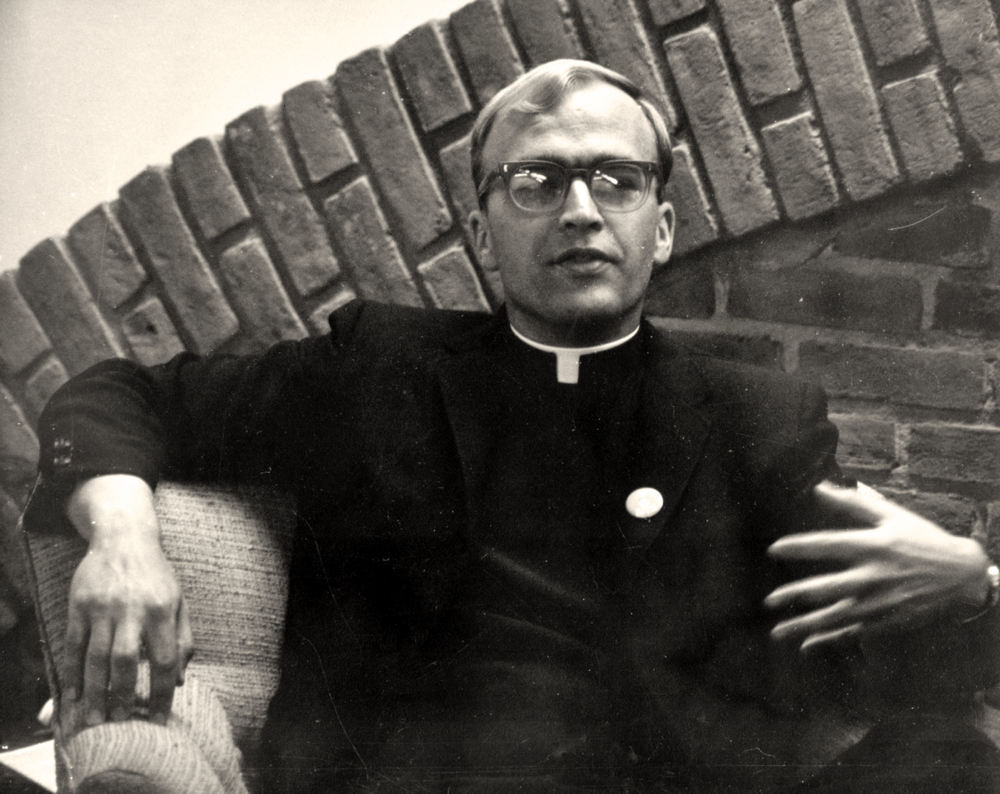
William DuBay (1968)

McIntyre was appointed the second archbishop of Los Angeles on February 7, 1948, by Pius XII. McIntyre was installed as archbishop at St. Vibiana's Cathedral in Los Angeles on March 19, 1948. In McIntyre's first four years, the archdiocese established 26 new parishes, 64 new parochial schools, and 18 new high schools . At one point during his tenure, he oversaw the construction of a new church every 66 days and a new school every 26 days to accommodate the post-World War II population boom in Southern California. As archbishop, he led the successful effort to repeal the state tax on Catholic schools.

Pius XII created McIntyre Cardinal-Priest of the Basilica of Sant'Anastasia al Palatino in Rome during the consistory of January 12, 1953. At that time, McIntyre became the first cardinal of the Western United States. At the consistory, the photographer's flash bulb failed to go off when the biretta was conferred on McIntyre. He and Pius then re-enacted the ceremony for the picture. McIntyre participated in the 1958 papal conclave that elected Pope John XXIII and again in the 1963 papal conclave that elected Pope Paul VI.

Always referred to in the press as James Francis Cardinal McIntyre, in 1966 he suspended the Reverend William DuBay from his ministerial duties. DuBay, an advocate for unionizing priests, had threatened to sue McIntyre if he tried to block the creation of such a union in the archdiocese. DuBay in 1964 had accused McIntyre of failing to support the Civil Rights Movement for African-Americans. After DuBay published a book calling for a union, McIntyre assigned him to a different parish and demoted him to assistant pastor. DuBay never returned to ministry; he married in 1968.

In 1967, McIntyre banned members of the Sisters of the Immaculate Heart of Mary from teaching in schools in the archdiocese. The nuns had recently abandoned some traditional elements of cloister life, such as compulsory daily prayer and the wearing of habits in the classroom. In 1968, the Sacred Congregation of Religious in Rome ruled that the nuns had to restore their former practices or request dispensation from their vows. Of the 380 members of the order, 315 chose to leave.

According to The New York Times, by the end of his tenure, McIntyre was the subject of protests by Blacks, Hispanics, and his own clergy. As the result of rule changes by Pope Paul VI, on January 1, 1971, he lost the right to participate in a Papal conclave due to being over the age of 80.

=== Retirement and legacy ===
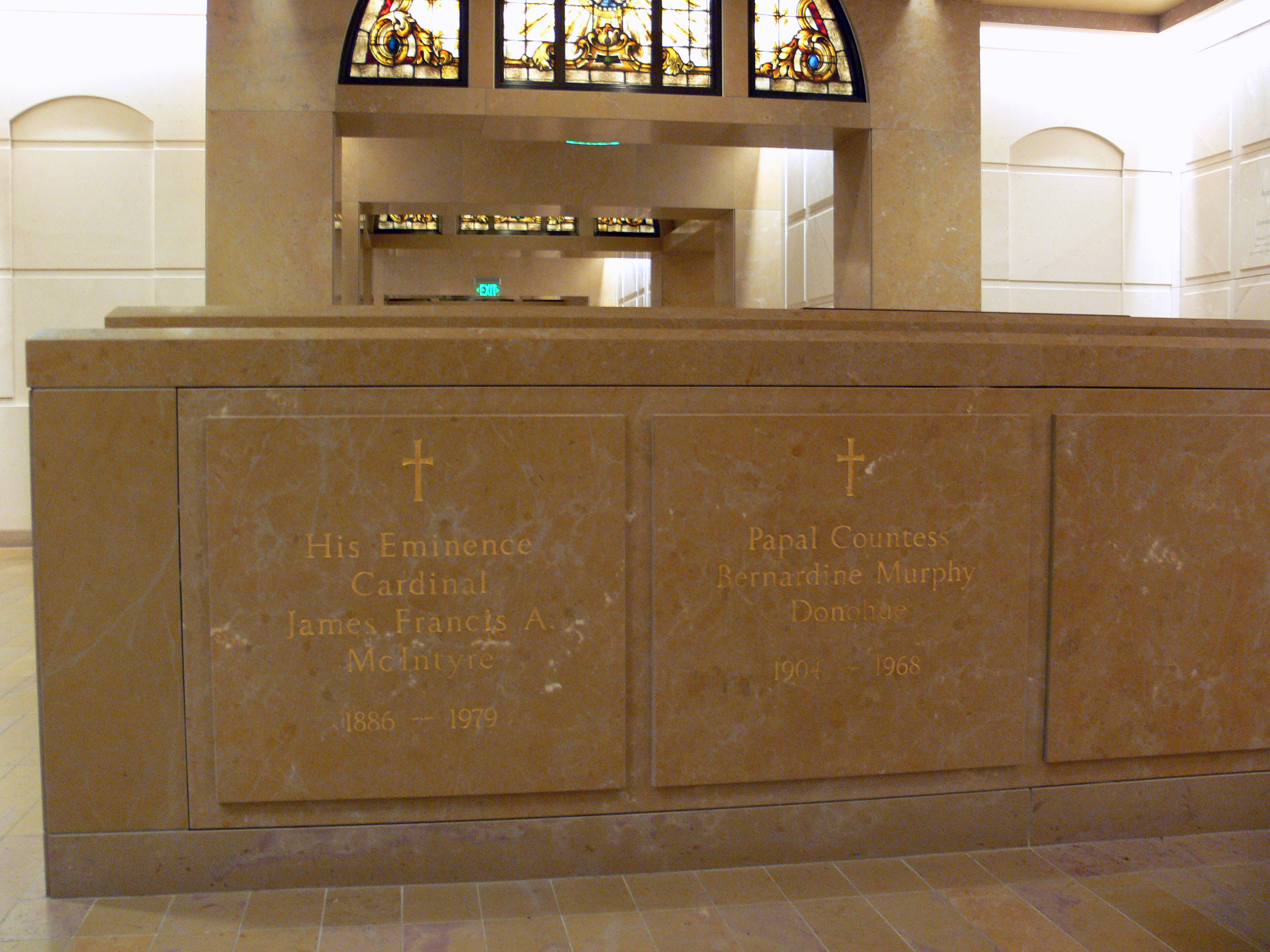
The tomb of Cardinal McIntyre in the crypt of the Cathedral of Our Lady of the Angels, Los Angeles (2008)

McIntyre retired after 21 years as archbishop of Los Angeles on January 21, 1970. He then served as a priest at St. Basil's Parish in midtown Los Angeles, where he privately celebrated the Tridentine Mass on the side altars of St. Basil's.

McIntyre died at St. Vincent Medical Center in Los Angeles, at the age of 93. In 2003, his remains were transferred to the crypt of the new Cathedral of Our Lady of the Angels.

== Reputation ==
John Cooney writes in his 1984 book The American Pope that McIntyre harbored racial prejudices and was approached privately by the priests of his archdiocese who asked him to refrain from making racial slurs.

Charles Morris in his 1997 book American Catholic states:

Today, McIntyre's name is associated mostly with his sad, slightly ridiculous octogenarian flailing against the cultural and religious revolutions of the 1960s. But if he had retired at the canonical age of 75 in 1961...he would be remembered as one of the great builders of the American Church.

Monsignor Francis Weber, in his two-volume biography of McIntyre, tries to rehabilitate the cardinal's reputation. In a 1997 review of Weber's book, historian Kevin Starr agrees with Weber and articulates the alternative version of McIntyre and the 1960s. Starr writes:

Sadly, this kindly (most of the time) and, in his own way, holy prelate became the scapegoat for those pushing the ecclesial revolutions, so frequently self-destructive, of the 1960s after the Second Vatican Council.

== Viewpoints ==
=== Abortion ===
In 1967, McIntyre lobbied California Governor Ronald Reagan regarding a proposed law to legalize abortion in that state under certain conditions. He convinced Reagan to veto the law if it allowed abortions in case of birth defects. The California State Legislature dropped that provision from the bill and Reagan signed the law, which decriminalized abortions when done to protect the health of the mother.

=== Anti-Semitism ===
In 1944, while auxiliary bishop, McIntyre said that accounts of anti-Semitism in New York were "a manufactured movement...for the deliberate purpose of besmirching the minority Catholic population."

=== Church reform ===
McIntyre opposed the liturgical revisions following the Second Vatican Council, held between 1962 and 1965. Along with Francis Cardinal Spellman in New York and other traditionally-minded bishops in the United States, the final Tridentine Mass was celebrated officially throughout the Los Angeles archdiocese on November 22, 1970, as the 24th and Last Sunday After Pentecost. The Mass of Paul VI was not celebrated officially in Los Angeles until canon law required it on November 29, the First Sunday of Advent that year.

When Bishop James P. Shannon expressed views critical of the Church hierarchy in an NBC documentary in the late 1960s, McIntyre described Shannon's views as constituting "incipient schism."

=== Communism ===
McIntyre sent his priests to meetings of the John Birch Society, a right wing group of the 1950s, to supposedly educate themselves about communism. He also recommended subscriptions to American Opinion and other Birch publications in his diocesan newspaper.

=== Media ===
By 1955, filmmakers in the United States were ignoring some of the restrictions in the Hollywood Production Code. which engendered criticism from the Catholic Legion of Decency. In a statement to the pastors in the archdiocese, McIntyre warned them about "an obvious trend toward laxity" in films.

Catholic Church titles
Preceded by Michael von Faulhaber	Cardinal Priest of Santa Anastasia; 1953–1979	Succeeded by Godfried Danneels
Preceded by John Joseph Cantwell	Archbishop of Los Angeles; 1948–1970	Succeeded by Timothy Manning
Preceded by –	Coadjutor Archbishop of New York; 1946–1948	Succeeded by –
Preceded by –	Auxiliary Bishop of New York; 1940–1946	Succeeded by –
