= List of churches in the Diocese of San Diego =

This is a list of current and former Roman Catholic churches in the Roman Catholic Diocese of San Diego. The diocese comprises Imperial and San Diego counties in Southern California and has more than 100 churches. The cathedral of the diocese is St. Joseph Cathedral in the Cortez Hill neighborhood of downtown San Diego.

== Imperial County ==
Name	Image	Location	Description/notes
Our Lady of Guadalupe		124 East 5th Street, Calexico	
Our Lady of Guadalupe		153 East Brighton Ave, El Centro	
Sacred Heart		402 South Imperial Ave, Brawley	
St. Anthony of Padua		211 West 6th Street, Imperial	
St. Joseph		300 N Ctr, Westmorland	
St. Joseph		560 Maple Avenue, Holtville	
St. Margaret Mary		620 South Cesar Chavez Street, Brawley	
St. Mary		795 La Brucherie Rd, El Centro	
St. Patrick		133 East Church St, Calipatria	
St. Thomas Indian Mission Church		350 Picacho Rd., Fort Yuma	

== San Diego County ==
=== City of San Diego ===
Name	Image	Location	Description/notes
Ascension		11292 Clairemont Mesa Blvd, San Diego	Established 1980
Blessed Sacrament		4540 El Cerrito Dr, San Diego	
Christ the King		29 32nd St, San Diego	
Holy Angels (Byzantine - Ruthenian)		2235 Galahad Rd, San Diego	Established 1958
Holy Family		1957 Coolidge St, San Diego	Established 1942
Holy Spirit		2725 55th St, San Diego	Established 1952
The Immaculata		5998 Alcala Park, San Diego	
Immaculate Conception		2540 San Diego Ave, San Diego	Established 1849
Good Shepherd		8200 Gold Coast Dr, San Diego	
Mission of San Diego de Alcala		10818 San Diego Mission Rd, San Diego	
Our Lady of Angels		656 24th St, San Diego	
Our Lady of Guadalupe		1770 Kearny Ave, San Diego	
Our Lady of Mount Carmel		13541 Stoney Creek Rd, San Diego	
Our Lady of Refuge		4226 Jewell St, San Diego	
Our Lady of the Rosary		1668 State St, San Diego	
Our Lady of the Sacred Heart		4177 Marlborough Ave, San Diego	
Sacred Heart		4776 Saratoga Ave, San Diego	
St. Agnes		1140 Evergreen St, San Diego	
St. Anne		2337 Irving Ave, San Diego	
St. Brigid		4735 Cass St, San Diego	
St. Catherine Laboure		4124 Mt. Abraham Ave, San Diego	
St. Charles		990 Saturn Blvd, San Diego	
St. Charles Borromeo		2802 Cadiz St, San Diego	
St. Columba		3327 Glencolum Dr, San Diego	
St. Didacus		4772 Felton St, San Diego	
St. Gregory the Great		11451 Blue Cypress Dr, San Diego	
St. Jacob Mission (Melkite)		San Diego	
St. John the Evangelist		1638 Polk Ave, San Diego	
St. Joseph Cathedral		1535 3rd Ave, San Diego	
St. Jude Shrine of the West		1129 South 38th St, San Diego	
St. Mary Magdalen		1945 Illion St, San Diego	
St. Maximillian Kolbe Mission		1735 Grand Ave, San Diego	
St. Patrick		3585 30th St, San Diego	
St. Rita		5124 Churchward St, San Diego	
St. Therese		6400 St Therese Way, San Diego	
St. Vincent de Paul		Ibis St, San Diego	
San Rafael		17252 Bernardo Center Dr, San Diego	

=== East County ===
Name	Image	Location	Description/notes
Guardian Angels		9310 Dalehurst Road, Santee	
Holy Trinity		405 Ballard St, El Cajon	Established 1903
Immaculate Heart of Mary		537 E St, Ramona	
Our Lady of Grace		2766 Navajo Rd, El Cajon	
Our Lady of Light		9136 Riverside Dr, Descanso	
Our Lady of Perpetual Help		13208 Lakeshore Dr, Lakeside	
Our Mother of Confidence		3131 Governor Dr, San Diego	
Our Mother of Perpetual Help Mission (Syriac)		1101 South Mollison Ave, El Cajon	
Queen of Angels		2569 Victoria Dr, Alpine	
St. Adelaide of Burgundy		1347 Dewey Place, Campo	
St. Elizabeth of Hungary		2814 B St, Julian	
St. Ephrem Mission (Maronite)		750 Medford St, El Cajon	
St. John the Baptizer (Ukrainian)		4400 Palm Ave, La Mesa	
St. John of the Cross		8086 Broadway, Lemon Grove	
St. Kateri Tekakwitha		1054 Barona Rd, Lakeside	
St. Kieran		1510 Greenfield Dr, El Cajon	
St. Louise de Marillac		2005 Crest Dr, El Cajon	
St. Luke		1980 Hillsdale Rd, El Cajon	
St. Martin of Tours		7710 El Cajon Blvd, La Mesa	
St. Michael (Chaldean)		799 East Washington Ave, El Cajon	
St. Peter (Chaldean)		1627 Jamacha Rd, El Cajon	
St. Pius X		14107 Lyons Valley Rd, Jamul	
St. Richard		611 Church Lane, Borrego Springs	
Santa Ysabel Indian Mission		23013 Hwy. 79, Santa Ysabel	
Santa Sophia		9800 San Juan St, Spring Valley	

=== North County ===
Name	Image	Location	Description/Notes
All Hallows		6602 La Jolla Scenic Dr South, La Jolla	
Mary, Star of the Sea		7669 Girard Ave, La Jolla	
Mission San Antonio de Pala		Pala Mission Rd, Pala	
Mission San Luis Rey de Francia		4070 Mission Ave, Oceanside	
Nativity		6309 El Apajo Road, Rancho Santa Fe	
Resurrection		1445 Conway Dr, Escondido	
St. Elizabeth Seton		6628 Santa Isabel St, Carlsbad	
St. Francis of Assisi		525 West Vista Way, Vista	
St. Gabriel		13734 Twin Peaks Rd, Poway	
St. James		625 South Nardo Ave, Solana Beach	
St. John the Evangelist		1001 Encinitas Blvd, Encinitas	
St. Joseph Mission (Syriac)		Oceanside	
St. Mark		1147 Discovery St, San Marcos	
St. Margaret		4300 Oceanside Blvd, Oceanside	
St. Mary		1170 S. Broadway, Escondido	
St. Mary Star of the Sea		609 Pier View Way, Oceanside	
St. Michael		15546 Pomerado Rd, Poway	
St. Patrick		3821 Adams St, Carlsbad	
St. Peter the Apostle		450 South Stage Coach Lane, Fallbrook	
St. Stephen		31020 Cole Grade Rd, Valley Center	
St. Therese of Carmel		Del Mar Trails Rd, San Diego	
St. Thomas More		1450 South Melrose Dr, Oceanside	
St. Timothy		2960 Canyon Road, Escondido	
Virgin Mary Community Melkite Mission		Temecula	

=== South County ===
Name	Image	Location	Description/notes
Corpus Christi		450 Corral Canyon Rd, Bonita	Established 1984
Mater Dei		1571 Magdalena Ave, Chula Vista	Established 2004
Most Precious Blood		1245 4th Ave, Chula Vista	
Our Lady of Guadalupe		345 Anita St, Chula Vista	
Our Lady of Mount Carmel		2020 Alaquinas Dr, San Ysidro	
Sacred Heart		655 C Ave, Coronado	
St. Anthony of Padua		410 West 18th St, National City	
St. Charles		990 Saturn Blvd, San Diego	
St. Mary		426 East 7th St, National City	
St. Michael		2643 Homedale St, San Diego	
St. Pius X		1120 Cuyamaca Ave, Chula Vista	
St. Rose of Lima		293 H St, Chula Vista	
