= Michael Pham =

Vietnamese American Catholic prelate (born 1967)

His Excellency, The Most Reverend Michael Pham
- Bishop of San Diego
- Pham in 2023
- Native name: Micae Phạm Minh Cường
- Diocese: San Diego
- Appointed: May 22, 2025
- Installed: July 17, 2025
- Predecessor: Robert W. McElroy
- Previous post: Auxiliary Bishop of San Diego & Titular Bishop of Cercina (2023–2025)

Orders
- Ordination: June 25, 1999 by Robert Brom
- Consecration: September 28, 2023 by Robert W. McElroy, Joseph J. Tyson, and John P. Dolan

Personal details
- Born: Phạm Minh Cường; January 27, 1967 (age 59) Da Nang, Republic of Vietnam
- Education: San Diego State University; Saint Patrick's Seminary
- Motto: United in Christ; (Hiệp nhất trong Chúa Kitô)
- Styles
- Reference style: His Excellency; The Most Reverend
- Spoken style: Your Excellency
- Religious style: Bishop

Michael Cuong Minh Pham (born January 27, 1967) is a Vietnamese American Catholic prelate serving as Bishop of San Diego since 2025. From 2023 to 2025, he served as an auxiliary bishop of the diocese.

== Early life ==
The oldest son in his family, Phạm Minh Cường, was born on January 27, 1967, in Da Nang in what was then South Vietnam. Pham's father, who served in the South Vietnamese military, was considered an "enemy of the state" by the government after the fall of Saigon, and as a result, his properties were confiscated, and he was put in a re-education camp. He was eventually released and became a fisherman.

At ten years old, Pham was initially inspired to become a priest after seeing a local priest who was very involved with parishioners and was kind to everyone.

== Emigration and education ==
In July 1980, when Pham was 13, he, his older sister, and younger brother fled Vietnam by boat with very little food, water, or personal belongings. The boat had 119 occupants, but was designed for half the number on board, and was raided by pirates. Pham later recounted the conditions, stating that "We were jammed in like sardines. There was barely room to sit down," and that he got very seasick during the journey.

Eventually, their boat was picked up by another boat and brought to Bidong refugee camp in Malaysia, Pham and his siblings stayed there for three months before being fast-tracked for admission to the United States because they were minors. The siblings were brought to Seattle via Japan, where the three were brought in by a host family from Blue Earth, Minnesota, by 1981. Eventually, his 12-year-old sister made the journey by herself and joined them, with the rest of the family following suit over the next two years. Pham's father took a trip to San Diego and decided to relocate the family there a month later in 1985.

Initially starting high school in Minnesota, Pham graduated from San Diego High School and then entered San Diego State University. He graduated with a Bachelor of Science degree in aeronautical engineering. While working on his master's degree at San Diego State, Pham decided to enter the priesthood. He attended Saint Patrick's Seminary in Menlo Park, where he earned a Systematic Theology Baccalaureate and a Master of Divinity degree. He later recalled while presiding at Mass during the Marian Days pilgrimage in Carthage, Missouri, that while attending the annual event in 1992, he prayed before the image of Our Lady of Perpetual Help in the chapel, and that this moment confirmed his vocation.

== Priesthood ==
On June 25, 1999, Pham was ordained to the priesthood for the Diocese of San Diego by Bishop Robert Henry Brom at Saint Michael Church in Poway. His first assignment was as parochial vicar at St. Mary, Star of the Sea Parish in Oceanside. He left St. Mary in 2001 to become the diocesan vocation director. In 2004, he was installed as pastor at Holy Family parish in San Diego and served there for the next ten years.

In 2014, Pham was transferred to St. Therese Parish in San Diego to serve as pastor there. After two years, he was moved to Good Shepherd Parish in San Diego. In 2017, Bishop Robert McElroy named Pham as episcopal vicar for ethnic and intercultural communities and in 2018 as vicar general. He completed a Licentiate of Sacred Theology at St. Patrick's Seminary in 2020.

== Auxiliary Bishop of San Diego ==
Coat of arms as auxiliary bishop of San Diego

Pope Francis appointed Pham as an auxiliary bishop of San Diego on June 6, 2023. On September 28, 2023, Pham was consecrated as a bishop with Felipe Pulido at St. Therese of Carmel Church in San Diego by McElroy, with bishops Joseph J. Tyson, and John P. Dolan serving as co-consecrators. As auxiliary bishop, Pham served as the vicar for clergy.

After Cardinal McElroy was appointed as Archbishop of Washington on January 6, 2025, he served as administrator until March 11, when he was installed in Washington. Pham was subsequently elected diocesan administrator on March 17.

On his coat of arms is a beehive, which represents Saint John Chrysostom, his baptismal patron saint.

== Bishop of San Diego ==
On May 22, 2025, Pham was named Bishop of San Diego and was installed as bishop on July 17, 2025. He was Pope Leo XIV's first episcopal appointment for the United States. Furthermore, Pham is the fourth Vietnamese American bishop overall, and the first to head a diocese.

In June 2025, Pham authored a joint letter with his auxiliary bishops Ramón Bejarano and Pulido announcing that a group of clergy and faith leaders would block the detaining of immigrants at the Edward J. Schwartz Federal Building and U.S. Courthouse in San Diego on June 20th, World Refugee Day. On that day, Pham led a dozen religious leaders who stopped United States Immigration and Customs Enforcement (ICE) and United States Border Patrol (CBP) agents from detaining immigrants.

== Episcopal succession ==
Catholic Church titles
Preceded by Robert McElroy	Bishop of San Diego; 2025–present	Succeeded by Incumbent
Preceded by -	Auxiliary Bishop of San Diego; 2023–2025	Succeeded by -
