= John P. Dolan =

American Catholic prelate (born 1962)

His Excellency, The Most Reverend John P. Dolan
- Bishop of Phoenix
- Diocese: Phoenix
- Appointed: June 10, 2022
- Installed: August 2, 2022
- Predecessor: Thomas Olmsted
- Previous post: Auxiliary Bishop of San Diego and Titular Bishop of Uchi Maius (2017-2022)

Orders
- Ordination: July 1, 1989 by Leo Thomas Maher
- Consecration: June 8, 2017 by Robert McElroy, Robert Brom, and Richard John Garcia

Personal details
- Born: June 8, 1962 (age 64) San Diego, California, US
- Education: University of San Diego; Saint Patrick's Seminary and University
- Motto: Abide in my love
- Styles
- Reference style: His Excellency; The Most Reverend
- Spoken style: Your Excellency
- Religious style: Bishop

John Patrick Dolan (born June 8, 1962) is an American Catholic prelate serving as Bishop of Phoenix since 2022. He previously served as an auxiliary bishop for the Diocese of San Diego from 2017 to 2022.

== Biography ==
=== Early life ===
Dolan was born on June 8, 1962, in San Diego, California, to Catherine and Gerald Dolan, the seventh of nine children. Dolan attended the School of the Madeleine in San Diego and University of San Diego High School. After graduating from high school in 1981, Dolan decided to become a priest. He enrolled in St. Francis Seminary, a house of formation on the University of San Diego (USD) campus.

After receiving a bachelor's degree in philosophy from St. Francis in 1985, Dolan entered Saint Patrick's Seminary and University in Menlo Park. He obtained his Master of Divinity and Master of Theology degrees from Saint Patrick's in 1989.

=== Priesthood ===
On July 1, 1989, Dolan was ordained a priest at San Rafael Church in Rancho Bernardo, for the Diocese of San Diego by Bishop Leo Thomas Maher. The diocese assigned Dolan as an associate pastor at St. Michael’s Parish in San Diego. He was transferred in 1991 to Santa Sophia Parish in Spring Valley, to serve as associate pastor there. He was named director of vocations for the diocese in 1992.

Dolan was appointed pastor at St. Mary Star of the Sea Parish in Oceanside, in 1996. He left St. Mary in 2001 to serve as pastor for one year at St. Michael's Parish in San Diego. In 2002, Dolan became pastor of St. Rose of Lima Parish in Chula Vista. After 12 years at St. Rose, Dolan was transferred in 2014 to be pastor at Saint Michael's Parish in Poway. Bishop Robert W. McElroy named Dolan as episcopal vicar for the clergy in 2016.

=== Auxiliary Bishop of San Diego ===
Coat of arms as auxiliary bishop of San Diego

On April 19, 2017, Pope Francis appointed Dolan as an auxiliary bishop of San Diego and titular bishop of Uchi Maius. On June 8, 2017, he was consecrated a bishop by Bishop Robert W. McElroy at St. Thérèse of Carmel Church in Del Mar, with Bishops Robert Brom and Richard Garcia acting as co-consecrators.

As auxiliary bishop, Dolan continued to serve as vicar for clergy and was named moderator of the curia in 2017.

=== Bishop of Phoenix ===
On June 10, 2022, Francis appointed Dolan as bishop of Phoenix. Dolan was installed on August 2, 2022.

Within the United States Conference of Catholic Bishops (USCCB), Dolan is a member of the Catholic Campaign for Human Development and the Sub-Committee for African Relations.

Dolan has lost three siblings and a brother-in-law to suicide. In 2022, he established an office for the Mental Health Ministry in the diocese. In 2023, Dolan spent 12 days in Ethiopia, Uganda and Kenya, visiting charitable projects that received USCCB financial support.

Dolan serves as chaplain to the National Association of Catholic Mental Health Ministers and is the co-editor of two books written by the association on suicide:

- Responding to Suicide (2020)
- When a Loved One Dies by Suicide (2020)

== See also ==
- Catholic Church hierarchy
- Catholic Church in the United States
- Historical list of the Catholic bishops of the United States
- List of Catholic bishops of the United States
- Lists of patriarchs, archbishops, and bishops

Catholic Church titles
| Preceded by | Auxiliary Bishop of San Diego; 2017–2022 | Succeeded by |
| Preceded by Thomas Olmsted | Bishop of Phoenix; 2022–present | Succeeded by Incumbent |
