= Cirilo Flores =

The name Cirilo Flores can refer to:

- Cirilo B. Flores, a 20th-21st Century American clergyman of the Catholic Church
- Cirilo Flores Estrada (1779–1826), Guatemalan politician
