= Salvatore Cordileone =

American Catholic prelate (born 1956)

His Excellency, The Most Reverend Salvatore Cordileone
- Archbishop of San Francisco
- Cordileone in 2021
- Archdiocese: San Francisco
- Appointed: July 27, 2012
- Installed: October 4, 2012
- Predecessor: George Hugh Niederauer
- Other posts: Member, Supreme Tribunal of the Apostolic Signatura (2026–)
- Previous posts: Auxiliary Bishop of San Diego and Titular Bishop of Natchesium (2002–2009); Bishop of Oakland (2009–2012)

Orders
- Ordination: July 9, 1982 by Leo Thomas Maher
- Consecration: August 21, 2002 by Robert Brom, Raymond Leo Burke, Gilbert Espinosa Chávez

Personal details
- Born: Salvatore Joseph Cordileone; June 5, 1956 (age 70) San Diego, California, U.S.
- Education: San Diego State University; University of San Diego; Pontifical Gregorian University
- Motto: In verbo Tuo (Latin for 'In Thy word')
- Styles
- Reference style: His Excellency; The Most Reverend
- Spoken style: Your Excellency
- Religious style: Archbishop

Salvatore Joseph Cordileone (born June 5, 1956) is an American Catholic prelate who serves as Archbishop of San Francisco in California. He previously served as bishop of Oakland in California from 2009 to 2012 and as an auxiliary bishop for the Diocese of San Diego in California from 2002 to 2009.

A traditionalist theologian, he is known for his willingness to celebrate the Traditional Latin Mass. Cordileone is also known for his outspoken opposition to same-sex marriage and abortion. He has been a member of the Supreme Tribunal of the Apostolic Signatura since 2026.

== Early life ==
Cordileone was born on June 5, 1956, in San Diego, California, and attended Crawford High School from 1971 to 1974. He then studied at San Diego State University for a year before entering the University of San Diego, earning a Bachelor of Arts degree in philosophy in 1978. He then furthered his studies in Rome at the Pontifical Gregorian University, earning a Bachelor of Sacred Theology degree in 1981.

== Ecclesiastical career ==
=== Priesthood ===
Returning to California, Cordileone was ordained to the priesthood at Our Mother of Confidence Church in San Diego for the Diocese of San Diego by Bishop Leo Maher on July 9, 1982. After his ordination, the diocese assigned Cordileone as an associate pastor at Saint Martin of Tours Parish in La Mesa, California, until 1985. Cordileone then returned to the Gregorian University, where he earned a Doctor of Canon Law degree in 1989. Back in San Diego, he was appointed as priest secretary to Bishop Robert Brom and a tribunal judge (1989–1990), adjutant judicial vicar (1990–1991), and pastor of Our Lady of Guadalupe Parish in Calexico, California (1991–1995).

In 1995, Cordileone went to Rome to work as an assistant at the Supreme Tribunal of the Apostolic Signatura, the highest judicial body in the Vatican. The Vatican raised him to the rank of Chaplain of His Holiness in 1999.

=== Auxiliary Bishop of San Diego ===
On July 5, 2002, Cordileone was appointed as auxiliary bishop of San Diego and titular bishop of Natchesium by Pope John Paul II. He received his episcopal consecration at the Immaculata Church of the University of San Diego on August 21, 2002, from Brom, with Bishops Raymond Burke and Gilbert Espinosa Chávez serving as co-consecrators.

Cordileone serves on the episcopal advisory board of the Institute for Religious Life at University of Saint Mary of the Lake in Mundelein, Illinois and St. Gianna Physician's Guild in San Diego Cordileone is considered to be theologically conservative. At the 2006 meeting of the U.S. Conference of Catholic Bishops (USCCB) in Baltimore, in the course of consideration of the document which issued as "Happy Are Those Who Are Called to His Supper" he proposed to the gathered bishops that the use of artificial contraception should be included in a list of thoughts or actions constituting a grave matter. His proposal was defeated, although the bishops approved a separate document saying that "contraception is objectively immoral."

Within the USCCB, Cordileone sat on the Bishops' and Presidents' Committee on Catholic Education from 2006 to 2009.

=== Bishop of Oakland ===
Cordileone was named the fourth bishop of Oakland by Pope Benedict XVI on March 23, 2009. Filling the vacancy left by Bishop Allen Vigneron's promotion to archbishop of Detroit in January, Cordileone's relatively quick appointment was speculated to have been related to accusations that the diocese's interim administrator had blessed same-sex unions. Cordileone was installed on May 5, 2009, at the Cathedral of Christ the Light in Oakland.

In September 2009, Cordileone offered a Pontifical High Mass (in Latin, Missa Pontificalis) at Saint Margaret Mary Church in Oakland. This was the first time a Tridentine Pontifical High Mass was offered in Northern California after the liturgical changes that followed the Second Vatican Council were finalized in 1969.

From 2011 to 2017, Cordileone served as chair of the USCCB Ad Hoc Committee for the Defense of Marriage, working against the legalization of same-sex marriage. The USCCB described his mission as preserving the definition of marriage as the union between one man and one woman. In a June 2012 EWTN News interview, Cordileone stated that redefining marriage to include LGBTQ couples would be bad for children, detrimental to society and dangerous for religious freedom.

=== Archbishop of San Francisco ===
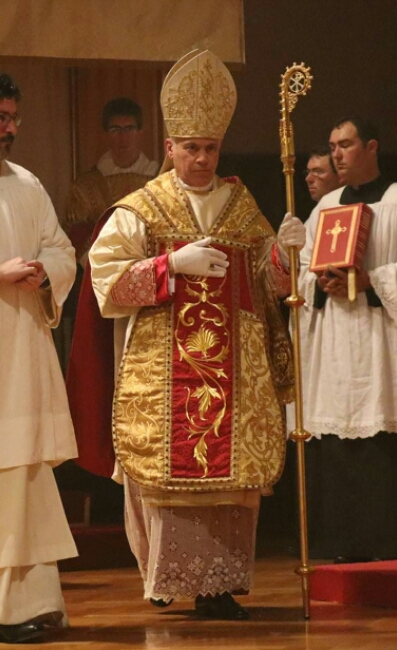
Archbishop Cordileone in 2021 in traditional vestments celebrating Pontifical High Mass in the Extraordinary Form of the Roman Rite.

==== Appointment ====
On July 27, 2012, Benedict XVI named Cordileone as archbishop of San Francisco. The appointment of Cordileone, and the acceptance of the resignation of his predecessor, Archbishop George Niederauer, were both announced on July 27 in Washington, D.C., by Archbishop Carlo Maria Viganò, papal and apostolic nuncio to the United States. Cordileone was installed on October 4, 2012, at the Cathedral of Saint Mary of the Assumption in San Francisco.

==== Drunk driving offense ====
Shortly before his installation as archbishop, on August 26, 2012, Cordileone was arrested for driving under the influence of alcohol at a police checkpoint in San Diego. His mother and a visiting priest from Germany were with him in the car. The arresting officer said that Cordileone "was a driver that was obviously impaired but he was quite cordial and polite throughout. He was not a belligerent drunk at all." Cordileone spent the night in police custody, then was released the next day. In a statement, he apologized and asked forgiveness.

Cordileone was scheduled to appear in court on a misdemeanor charge of driving under the influence. However, he pleaded guilty to a reduced charge of reckless driving. Cordileone was subsequently sentenced to three years of probation and ordered to pay a fine. The court also required him to attend a Mothers Against Drunk Driving victim-impact panel and participate in a three-month first conviction program through the California Department of Motor Vehicles.

==== Teacher handbook revisions ====
In February 2015, Cordileone told archdiocesan school teachers that they were expected to conduct their public lives in a way that did not undermine or deny Catholic doctrine.

Democratic California State Assemblyman Phil Ting of San Francisco and Kevin Mullin of San Mateo immediately wrote a letter of protest to Cordileone. It was signed by every lawmaker representing the communities served by the four Catholic high schools in San Francisco, San Mateo and Marin counties. The letter urged Cordileone to withdraw what they called "discriminatory morality clauses".

Cordileone responded to the letter, saying he "respects the lawmakers' right to hire whoever may advance their mission and that he is asking for the same respect". Ting and Mullin then called for an investigation of working conditions at archdiocesan high schools over the archbishop's proposed morality clauses for teachers.

==== Call for replacement ====
In April 2015, over 100 Catholic donors and church members from the Bay Area signed a full-page advertisement in the San Francisco Chronicle, appealing to Pope Francis to replace Cordileone as archbishop. The ad specifically objected to Cordileone's characterization of extramarital sex and LGBTQ relationships as "gravely evil", saying that he fostered "...an atmosphere of division and intolerance". The archdiocese responded that the advertisement was a "misrepresentation of the spirit of the archbishop" and that the signers did not speak for Bay Area Catholics. An opinion piece in San Mateo Daily Journal characterized the supporters of the advertisement as "dissidents". The archdiocese reported receiving 7,500 letters of support from around the world. A picnic in support of Cordileone was organized in May 2015 at Sue Bierman Park in San Francisco, with hundreds of people in attendance.

==== USCCB committee chair election ====
In Baltimore in November 2018, the General Assembly of the United States Conference of Catholic Bishops appointed Cordileone as chair of the Committee on Laity, Marriage, Family Life, and Youth. The voting was tied between Archbishop Charles Chaput of Philadelphia and Bishop John Doerfler of Marquette, each receiving 125 votes. Following the USCCB rules, Cordileone was then appointed chair because he was the senior bishop on the committee.

== Public positions ==
=== Same-sex marriage ===
Cordileone in 2008 helped draft Proposition 8, a proposed amendment to the California State Constitution, that defined marriage as being between one man and one woman. He also raised substantial sums to campaign for the amendment. He said, "Only one idea of marriage can stand [...] If that's going to be considered bigoted, we're going to see our rights being taken away–as is already happening."

In 2009, Cordileone was one of 17 bishops in the United States to sign the Manhattan Declaration: A Call of Christian Conscience. This document opposed same-sex marriage, legal abortion and assisted suicide, and condemned what the signers believed was an infringement on freedom of religion.

In an interview with USA Today in March 2013, Cordileone discussed the US Supreme Court's then-pending decision on the constitutionality of Proposition 8. He argued that same-sex marriage would harm children. Cordileone personally contributed $13,000 in support of Proposition 8.

Cordileone was a featured speaker in the June 2014 March for Marriage in Washington DC, which was attended by several hundred protestors. The event was organized by the National Organization for Marriage. Before the event, at least 80 religious leaders, lawmakers, and officials (including the mayor of San Francisco) collected a petition with 30,000 signatures, urging him not to attend. They specifically objected to Cordileone "marching and sharing the podium with individuals who have repeatedly denigrated lesbian, gay, bisexual, and transgender people." House of Representatives Speaker Nancy Pelosi also wrote privately to Cordileone, urging him not to participate in the event. Cordileone responded that the March was not intended to be anti-LGBTQ or anti-anything, but pro-marriage.

=== Discrimination ===
In June 2014, Cordileone and several other bishops criticized the reported intention of U.S. President Barack Obama to issue an executive order on LGBTQ employment. This order would have outlawed job discrimination on the basis of sexual orientation and gender identity in businesses with federal contracts. The bishops said that the order might force Catholic managers to violate their personal religious beliefs. The same bishops in July 2014 argued that the order was "not about protecting persons, but behavior". They said that the order used "the force of the law to coerce everyone to accept a deeply problematic understanding of human sexuality and sexual behavior and to condone such behavior".

=== Abortion ===
In a November 2021 interview, Cordileone said that women should receive medical and material support, along with spiritual support, during pregnancy:

Every child in the mother's womb should be welcomed with open arms in our society. But so many women need support, they need not only medical care – again, this is integral – not only medical care, they need emotional support, moral support, sometimes they need counseling, they need spiritual support, and other types of material support after the baby is born as well.

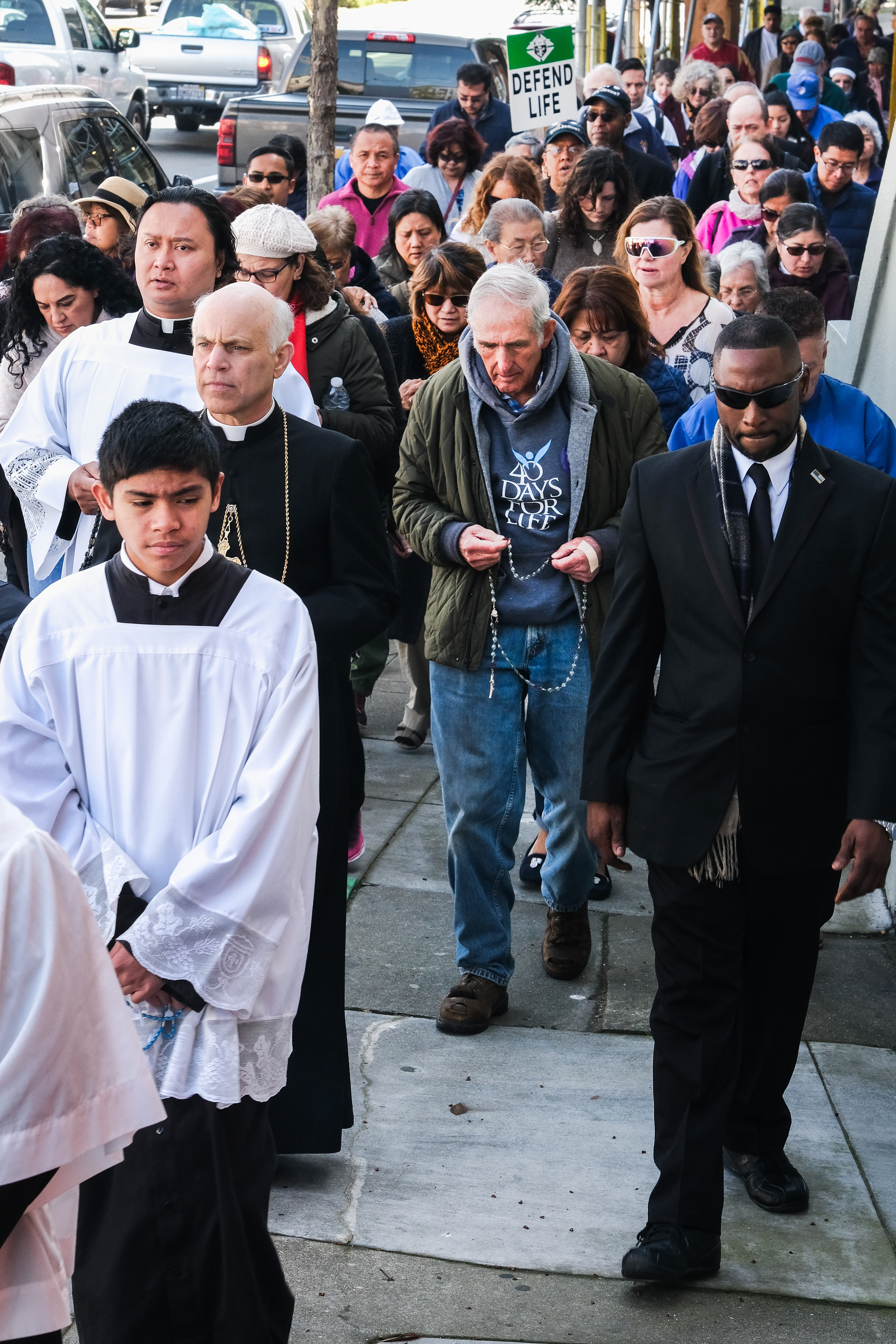
Archbishop Cordileone marching with anti-abortion protesters (2019)

In April 2022, Cordileone warned Pelosi, a Catholic resident of San Francisco, that he would prohibit her from receiving the Eucharist within the archdiocese unless she repudiated her support of legal abortion. He stated, "A Catholic legislator who supported procured abortion, after knowing the teaching of the Church, commits a manifestly grave sin which is a cause of most serious scandal to others." In May 2022, Cordileone notified Pelosi and publicly announced that he took that action.

Cordileone's action against Pelosi came following the May 2022 Supreme Court leak, suggesting that it might overturn its 1973 Roe v. Wade decision legalizing abortion nationwide. It was also expected that congressional Democrats would attempt to codify legal abortion nationwide. Cordileone had previously objected to Pelosi in 2021, when she referred to herself as a "devout Catholic" during a news conference. Cordileone claimed that Pelosi has refused to communicate with him after she decided to support the Women's Health Protection Act in September 2021. Also in May 2022, he supported denying the Eucharist to US President Joe Biden, himself a Catholic, based on his support for legal abortion.

=== COVID-19 vaccination ===
Cordileone advised Catholics to get vaccinated during the COVID-19 pandemic of 2019 to 2023. However, in a December 2021 interview with the San Francisco Chronicle, he reported that he did not get a COVID-19 vaccination, that his "immune system is strong," and that his personal physician had told him that "it's probably not necessary" for him to be vaccinated. This disclosure led parishioners of St. Agnes Church to request that Cordileone delay a planned visit to the church.

== Coat of arms ==
The coat of arms chosen by Cordileone has two sections. The upper part is a representation of his Italian surname Cor di leone, which means "lion's heart", and shows the top part of a lion rampant holding a red heart in its paws. The lower part shows a red crab, a reference to the crab-fishing occupation of the Cordileone family on its arrival in California and as a reference to a bishop's duty to be a "fisher of men" (Luke 5:10). The motto, In verbo tuo, meaning "At your word" is a reference to the response of Peter, "At your word I will let down the nets", when invited by Jesus: "Put out into the deep and let down your nets for a catch" (Luke 5:4–5).

== See also ==
- Catholic Church hierarchy
- Catholic Church in the United States
- Historical list of the Catholic bishops of the United States
- List of Catholic bishops of the United States
- Lists of patriarchs, archbishops, and bishops

== Episcopal succession ==
Catholic Church titles
Preceded by George Hugh Niederauer	Archbishop of San Francisco; 2012–present	Incumbent
Preceded by Allen Henry Vigneron	Bishop of Oakland; 2009–2012	Succeeded by Michael C. Barber
Preceded by –	Auxiliary Bishop of San Diego; 2002–2009	Succeeded by –
