= Felipe Pulido =

Mexican American Catholic prelate (born 1970)

His Excellency, The Most Reverend Felipe Pulido
- Auxiliary Bishop of San Diego
- Diocese: San Diego
- Appointed: June 6, 2023
- Installed: September 28, 2023
- Other post: Titular Bishop of Buffada

Orders
- Ordination: June 28, 2002 by Carlos Arthur Sevilla
- Consecration: September 28, 2023 by Robert W. McElroy, Joseph J. Tyson, and John P. Dolan

Personal details
- Born: January 13, 1970 (age 56) Dos Aguas, Michoacán, Mexico
- Education: Mount Angel Seminary; Pontifical North American College; Pontifical University of Saint Thomas Aquinas
- Motto: Building communio
- Styles
- Reference style: His Excellency; The Most Reverend
- Spoken style: Your Excellency
- Religious style: Bishop

Felipe Pulido (born January 13, 1970) is a Mexican American Catholic prelate serving as an auxiliary bishop of the Diocese of San Diego in California since 2023.

== Biography ==
=== Early life ===
Pulido was born on January 13, 1970, in Dos Aguas in the State of Michoacán in Mexico. He attended school in Mexico, but the family immigrated to Yakima, Washington, in the United States in 1988 for agricultural work while Pulido was in high school. As a teenager, he worked picking fruit and vegetables. Pulido finished high school in Yakima.

After providing care to an elderly priest, Pulido decided to become a priest himself. In 1994, he entered Mount Angel Seminary in St. Benedict, Oregon. He graduated from Mount Angel in 1998 with a Bachelor of Arts degree in philosophy. Pulido then traveled to Rome to enter the seminary at the Pontifical North American College. In 2000, Pulido was awarded a Bachelor of Sacred Theology degree with high honors from the Pontifical University of Saint Thomas Aquinas in Rome. Pulido then studied at the Pontifical John Paul II Institute for Marriage and Family in Rome from 2001 to 2002.

=== Priesthood ===
After returning to Washington State, Pulido was ordained on June 28, 2002, to the priesthood for the Diocese of Yakima at Saint Paul Cathedral in Yakima by Bishop Carlos Sevilla.

After his 2002 ordination, the diocese assigned Pulido as a parochial vicar at Holy Family Parish in Yakima. In 2003, he was transferred to Our Lady of Fatima Parish in Moses Lake, Washington, where he stay for three years. Pulido was appointed pastor of Our Lady of the Snows Parish in Leavenworth, Washington, in 2006.

The diocese appointed Pulido in 2008 as pastor of both Our Lady of Fatima and Queen of All Saints Parish in Warden, Washington. Additionally, in 2011, Bishop Joseph J. Tyson named Pulido as vicar for clergy and director of vocations. In 2012, the diocese transferred Pulido from Our Lady of Fatima and Queen of All Saints Parishes to serve as pastor of St. Joseph Parish in Yakima. He would remain at St. Joseph for the next eight years. Pulido's final pastoral assignment in Yakima came in 2020 when he was named pastor of St. Joseph Parish in Kennewick, Washington.

=== Auxiliary Bishop of San Diego ===
Pope Francis appointed Pulido as an auxiliary bishop of San Diego on June 6, 2023. On September 28, 2023, Pulido was consecrated as a bishop at St. Therese of Carmel Church in San Diego by Cardinal Robert McElroy, with Bishops Joseph Tyson and John Dolan serving as co-consecrators.

== See also ==
- Catholic Church hierarchy
- Catholic Church in the United States
- Historical list of the Catholic bishops of the United States
- List of Catholic bishops of the United States
- Lists of patriarchs, archbishops, and bishops

== Episcopal succession ==
Catholic Church titles
Preceded by -	Auxiliary Bishop of San Diego; 2023-Present	Succeeded by -
