= Gilbert Espinosa Chávez =

Auxiliary bishop of San Diego

His Excellency, The Most Reverend Gilbert Espinosa Chávez
- Auxiliary Bishop Emeritus of San Diego; Titular Bishop of Magarmel
- Church: Roman Catholic Church
- Archdiocese: Los Angeles
- Diocese: San Diego
- Appointed: April 9, 1974
- Installed: June 21, 1974
- Term ended: June 1, 2007
- Other post: Titular Bishop of Magarmel

Orders
- Ordination: March 19, 1960
- Consecration: June 21, 1974 by Leo Thomas Maher, John R. Quinn, and Patrick Flores

Personal details
- Born: May 9, 1932 Ontario, California
- Died: March 15, 2020 (aged 87) San Diego

Styles of Gilbert Espinosa Chávez
- Reference style: His Excellency; The Most Reverend
- Spoken style: Your Excellency
- Religious style: Bishop

Ordination history of Gilbert Espinosa Chávez
History
Episcopal consecration
- Consecrated by: Leo Thomas Maher
Episcopal succession
Bishops consecrated by Gilbert Espinosa Chávez as principal consecrator
- Salvatore Joseph Cordileone: August 21, 2002

Gilbert Espinosa Chávez (March 10, 1932 – March 15, 2020) was an American prelate of the Catholic Church who served as auxiliary bishop of the Diocese of San Diego.

== Biography ==
Gilbert Chávez was born in Ontario, California. He studied at Immaculate Heart Seminary in San Diego and was ordained a priest of the San Diego diocese on March 19, 1960.

Chávez was appointed auxiliary bishop of the Diocese of San Diego and titular bishop of Magarmel on April 9, 1974, by Pope Paul VI. He was consecrated on June 21, 1974. He was the second Mexican-American priest to be elevated to the rank of bishop in the US Catholic Church.

Pope Benedict XVI accepted Chávez's resignation on June 1, 2007.

Chávez died on March 15, 2020, at Nazareth House in San Diego.

== Episcopal succession ==
Catholic Church titles
Preceded by Thomas Leo Parker	Roman Catholic Titular See of Margarmel; 1974–2020	Succeeded by –
