= Mount Union, Iowa =

- Census-designated place
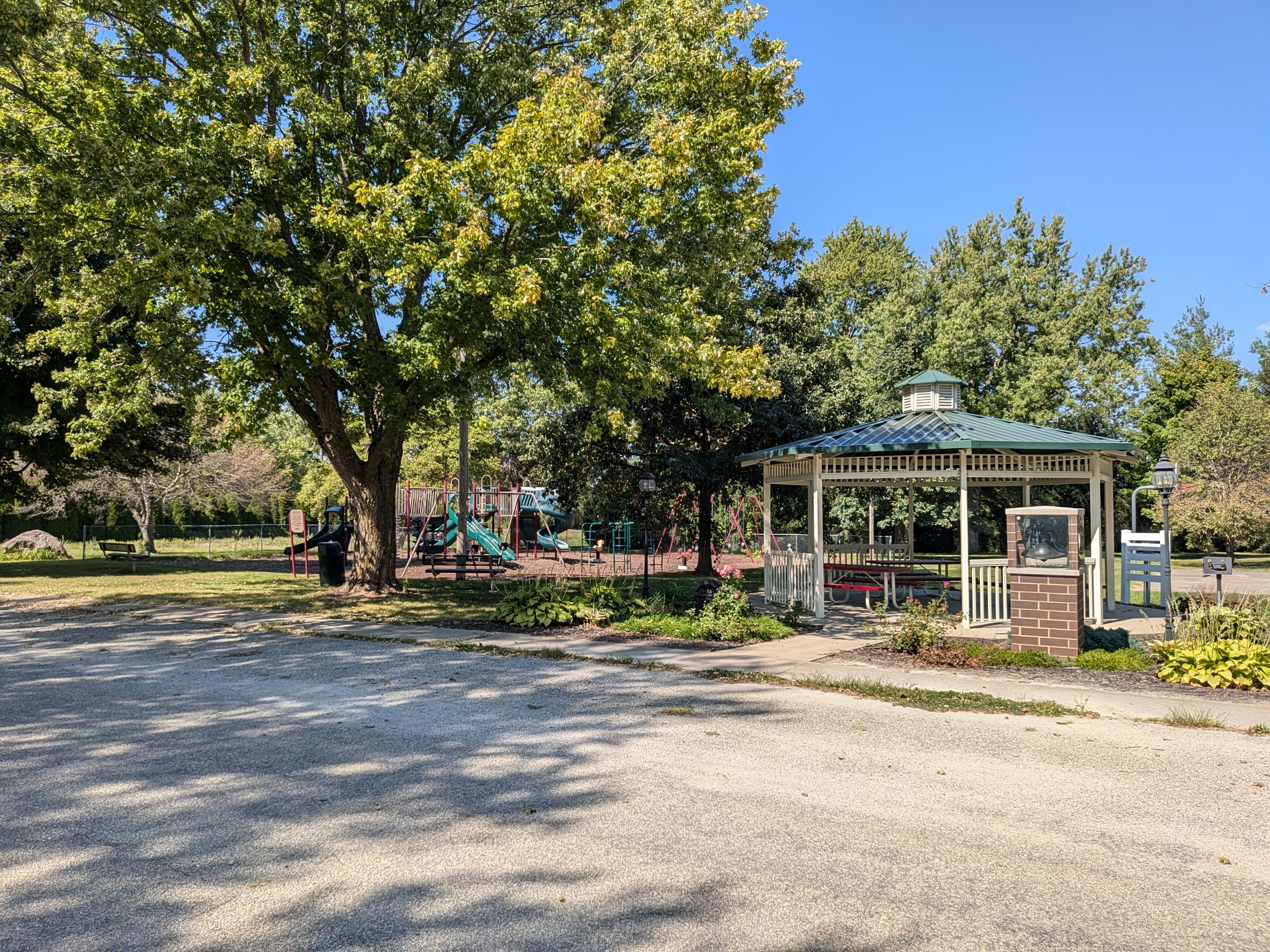
- A city park in Mount Union

- Location of Mount Union, Iowa
- Coordinates: 41°03′28″N 91°23′29″W
- Country: United States
- State: Iowa
- County: Henry

Area
  - Total: 0.17 sq mi (0.44 km^{2})
  - Land: 0.17 sq mi (0.44 km^{2})
  - Water: 0 sq mi (0.00 km^{2})
- Elevation: 732 ft (223 m)

Population (2020)
  - Total: 120
  - Density: 710.5/sq mi (274.33/km^{2})
- Time zone: UTC-6 (Central (CST))
  - Summer (DST): UTC-5 (CDT)
- ZIP code: 52644
- Area code: 319
- FIPS code: 19-54795
- GNIS feature ID: 2790739

Mount Union is an unincorporated community and census-designated place (CDP) in Henry County, Iowa, United States. It was formerly a city, but in a November 2016 referendum residents voted 32 to 31 to unincorporate. The 2020 census reported the city population to be 120.

== Geography ==
According to the United States Census Bureau, in 2010 the city had an area of 0.11 square miles (0.28 km^{2}), all land.

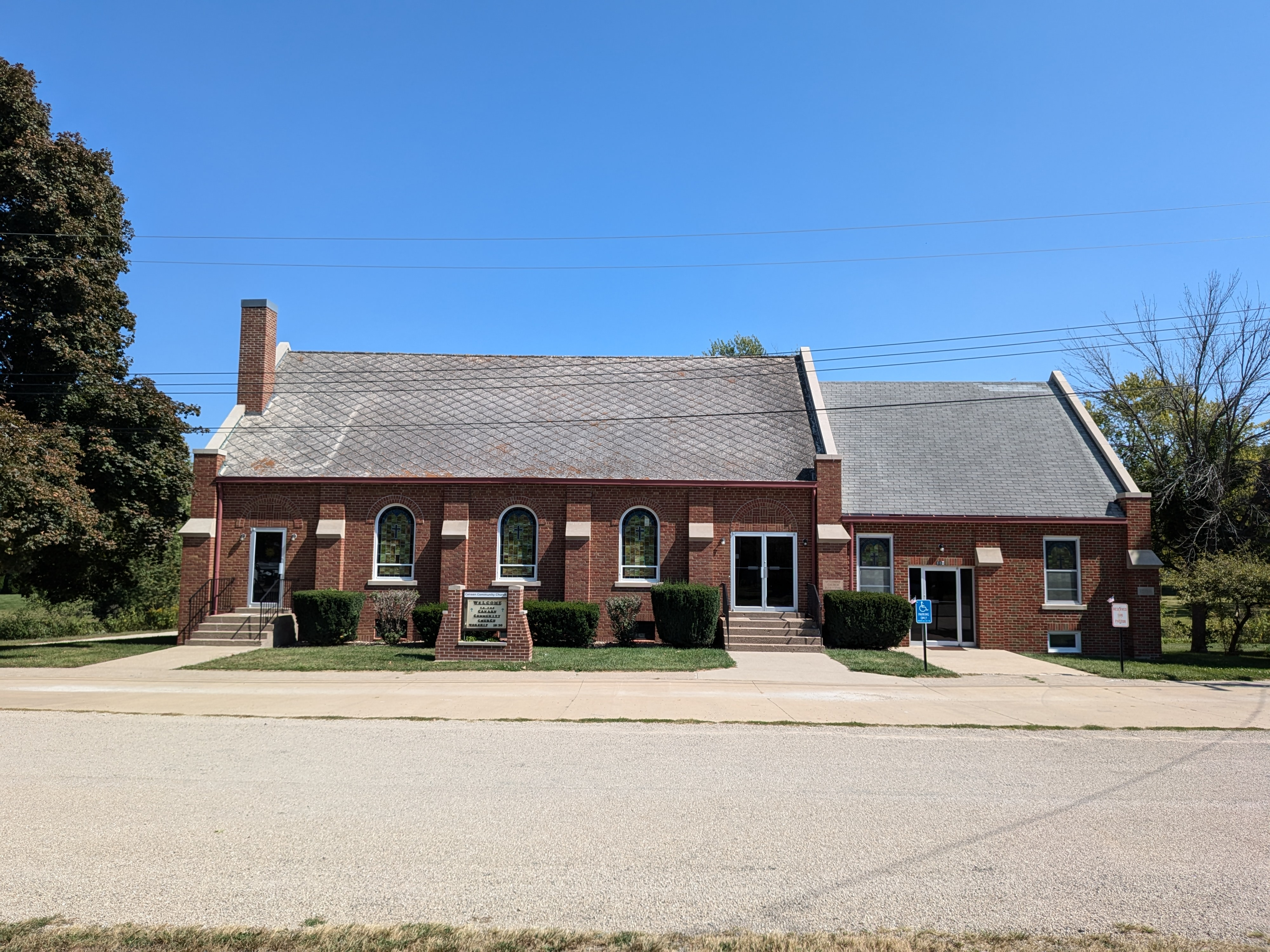
Canaan Community Church in Mount Union

== Demographics ==
Historical populations
Year	Pop.	±%
1880	44	—
1910	195	+343.2%
1920	225	+15.4%
1930	167	−25.8%
1940	186	+11.4%
1950	167	−10.2%
1960	176	+5.4%
1970	173	−1.7%
1980	145	−16.2%
1990	140	−3.4%
2000	132	−5.7%
2010	107	−18.9%
2020	120	+12.1%
Source:"U.S. Census website". United States Census Bureau. and Iowa Data Center; Source: U.S. Decennial Census

=== 2020 census ===
As of the census of 2020, there were 120 people, 46 households, and 34 families residing in the community. The population density was 710.5 inhabitants per square mile (274.3/km^{2}). There were 52 housing units at an average density of 307.9 per square mile (118.9/km^{2}). The racial makeup of the community was 87.5% White, 0.0% Black or African American, 0.0% Native American, 0.0% Asian, 0.0% Pacific Islander, 0.8% from other races and 11.7% from two or more races. Hispanic or Latino persons of any race comprised 1.7% of the population.

Of the 46 households, 39.1% of which had children under the age of 18 living with them, 56.5% were married couples living together, 15.2% were cohabitating couples, 6.5% had a female householder with no spouse or partner present and 21.7% had a male householder with no spouse or partner present. 26.1% of all households were non-families. 19.6% of all households were made up of individuals, 10.9% had someone living alone who was 65 years old or older.

The median age in the community was 41.5 years. 32.5% of the residents were under the age of 20; 0.8% were between the ages of 20 and 24; 21.7% were from 25 and 44; 29.2% were from 45 and 64; and 15.8% were 65 years of age or older. The gender makeup of the community was 52.5% male and 47.5% female.

=== 2010 census ===
As of the census of 2010, there were 107 people, 43 households, and 27 families living in the city. The population density was 972.7 inhabitants per square mile (375.6/km^{2}). There were 54 housing units at an average density of 490.9 per square mile (189.5/km^{2}). The racial makeup of the city was 100.0% White. Hispanic or Latino of any race were 3.7% of the population.

There were 43 households, of which 37.2% had children under the age of 18 living with them, 51.2% were married couples living together, 7.0% had a female householder with no husband present, 4.7% had a male householder with no wife present, and 37.2% were non-families. 32.6% of all households were made up of individuals, and 9.4% had someone living alone who was 65 years of age or older. The average household size was 2.49 and the average family size was 3.26.

The median age in the city was 35.9 years. 32.7% of residents were under the age of 18; 1.7% were between the ages of 18 and 24; 22.5% were from 25 to 44; 29.9% were from 45 to 64; and 13.1% were 65 years of age or older. The gender makeup of the city was 48.6% male and 51.4% female.

=== 2000 census ===
As of the census of 2000, there were 132 people, 51 households, and 39 families living in the city. The population density was 1,188.4 inhabitants per square mile (458.8/km^{2}). There were 57 housing units at an average density of 513.2 per square mile (198.1/km^{2}). The racial makeup of the city was 96.97% White, and 3.03% from two or more races.

There were 51 households, out of which 43.1% had children under the age of 18 living with them, 68.6% were married couples living together, and 23.5% were non-families. 21.6% of all households were made up of individuals, and 3.9% had someone living alone who was 65 years of age or older. The average household size was 2.59 and the average family size was 2.97.

In the city, the population was spread out, with 30.3% under the age of 18, 3.0% from 18 to 24, 37.9% from 25 to 44, 18.2% from 45 to 64, and 10.6% who were 65 years of age or older. The median age was 34 years. For every 100 females, there were 88.6 males. For every 100 females age 18 and over, there were 104.4 males.

The median income for a household in the city was $27,500, and the median income for a family was $31,250. Males had a median income of $30,714 versus $22,500 for females. The per capita income for the city was $12,735. There were 20.0% of families and 21.6% of the population living below the poverty line, including 6.8% of under eighteens and 25.0% of those over 64.

== Education ==
Mount Union is part of the Winfield-Mt. Union Community School District.

== Notable person ==
- Leo Thomas Maher, Catholic bishop

== See also ==
- List of Discontinued cities in Iowa
