= Cirilo B. Flores =

American lawyer and bishop

His Excellency, The Most Reverend Cirilo Flores
- Bishop of San Diego
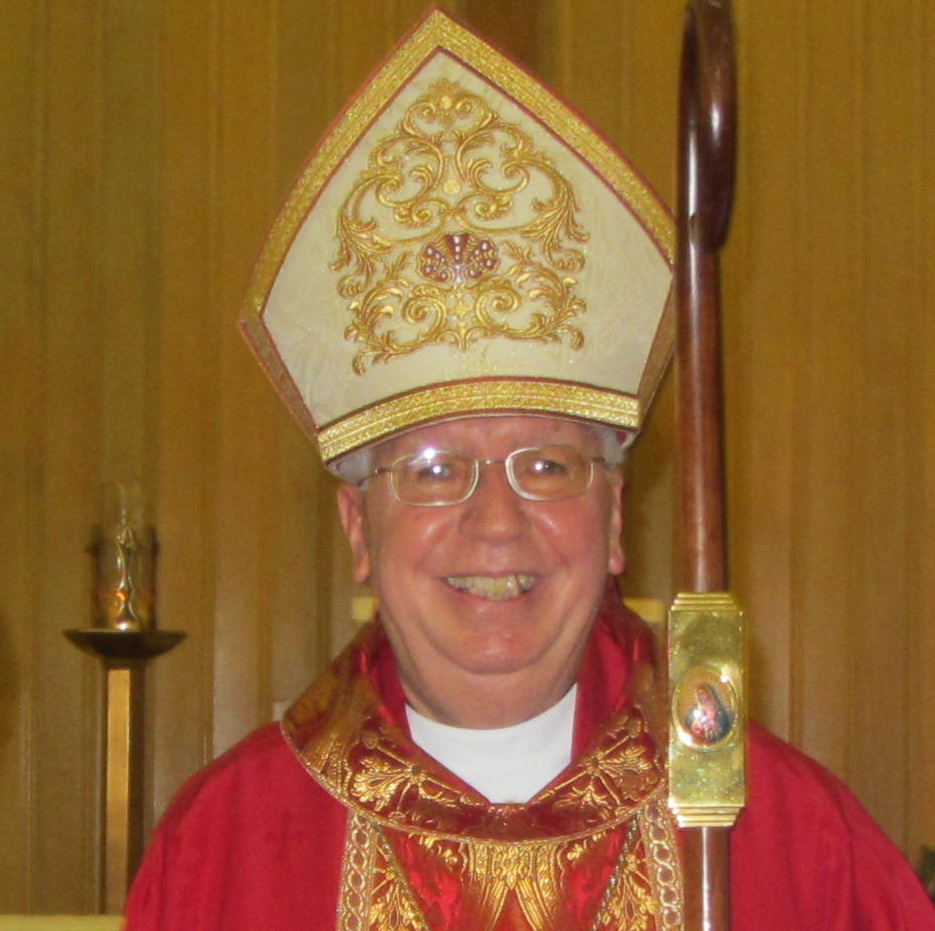
- Flores in 2013
- Diocese: San Diego
- Appointed: January 4, 2012 (coadjutor)
- Installed: September 18, 2013
- Term ended: September 6, 2014
- Predecessor: Robert Brom
- Successor: Robert W. McElroy
- Previous posts: Coadjutor Bishop of San Diego (2012–2013); Auxiliary Bishop of Orange (2009–2012)

Orders
- Ordination: June 8, 1991 by Norman Francis McFarland
- Consecration: March 19, 2009 by Tod Brown

Personal details
- Born: June 20, 1948 Corona, California, US
- Died: September 6, 2014 (aged 66) Nazareth House, San Diego, California, US
- Denomination: Roman Catholic Church
- Education: Loyola Marymount University; Stanford Law School; St. John's Seminary
- Motto: For the greater glory of God

Styles of Cirilo Flores
- Reference style: The Most Reverend
- Spoken style: Your Excellency
- Religious style: Monsignor
- Posthumous style: not applicable

Cirilo B. Flores (June 20, 1948 – September 6, 2014) was an American prelate of the Roman Catholic Church who served as bishop of the Diocese of San Diego in California from 2013 until his death in 2014. He previously served as coadjutor bishop of the same diocese from 2012 until 2013 and as an auxiliary bishop of the Diocese of Orange in California from 2009 until 2012.

== Biography ==
=== Early life ===
Cirilo Flores was born on June 20, 1948, in Corona, California; one of six children, he had three brothers and two sisters. His father was from Sinaloa, Mexico. He attended the Corona School District and St. Edward School. After graduating from Notre Dame High School in Riverside, California, in 1966, he studied at Loyola Marymount University in Los Angeles. In 1968, Flores entered the novitiate of the Society of Jesus, but left to pursue a legal career. He completed his bachelor's degree at Loyola Marymount University in 1970. Flores later said, "I went in conflicted to begin with. I couldn't decide if I wanted to be a priest or a lawyer."

Flores then entered Stanford University School of Law in California, earning his Juris Doctor in 1976. He then practiced law in Southern California for ten years, focusing on business litigation. He also worked at firms in Beverly Hills and Newport Beach, California. Feeling a returning call to the priesthood, he entered St. John's Seminary in Camarillo, California, in 1986, receiving a Master of Divinity (M.Div.) degree, the prerequisite to presbyteral ordination.

=== Priesthood ===
Flores was ordained a priest for the Diocese of Orange at Holy Family Cathedral in Orange, California, by Bishop Norman McFarland on June 8, 1991. After his ordination, the diocese assigned Flores as parochial vicar at St. Barbara Parish in Santa Ana, California, and at St. Joachim Parish in Costa Mesa, California.

After briefly serving as the administrator of Our Lady of Mt. Carmel Parish in Newport Beach, Flores became parochial vicar of Our Lady of Guadalupe Parish in La Habra, California, in 1997. He was named pastor of St. Anne Parish in Santa Ana, California, in July 2000, and later of St. Norbert Parish in Orange in September 2008.

Flores was also a member of the Diocesan Finance Council, Clergy Personnel Board, and editorial board of the Orange diocesan newspaper, the Orange County Catholic. Flores was a commander of the Equestrian Order of the Holy Sepulchre of Jerusalem.

=== Auxiliary bishop of Orange ===
On January 5, 2009, Flores was appointed as an auxiliary bishop of Orange and Titular Bishop of Quiza by Pope Benedict XVI. He received his episcopal consecration on March 19, 2009, from Bishop Tod Brown, with Bishops Dominic Mai Luong and Norman McFarland serving as co-consecrators, at St. Columban Church in Garden Grove, California. Flores selected as his episcopal motto: "For the Greater Glory of God."

=== Coadjutor Bishop and Bishop of San Diego ===
On January 4, 2012, the apostolic nuncio to the United States announced that Flores had been named by Pope Benedict XVI as the coadjutor bishop of San Diego, with immediate right of succession to Bishop Robert Henry Brom. On September 18, 2013, Pope Francis accepted Brom's resignation and Flores automatically succeeded him as bishop of San Diego.

On April 16, 2014, Flores suffered a stroke in his office at the Pastoral Center and was hospitalized. On September 4, 2014, it was reported that Flores was suffering from an aggressive form of cancer. Doctors did not consider him a good candidate for cancer treatment; he went instead on palliative care in San Diego. Cirilo Flores died on September 6, 2014, at Nazareth House in San Diego. At his bedside were his cousin Dr. Tom Martinez, Monsignor Steven Callahan and the Sisters of Nazareth.

Catholic Church titles
Preceded by José Guadalupe Torres Campos	— TITULAR — Bishop of Quiza; 2009–2012	Succeeded by Genadijus Linas Vodopjanovas
Preceded by Robert Henry Brom	Bishop of San Diego; 2013–2014	Succeeded by Robert W. McElroy
