= Leo Thomas Maher =

American prelate

His Excellency. The Most Reverend Leo Thomas Maher
- Bishop of San Diego
- See: Diocese of San Diego
- Installed: August 22, 1969
- Term ended: July 10, 1990
- Predecessor: Francis James Furey
- Successor: Robert Henry Brom
- Other post: Bishop of Santa Rosa (1962–1969)

Orders
- Ordination: December 18, 1943 by John Joseph Mitty
- Consecration: April 5, 1962 by Egidio Vagnozzi

Personal details
- Born: July 1, 1915 Mount Union, Iowa, U.S.
- Died: February 23, 1991 (aged 75) San Diego, California, U.S.
- Buried: Holy Cross Cemetery, San Diego, US
- Denomination: Roman Catholic Church
- Education: St. Joseph's College; Saint Patrick Seminary, Menlo Park
- Motto: Christus regnet (Christ reigns)

Ordination history of Leo Thomas Maher
History
Episcopal consecration
- Consecrated by: Egidio Vagnozzi
Episcopal succession
Bishops consecrated by Leo Thomas Maher as principal consecrator
- Gilbert Espinosa Chávez: June 21, 1974

Leo Thomas Maher (July 1, 1915 – February 23, 1991) was an American prelate of the Roman Catholic Church. He served as bishop of the Diocese of Santa Rosa in California (1962–1969) and as bishop of the Diocese of San Diego in California (1969–1990).

== Biography ==
=== Early life ===
Leo Maher was born on July 1, 1915, in Mount Union, Iowa, the fifth of nine children of Thomas Joseph Maher (1862–1941) and Mary Agnes Teberg (1886–1946). His father was a native of Shankill, County Kilkenny, Ireland.

As a child, he moved to California where he lived with his uncle, Rev. Edward J. Maher, pastor of St. Patrick Church in Oakland. From 1927 to 1929, Leo Maher attended St. Patrick Elementary School in Oakland. In 1929 He began his studies for the priesthood at St. Joseph High School and St. Joseph's College, both in Mountain View, California. Leo started the major seminary in 1938 and completed his theological studies in 1943 at Saint Patrick Seminary in Menlo Park, California.

=== Priesthood ===
Maher was ordained a priest for the Archdiocese of San Francisco by Archbishop John Mitty on December 18, 1943, at the Cathedral of Saint Mary of the Assumption in San Francisco.

Maher's first assignment was as a curate at Holy Name of Jesus Parish in San Francisco, where he remained for one year before serving at the Cathedral of St. Mary (1944–1947). He organized the prayer service for the 1945 meeting of the United Nations in San Francisco. From 1947 to 1961, Maher served as secretary to Archbishop Mitty. He was named a domestic prelate by Pope Pius XII on November 4, 1954. He served as chancellor of the archdiocese from 1956 to 1962.

=== Bishop of Santa Rosa ===
On January 27, 1962, Maher was appointed the first bishop of the newly erected Diocese of Santa Rosa by Pope John XXIII. He received his episcopal consecration on April 5, 1962, from Archbishop Egidio Vagnozzi, with Bishops Hugh Donohoe and Merlin Guilfoyle serving as co-consecrators, at the Cathedral of St. Mary of the Assumption.

During his seven-year tenure as bishop, Maher led a program to build new parishes and schools to serve the increasing Catholic population in the diocese, culminating in the establishment of seven parishes, one mission, three high schools, four elementary schools, and several rectories and convents. He also elevated three missions to parish status and oversaw major renovations of four existing parish churches. He attended all four sessions of the Second Vatican Council in Rome between 1962 and 1965.

=== Bishop of San Diego ===
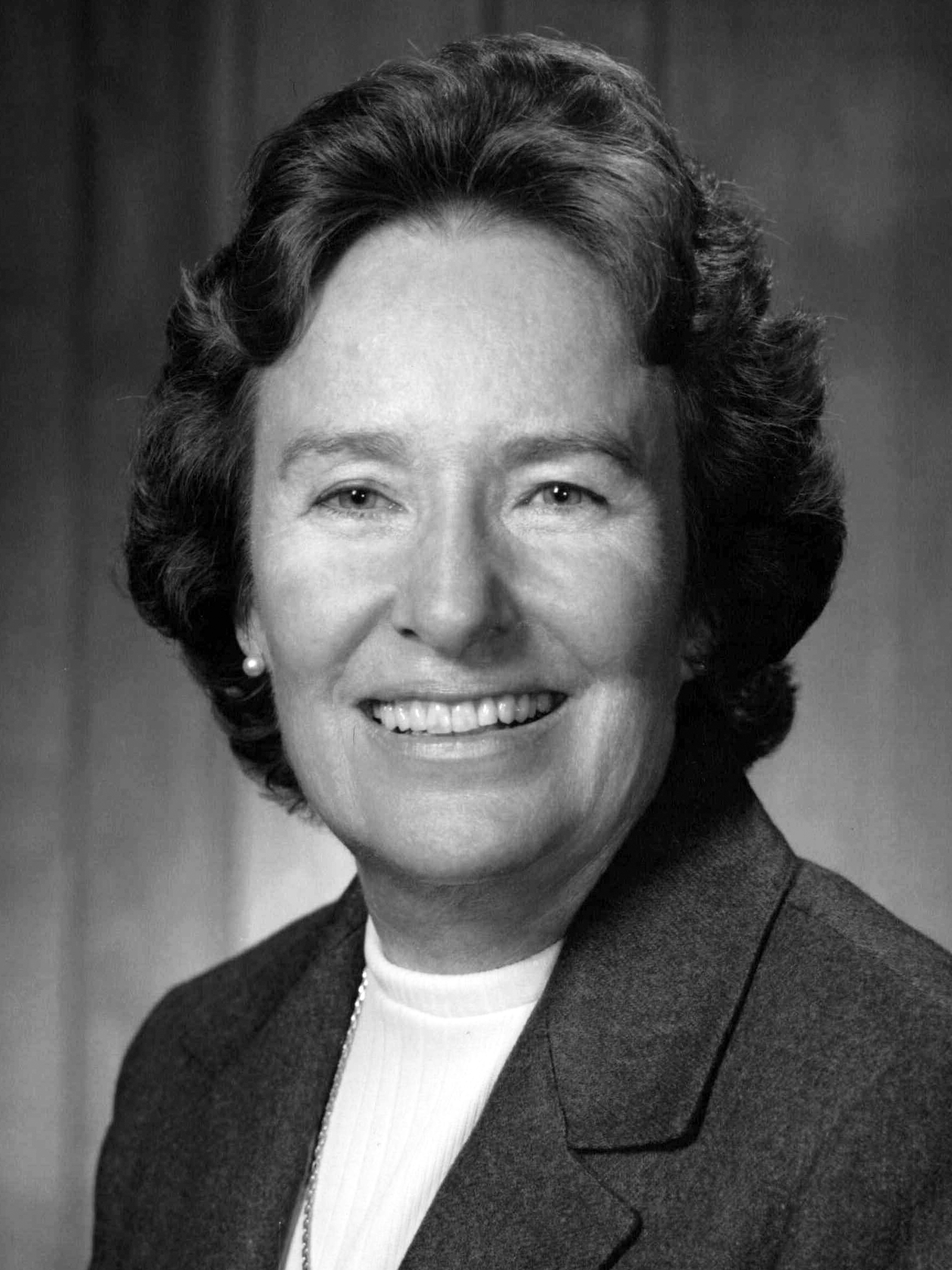
California Assemblywoman Lucy Killea (1978)

United Farm Workers flag

Following the promotion of Bishop Francis Furey to the Archdiocese of San Antonio, Maher was named the third bishop of San Diego on August 22, 1969, by Pope Paul VI. At the time of his arrival, the diocese was about $15 million in debt, which Maher fully retired by 1980. He presided over the second diocesan synod from 1973 to 1976, revising the statutes and guidelines of the diocese to implement the reforms of the Second Vatican Council. In 1976, Maher created the first diocesan Pastoral Council. He ended the official relationship between the diocese and the University of San Diego, establishing the school as a separate corporation.

Maher was a strong supporter of the ecumenical movement, co-founding the San Diego County Ecumenical Conference and issuing joint statements on morality with non-Catholic religious leaders. He also supported workers' rights to organize into unions, but pledged an official neutrality in a farm labor dispute in 1971. That same year, he suspended from ministry Reverend Victor Salandini, a San Diego priest and ally of labor organizer César Chávez. Saladini had worn a serape with the black eagle of the United Farm Workers instead of proper vestments during church functions and had used corn tortillas instead of sacramental bread during his masses.

In 1975, Maher prohibited Catholics who were members of pro-choice organizations from receiving communion or serving as lectors, specifically citing the National Organization for Women for its "shameless agitation." In 1980, Maher issued a public condemnation of the Ku Klux Klan, saying that knowingly voting for a racist or a Klan member may constitute a sin. He prohibited priests from celebrating mass for Dignity, a pro-LGBT Catholic organization. However, Maher once celebrated a mass for HIV/AIDS patients at St. Joseph Cathedral in San Diego

In November 1989, during a special election for the California State Senate in a San Diego–based district, Maher received national attention after prohibiting State Assemblywoman Lucy Killea, a Catholic Democrat, from receiving communion because of her support for abortion rights for women. According to Maher, her position placed her in "complete contradiction to the moral teachings of the Catholic Church." Killea, who refused to change her position, was the first political candidate to receive this censure. She eventually won the election, acknowledging (along with her opponent) that Maher's action helped her win by creating voter sympathy and publicizing her candidacy.

=== Retirement and legacy ===
Pope John Paul II accepted Maher's resignation as bishop of San Diego on July 10, 1990. That same year, he underwent two operations for a malignant brain tumor. Leo Maher died at his residence in Mission Hills, San Diego, on February 23, 1991, at age 75.

== Episcopal succession ==
Catholic Church titles
Preceded by None	Bishop of Santa Rosa in California; 1962–1969	Succeeded by Mark Joseph Hurley
Preceded by Francis James Furey	Bishop of San Diego; 1969–1990	Succeeded by Robert Henry Brom
