= Robert McElroy (cardinal) =

Eighth archbishop of Washington (born 1954)

His Eminence Robert McElroy
- Cardinal, Archbishop of Washington
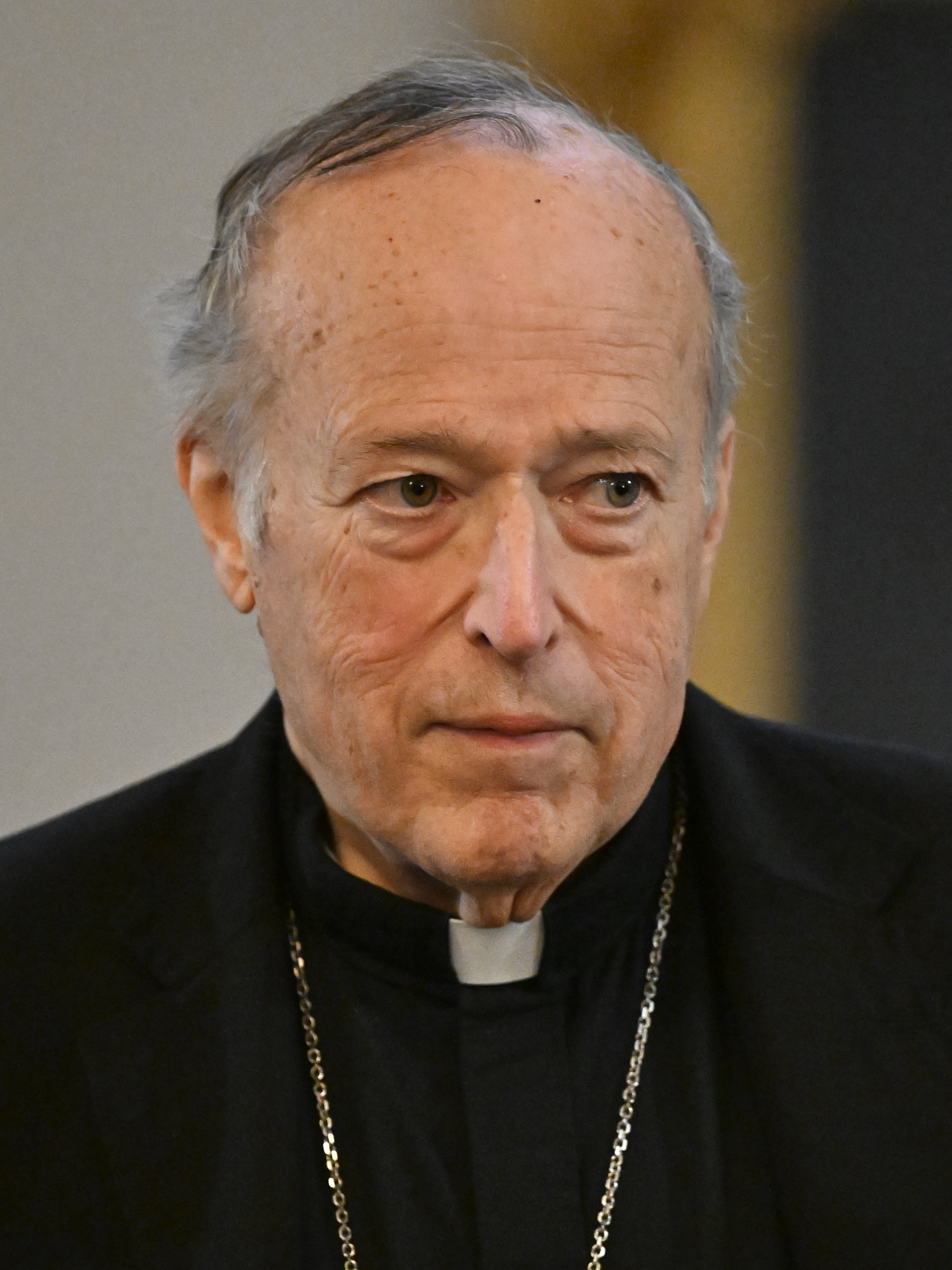
- McElroy in 2025
- Church: Catholic Church
- Archdiocese: Washington
- Appointed: January 6, 2025
- Installed: March 11, 2025
- Predecessor: Wilton Daniel Gregory
- Other post: Cardinal Priest of San Frumenzio ai Prati Fiscali (2022‍–‍present)
- Previous posts: Auxiliary Bishop of San Francisco and Titular Bishop of Gemellae (2010‍–‍2015); Bishop of San Diego (2015‍–‍2025)

Orders
- Ordination: April 12, 1980 by John Raphael Quinn
- Consecration: September 7, 2010 by George Hugh Niederauer
- Created cardinal: August 27, 2022 by Pope Francis
- Rank: Cardinal priest

Personal details
- Born: February 5, 1954 (age 72) San Francisco, California, U.S.
- Education: Harvard University (BA); Stanford University (MA, PhD); Saint Patrick's Seminary (MDiv); Santa Clara University (STL); Pontifical Gregorian University (STD)
- Motto: Dignitatis humanae (Latin for 'Of Human Dignity')
- Styles
- Reference style: His Eminence
- Spoken style: Your Eminence
- Religious style: Cardinal
- Informal style: Cardinal

Coat of arms before becoming a cardinal (used 2015‍–‍2022)

Robert Walter McElroy (born February 5, 1954) is an American Catholic prelate serving as Archbishop of Washington since 2025. He previously served as Bishop of San Diego from 2015 to 2025. He was made a cardinal in 2022.

McElroy was ordained a priest for the Archdiocese of San Francisco in 1980. He later received advanced theological degrees from Santa Clara University and the Pontifical Gregorian University and has written articles for the Jesuit magazine America. McElroy was widely regarded as a supporter of the policies of Pope Francis.

== Early life and education ==
Robert Walter McElroy was born into a Catholic family in San Francisco, California, on February 5, 1954. One of five children, he was born to Walter and Roberta McElroy. He grew up in San Mateo County. McElroy was educated at St. Joseph's High School Seminary, run by the Sulpician Fathers, and after graduating he entered Harvard University in 1972 to pursue education outside of the seminary system.

McElroy earned a B.A. in history from Harvard University in 1975 and an M.A. in American history from Stanford University in 1976. He returned to the seminary in fall 1976 and in 1979 graduated from St. Patrick's Seminary, where he earned a Master of Divinity degree. On April 12, 1980, McElroy was ordained to the priesthood by Archbishop John Raphael Quinn at St. Mary's Cathedral for the Archdiocese of San Francisco.

After ordination, McElroy pursued further advanced studies. In 1985, he obtained a Licentiate of Sacred Theology (STL) from the Jesuit School of Theology of Santa Clara University with a thesis entitled Freedom for Faith: John Courtney Murray and the Constitutional Question, 1942‍–‍1954. In 1986, he obtained a Doctor of Sacred Theology (STD) degree in moral theology from the Pontifical Gregorian University with a dissertation entitled John Courtney Murray and the Secular Crisis: Foundations for an American Catholic Public Theology. McElroy also received a Doctor of Political Science degree from Stanford in 1989 with a dissertation entitled Morality and American Foreign Policy: The Role of Moral Norms in International Affairs.

McElroy taught ethics at Saint Patrick's Seminary and University in Menlo Park, California, and was guest professor of social ethics at the University of San Francisco in the Fall of 2008.

== Priesthood ==
Once ordained in 1980, McElroy was assigned to a pastoral position in St. Cecilia Parish in San Francisco, California. From 1982 to 1985, McElroy served as secretary to Archbishop John Quinn. In 1983, McElroy was one of three priests who drafted a report for the archdiocesan Priests' Senate entitled "Ministry and Sexuality in the Archdiocese of San Francisco" that stated that "the homosexual orientation is not held to be a sinful condition" but called homosexual persons to "[live] out the demands of chastity within that orientation," endorsing a gradualist approach that "assists the person toward a progressive assimilation of the church's ethical values."

In a 1989 PBS segment on the AIDS epidemic, McElroy expressed opposition to LGBT relationships. He criticized San Francisco's recognition of LGBT couples as domestic partnerships, arguing that it destabilized traditional family structures. He stated, "It undermines the stability of the family. It is society saying 'we don't care whether you live together, or whether you are married and raise a family within the context of marriage.'"

From 1989 to 1995, he was parochial vicar at Saint Pius Church in Redwood City, California. In 1995, Archbishop Quinn appointed McElroy to be vicar general of the archdiocese, an office he held under Archbishop Quinn and Cardinal William Levada until 1997. In 1996, McElroy was made an honorary prelate by Pope John Paul II. From 1997 to 2010, McElroy served as the pastor of St. Gregory Church in San Mateo, California.

In 2005, McElroy published an essay on the denial of the Eucharist to public officials because of their political positions. He criticized those who adopt what he called the "sanctions position" for a lack of "pastoral solicitude", noted the expansion of grounds for sanctions from abortion to euthanasia and other issues by one diocese or another, questioned the lack of clarity as to what behavior triggers sanctions, and cited the occasions when John Paul II distributed the Eucharist to political leaders who favored legalized abortion. He proposed that the church's traditional "theology of scandal" should be invoked rather than employing Eucharistic practice as a means of discipline. He warned that imposing sanctions on individuals harms the church by appearing coercive, strengthens the argument of abortion advocates that the church is attempting to impose its religious beliefs on society at large, downplays the breadth of the church's social agenda, and tends to "cast the church as a partisan actor in the American political system."

== Episcopacy ==
=== Auxiliary Bishop of San Francisco ===
On July 6, 2010, McElroy was appointed an auxiliary bishop for the Archdiocese of San Francisco and titular bishop of Gemellae in Byzacena by Pope Benedict XVI. On September 7, 2010, McElroy received his episcopal consecration from Archbishop George Niederauer, with Archbishop Emeritus Quinn and Bishop John Wester serving as co-consecrators. As auxiliary bishop, McElroy was the archdiocesan vicar for parish life and development.

Writing in the Jesuit monthly magazine America in 2014, McElroy argued that the emphasis of Pope Francis on inequality in Catholic social teaching:

did not go over well with many American Catholics, who criticized his statement for being radical, simplistic, and confusing. This rebuff stands in stark and telling contrast to the otherwise enthusiastic reception the new pope has met with in the United States. From the moment of his election, Pope Francis has captured the attention of the American people with his message and manner, even as he has challenged us all to deep renewal and reform in our lives. Americans take heart in the pope's call to build an ecclesiastical culture that casts off judgmentalism; they applaud structural reforms at the Vatican; and they admire Francis's continuing focus on the pastoral needs of ordinary men and women.

=== Bishop of San Diego ===
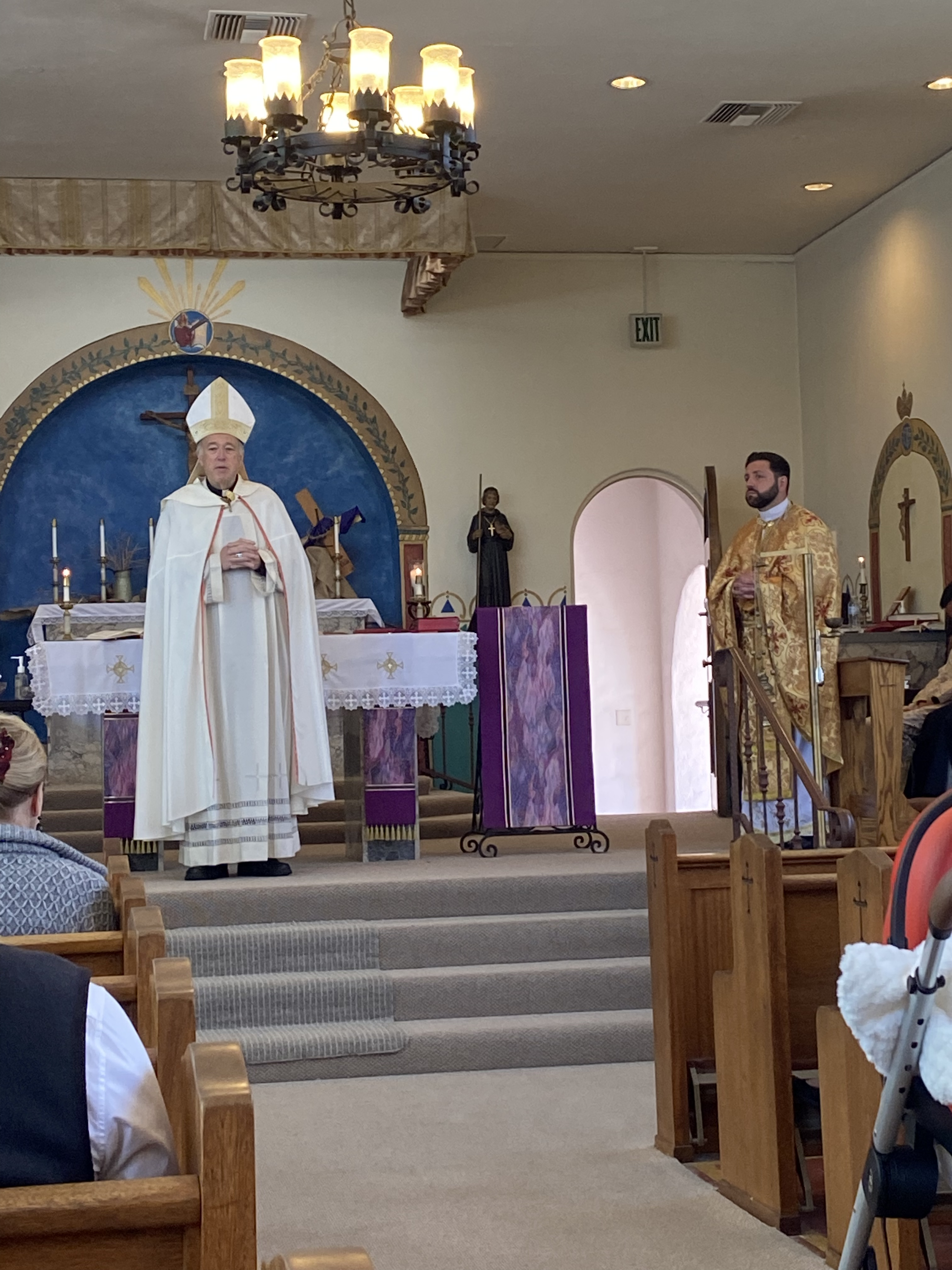
Bishop McElroy visiting the local Ukrainian Greek Catholic Community of San Diego in 2022

On March 3, 2015, McElroy was appointed the sixth Bishop of San Diego by Francis, succeeding the late Bishop Cirilo Flores. The diocese serves about one million Catholics in San Diego and Imperial counties. His installation took place on April 15, 2015, at St. Therese of Carmel Catholic Church.

McElroy is widely regarded as a supporter of the progressive policies of Francis. He has written frequently and extensively on social inequality and the Church's social justice mission. In his first public appearance in San Diego, he pledged to champion the cause of the homeless, to support comprehensive immigration reform, and to ban anyone who has abused minors from serving in the clergy or other employment in the diocese.

Balancing the need for just compensation for victims of sexual abuse and the need to continue the Church’s mission of education, pastoral service and outreach to the poor and the marginalized, it was determined under McElroy's leadership that Chapter 11 reorganization—bankruptcy for the second time—would be the best way forward for the Diocese in 2024.

In a discussion over the formation of the 2015 document "Forming Consciences for Faithful Citizenship" by the United States Conference of Catholic Bishops (USCCB), McElroy argued that the document focused excessively on abortion and euthanasia. He said that "alongside the issues of abortion and euthanasia, which are central issues in our effort to transform this world, poverty and the degradation of the earth are also central. But this document keeps to the structure of the world view of 2007. It tilts in favor of abortion and euthanasia and excludes poverty and the environment." He called for the document to be scrapped entirely. His comments were reported to have visibly irritated Cardinal Daniel DiNardo, who was then serving as vice president of the USCCB and who later became its president. In a speech delivered on February 17, 2016, McElroy called on Catholics "to recognize and confront the ugly tide of anti-Islamic bigotry" in the United States. He denounced as "repeated falsehoods" claims that Islam is a violent religion and compared these allegations to 19th century anti-Catholicism in America.

McElroy is currently the vice-president of the California Catholic Conference and serves at the USCCB on the administrative committee, the ecumenical committee, the committee on domestic justice and the committee on international affairs. In 2017 he preached at the vigil the night before the funeral Mass of Archbishop Quinn.

McElroy, like most members of the Church hierarchy, including Pope Francis and the USCCB, opposed plans by U.S. President Donald Trump to build a wall along the Mexico–United States border to limit illegal immigration. In March 2018, Trump visited California to view prototypes for the wall. After the visit, McElroy said,

"It is a sad day for our country when we trade the majestic, hope-filled symbolism of the Statue of Liberty for an ineffective and grotesque wall, which both displays and inflames the ethnic and cultural divisions that have long been the underside of our national history."

At a 2018 meeting, McElroy was asked by several lay Catholics about an openly gay man, Aaron Bianco, who was working at St. John the Evangelist Parish. In response to one of their questions, McElroy said, "If the Church eliminated all the employees who are not living out the teachings of the Church in its fullness, we would be employing only angels."

In 2020, three weeks prior to the US presidential election, McElroy criticized those questioning Biden's personal Catholic faith based on his positions on abortion, characterizing "the public denial of candidates' identity as Catholics because of a specific policy position they have taken" as "an assault on the meaning of what it is to be Catholic." McElroy said that although acts of abortion are intrinsically evil, legislation about it is a matter of prudential judgement, though he noted that the commitment to reducing the numbers of abortions that occur "has been eviscerated in the Democratic Party in a capitulation to notions of privacy that simply block out the human identity and rights of unborn children." McElroy stated that Catholic identity does not stand or fall on a single policy position. Catholic social teaching and identity encompasses such things as solidarity, compassion, love for the church, and "having a grace-filled relationship with God".

On May 29, 2022, Francis announced his intention to make McElroy a cardinal. On August 27, 2022, Pope Francis made him a Cardinal-Priest of San Frumenzio ai Prati Fiscali.

In September 2024, McElroy issued a policy that banned homeschool co-op groups from using parochial facilities within the diocese, claiming that it "undermined the stability of nearby Catholic schools and lead people to think that the Church is approving and advancing particular alternative schools and programs." Some criticised this decision, due to it allowing parishes to rent space to non-Catholic schools on a "case-by-case basis".

On Sunday morning, February 9, 2025, McElroy led a protest against Donald Trump's anti-immigration policies. The predominantly Latino congregation marched downtown, ending with an afternoon vigil at St. Joseph Cathedral where every pew was filled.

==== McCarrick affair ====
In 2016, McElroy had two meetings with psychotherapist and clerical sex abuse expert Richard Sipe, during which Sipe made allegations about current and former bishops. McElroy had asked Sipe for any corroborating material to substantiate his allegations. McElroy later stated, "I asked if he could share this information with me, especially since some of his accusations involved persons still active in the life of the Church. Dr. Sipe said that he was precluded from sharing specific documentary information that corroborated his claims." Subsequently, Sipe had a letter discussing alleged sexual misconduct by retired Cardinal Theodore McCarrick and other clerics, disguised as a major donation, hand-delivered to McElroy's office by a process server. In addition to delivering the letter to McElroy, Sipe published the letter publicly on his website.

A wide variety of allegations of sexual assault against adults and minors against McCarrick became public knowledge in June 2018 after an allegation of sex abuse of a minor was deemed credible by the Vatican. Subsequently, McElroy released a statement in which he acknowledged meeting with Sipe and receiving his letter, but stated that "After I read [the letter], I wrote to Dr. Sipe and told him that his decision to engage a process server who operated under false pretenses, and his decision to copy his letter to me to a wide audience, made further conversations at a level of trust impossible." McElroy further stated that:

"Dr. Sipe made many significant contributions to understanding the dimensions of clergy sexual abuse in the United States and to the assistance of victims. But the limitations on his willingness to share corroborating information made it impossible to know what was real and what was rumor."

A 2018 article in America reported that "[McElroy] said that the material he received from Mr. Sipe was passed on to the proper governing bodies in Rome."

=== Position on LGBT issues ===
In America, McElroy called for a change in sacramental discipline related to the reception of communion by sexually active LGBT people. He emphasized "the privileged place" of conscience and that sexual activity does not lie at the heart of the hierarchy of truths. He also said: "The distinction between orientation and activity cannot be the principal focus for such a pastoral embrace because it inevitably suggests dividing the L.G.B.T. community into those who refrain from sexual activity and those who do not."

In a February 2024 speech, McElroy said that much of the opposition to Fiducia Supplicans was based on "enduring animus" against gays and lesbians. He said further that Fiducia Supplicans was part of a "move toward decentralization" in the Catholic Church. He added "We have witnessed the reality that bishops of various parts of the world have made rapidly divergent decisions about the acceptability of such blessings in their countries".

=== Archbishop of Washington (DC) ===
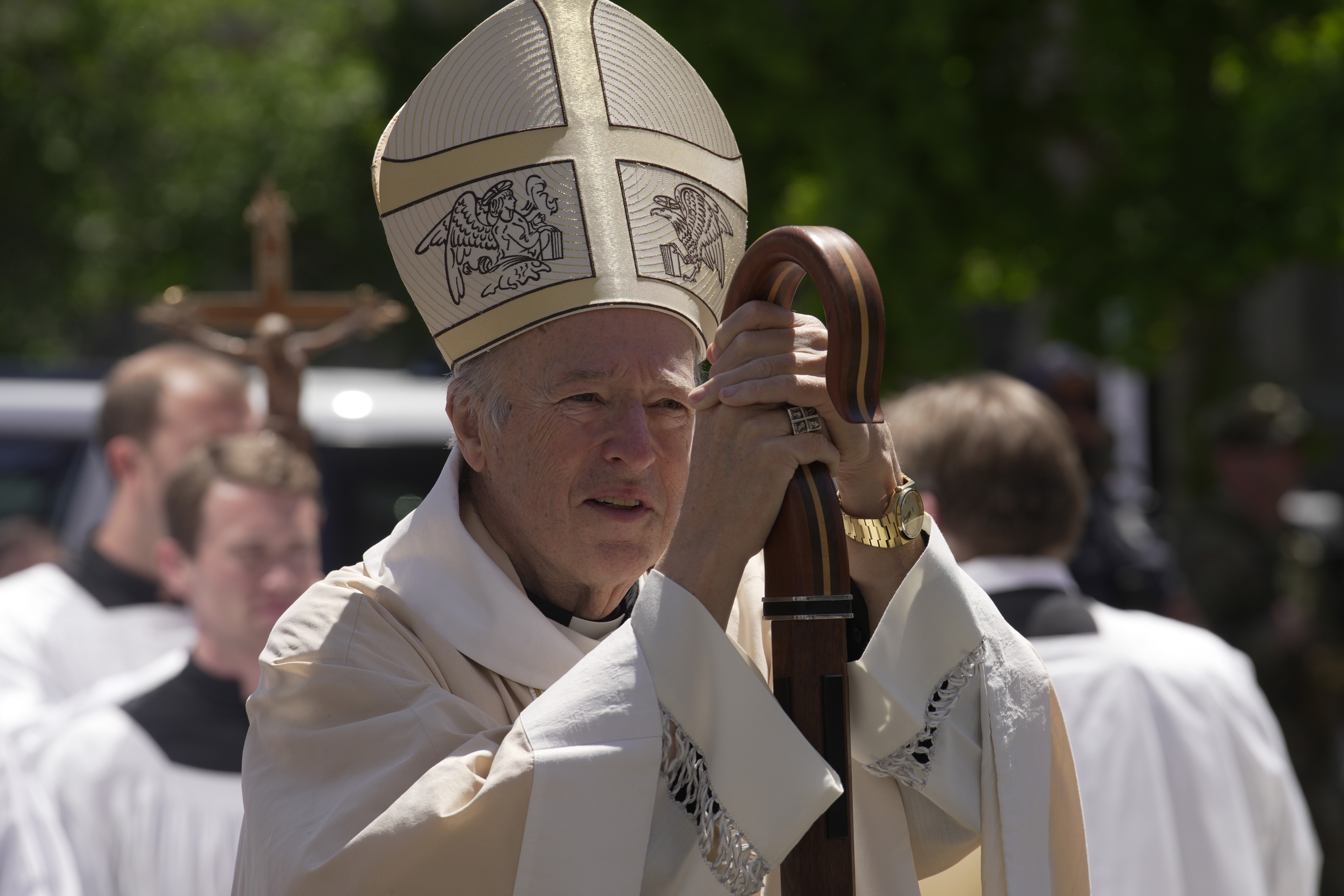
Robert W. McElroy stands outside St. Patrick Catholic Church prior to the 32nd Blue Mass in Washington, DC, May 5, 2026.

On January 6, 2025, Pope Francis appointed McElroy to succeed Wilton Gregory as Archbishop of Washington, DC. He was installed March 11, 2025.

McElroy participated in the 2025 papal conclave as one of the cardinal electors that elected Pope Leo XIV.

== Publications ==
McElroy published two books as a priest, related to his dissertations at the Pontifical Gregorian University and Stanford.

- The Search for an American Public Theology: The Contribution of John Courtney Murray (Paulist Press, 1989)
- Morality and American Foreign Policy: The Role of Ethics in International Affairs (Princeton University Press, 1992)

He has also written four articles for America magazine.

== See also ==
- Cardinals created by Pope Francis
- Catholic Church hierarchy
- Catholic Church in the United States
- Historical list of the Catholic bishops of the United States
- List of Catholic bishops of the United States
- Lists of patriarchs, archbishops, and bishops

Catholic Church titles
Preceded by –	Auxiliary Bishop of San Francisco; 2010‍–‍2015	Succeeded by –
Preceded by Wilson Tadeu Jönck	— TITULAR — Bishop of Gemellae in Byzacena; 2010‍–‍2015	Succeeded by Donatien Bafuidinsoni Maloko-Mana
Preceded by Cirilo Flores	Bishop of San Diego; 2015‍–‍2025	Succeeded by Michael Pham
Preceded by Alexandre José Maria dos Santos	Cardinal Priest of San Frumenzio ai Prati Fiscali; 2022‍–‍present	Incumbent
Preceded by Wilton Daniel Gregory	Archbishop of Washington; 2025‍–‍present	Incumbent
