= Roman Catholic Diocese of San Diego =

Latin Catholic ecclesiastical jurisdiction in California, US

Coordinates: 32.7667°N 117.1330°W

Diocese of San Diego Dioecesis Sancti Didaci Diócesis de San Diego
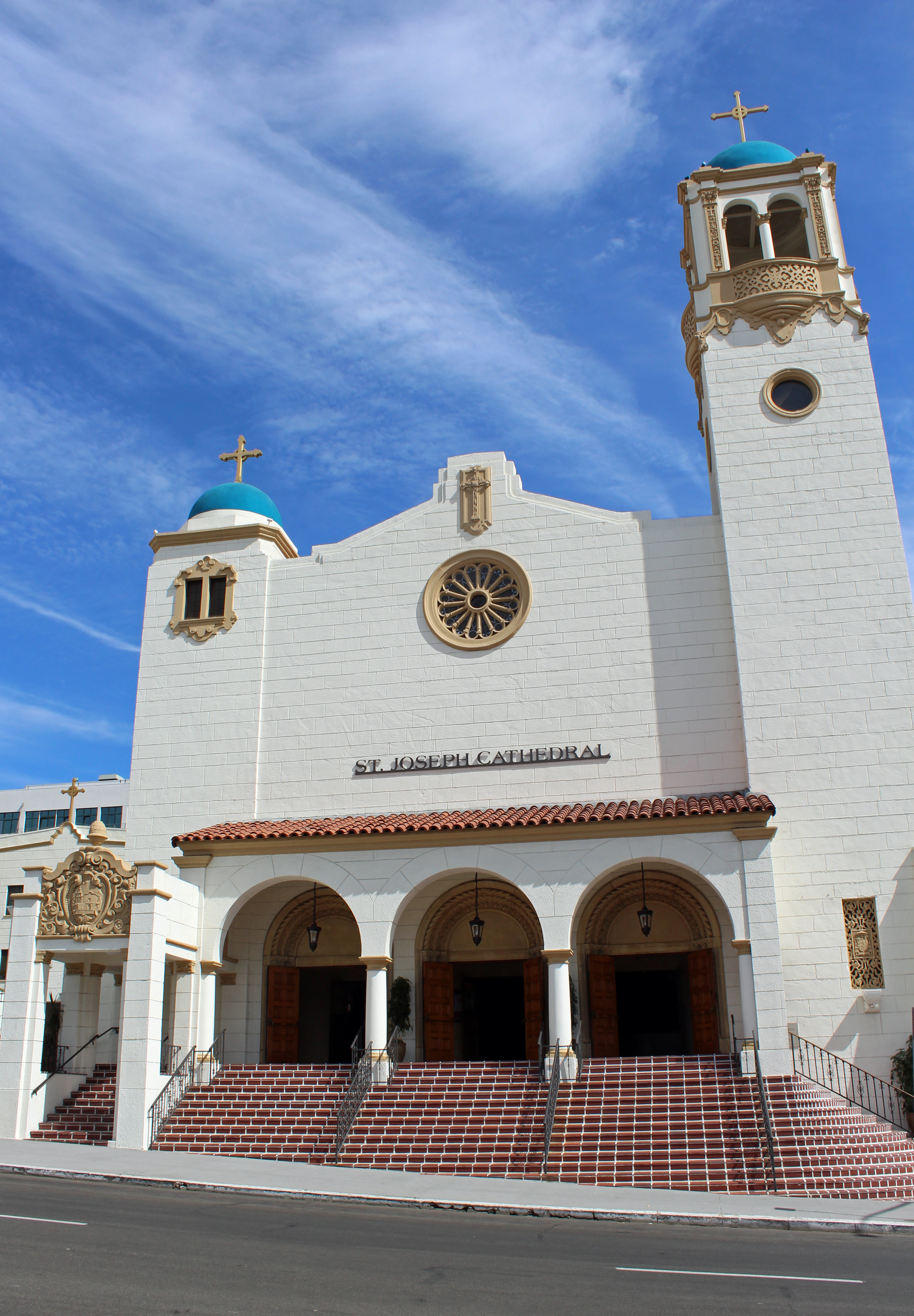
- St. Joseph Cathedral

- Coat of arms

Location
- Country: United States
- Territory: Counties of San Diego, Imperial
- Ecclesiastical province: Province of Los Angeles

Statistics
- Population: Total; Catholics: (as of 2017); 3,484,311; 1,391,278 (39.9%)
- Parishes: 98
- Schools: 89

Information
- Denomination: Catholic
- Sui iuris church: Latin Church
- Rite: Roman Rite
- Established: July 11, 1936
- Cathedral: St. Joseph Cathedral
- Patron saint: St. Didacus of Alcalá

Current leadership
- Pope: Leo XIV
- Bishop: Michael Pham
- Metropolitan Archbishop: José Gómez
- Auxiliary Bishops: Felipe Pulido

Map
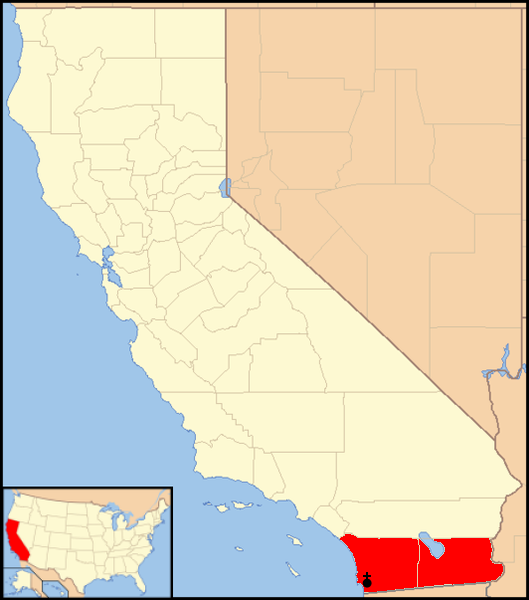

Website
- sdcatholic.org

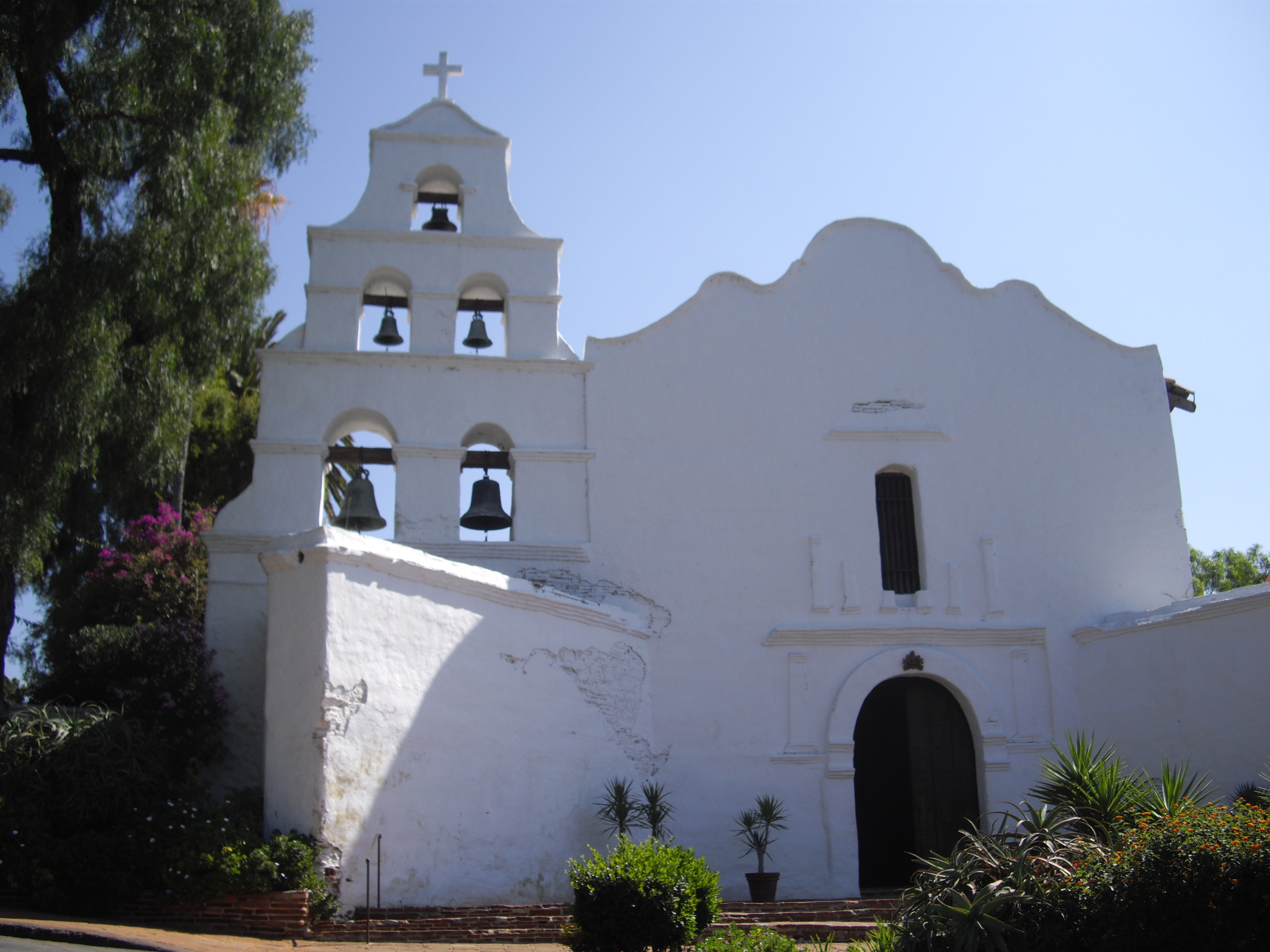
Mission San Diego de Alcalá, San Diego, California (2008)

The Diocese of San Diego (Latin: Dioecesis Sancti Didaci) is a diocese of the Catholic Church in Southern California, United States. Its ecclesiastical territory includes all of San Diego and Imperial counties. It is a suffragan diocese of the Archdiocese of Los Angeles. Its mother church is St. Joseph Cathedral in San Diego; the bishop is Michael Pham.

== History ==
=== 1700 to 1840 ===
During the 18th century, all of California was a Spanish colony, part of the province of Las Californias in the Spanish Viceroyalty of New Spain. The first Catholic churches in what became the Diocese of San Diego were two Spanish California missions:

- Mission San Diego de Alcalá – founded in 1769 by the missionary Junipero Serra in present-day San Diego.
- Mission San Luis Rey de Francia – established in present-day Oceanside by the priest Fermín de Lasuén in 1798.

In 1804, the Spanish split Las Californias into two provinces:

- Alta California (Upper California) This included the modern American states of California, Nevada, Arizona, and Utah, along with western Colorado and southwestern Wyoming.
- Baja California Territory (Lower California). This consisted of the modern Mexican states of Baja California and Baja California Sur.

After the Mexican War of Independence ended in 1821, Spain ceded Alta California and Baja California to the new nation of Mexico. The Mexican Government in 1835 secularized all the Catholic missions in its territories, including the Mission San Luis Rey and Mission San Diego. The vast landholdings of the missions were confiscated and a clergy exodus took place.

=== 1840 to 1936 ===
In 1840, Pope Gregory XVI set up the Diocese of California. The new diocese included both Alta California and Baja California. Gregory XVI set the episcopal see at San Diego in Alta California. The first bishop of the new diocese was Francisco Garcia Diego y Moreno. Moreno designated the Mission Santa Barbara in Santa Barbara as his pro-cathedral.

In 1848, Mexico ceded Alta California to the United States at the close of the Mexican–American War. The government of Mexico then complained to the Vatican about San Diego, now an American city, having jurisdiction over the Mexican parishes in Baja California. In response, the Vatican in 1849 divided the Diocese of California:

- Baja California became a Mexican jurisdiction
- Alta California became the Diocese of Monterey. The Vatican moved the see city from San Diego to Monterey because it was move centrally located. The Royal Presidio Chapel in Monterey became the cathedral of the new American diocese.

In 1859, Pius IX renamed the Diocese of Monterey as the Diocese of Monterey-Los Angeles to recognize the growth of Los Angeles; the see was transferred to Los Angeles in 1876. Mary, Star of the Sea was the first parish in La Jolla, established in 1909

St. Mary's Church, considered the first in the Imperial Valley, was established in 1907 in El Centro. The first Catholic church in Chula Vista, St. Rose of Lima, was erected in 1921.In 1922, the Vatican divided the Diocese of Monterey-Los Angeles, with the southern portion becoming the Diocese of Los Angeles-San Diego.

The Sisters of Nazareth in 1924 opened the Orphanage in Mission Valley. Today it is the Nazareth School.

=== 1936 to 1969 ===
The Diocese of San Diego was erected on July 11, 1936, by Pope Pius XI, taking San Diego, Imperial, Riverside, and San Bernardino Counties from the new Archdiocese of Los Angeles. The pope named Charles F. Buddy as the first bishop of San Diego. The first Catholic church in Carlsbad, St. Patrick's, was dedicated in 1943.

Buddy was close friends with Auxiliary Bishop William O'Brien, director of the Catholic Church Extension Society of Chicago. The Society donated money to the new diocese for the construction of churches and the financial support of priests. Buddy co-founded the University of San Diego in 1949, serving as its first president from 1950 to 1966. Pope Paul VI appointed Auxiliary Bishop Francis Furey from the Archdiocese of Philadelphia as coadjutor bishop of San Diego in 1963 to assist Buddy.

After Buddy died in 1966, Furey automatically succeed him as bishop of San Diego. Three years later, in 1969, Furey became archbishop of the Archdiocese of San Antonio. To replace Furey in San Diego, Paul VI that same year appointed Bishop Leo Maher from the Diocese of Santa Rosa.

=== 1969 to 1990 ===
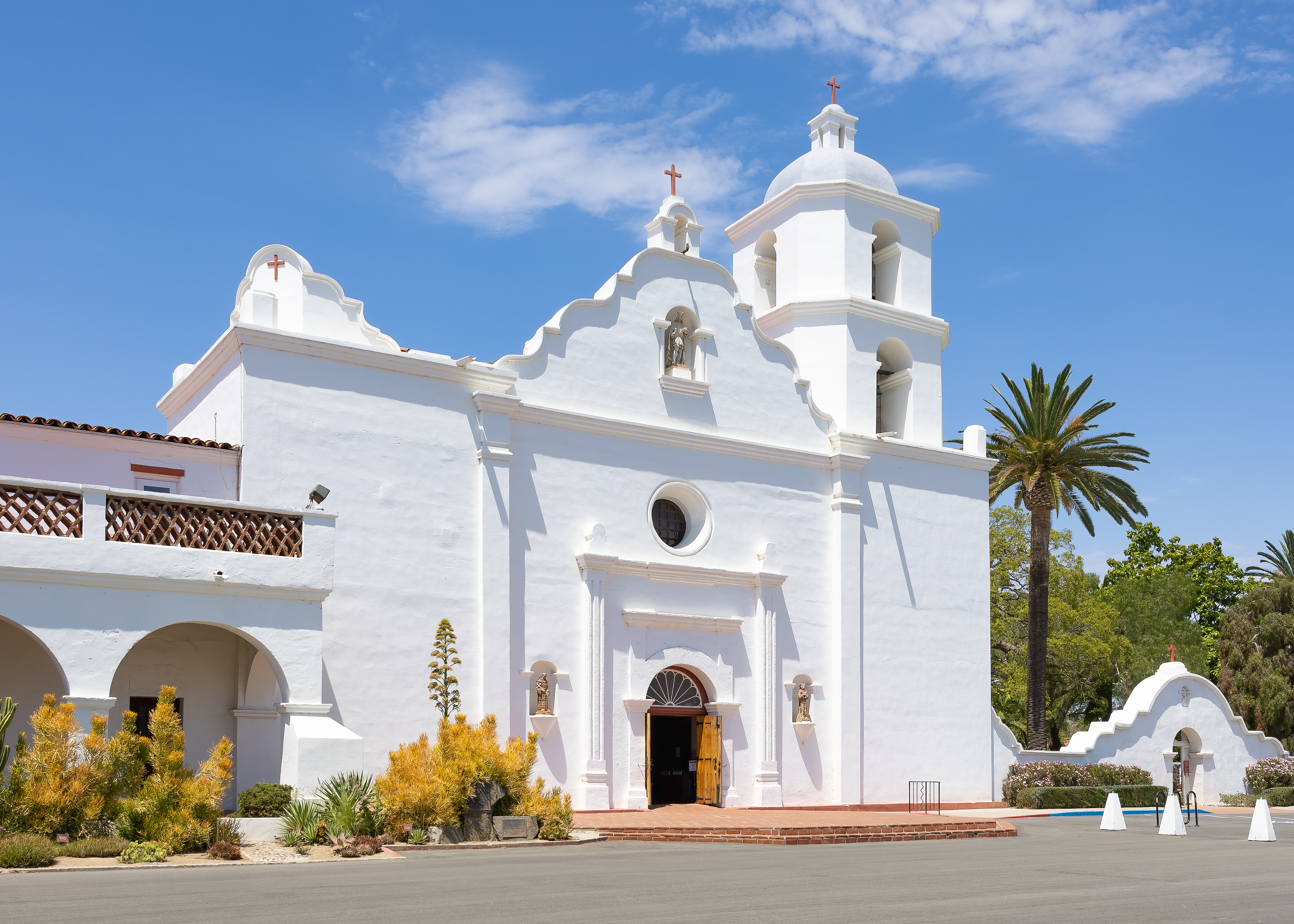
Misión San Luis Rey de Francia, Oceanside, California (2022)

At the time of Maher's arrival, the diocese was about $15 million in debt, which Maher fully retired by 1980. He presided over the second diocesan synod from 1973 to 1976, revising the statutes and guidelines of the diocese to implement the reforms of the Second Vatican Council of the early 1960s. In 1976, Maher created the first diocesan pastoral council. He ended the official relationship between the diocese and the University of San Diego, establishing the school as a separate corporation.

Priest Edward Rodrigue was removed from the ministry and sent to 11 months of treatment at a center after he pleaded no contest in 1979 to sexually abusing an 11-year-old developmentally disabled minor in Highland. He was laicized in 1992. After admitting to sexually abusing dozens of minors during his priesthood, he was sentenced to 10 years in prison in 1998. By the end of 2004, 15 men had sued the diocese, claiming Rodrigue had abused them.

Maher was a strong supporter of the ecumenical movement, co-founding the San Diego County Ecumenical Conference and issuing joint statements on morality with non-Catholic religious leaders. He also supported workers' rights to organize into unions, but pledged an official neutrality in a farm labor dispute in 1971. That same year, he suspended Victor Salandini, a San Diego priest and ally of labor organizer César Chávez, for wearing a serape with the black eagle symbol of the United Farm Workers instead of proper vestments and for using corn tortillas instead of sacramental bread during Masses. In 1975, Maher prohibited Catholics who are members of abortion legalization advocacy organizations from receiving communion or serving as lectors, specifically citing the National Organization for Women for its "shameless agitation."

In 1978, Pope John Paul II erected the Diocese of San Bernardino, removing Riverside and San Bernardino Counties from the Diocese of San Diego. In 1980, Maher issued a public condemnation of the Ku Klux Klan, saying that knowingly voting for a racist or a Klan member may constitute a sin. He prohibited priests from celebrating Mass for Dignity, a pro-LGBTQ+ Catholic organization; he once celebrated a Mass himself for HIV/AIDS patients at St. Joseph's Cathedral. In 1989, John Paul II appointed Bishop Robert Brom from the Diocese of Duluth as coadjutor bishop.

=== 1990 to present ===
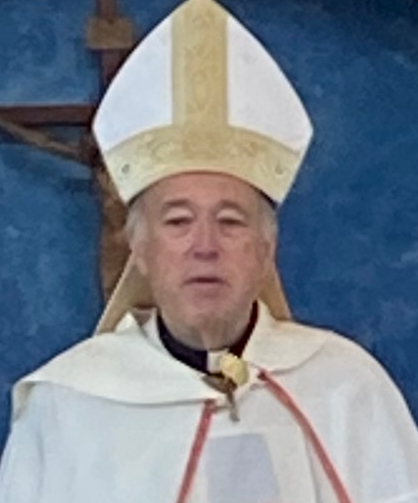
Bishop McElroy (2022)

After Maher retired in 1990, Brom succeeded him as bishop of San Diego. Brom helped found two Catholic high schools:

- Mater Dei Catholic High School in Chula Vista, replacing Marian Catholic High School in Imperial Beach
- Cathedral Catholic High School in Carmel Valley, replacing University of San Diego High School in Linda Vista

In February 2007, the diocese filed for bankruptcy protection after it was unable to reach a financial settlement with numerous plaintiffs suing over sexual abuse by clergy. In September 2007, the diocese agreed to pay $198.1 million to settle 144 claims, the second-largest settlement payment by a Catholic diocese in American history. The accused included 48 priests and one lay coordinator of altar boys.

Brom also created a pastoral center in San Diego after selling the former chancery building to the University of San Diego. In 2012, Pope Benedict XVI named Auxiliary Bishop Cirilo Flores from the Diocese of Orange as coadjutor bishop in San Diego. When Brom retired in 2013, Flores became the next bishop of San Diego, but he died from a stroke and cancer in September 2014.

In March 2015, Pope Francis appointed Auxiliary Bishop Robert McElroy from the Archdiocese of San Francisco as bishop of San Diego. In September 2018, the diocese added eight more names to its list of clergy with credible abuse accusations. In December 2018, a pastor, Juan Garcia Castillo, was sentenced to 60 years in jail and three years of probation, after an adult seminarian had accused Castillo of sexually assaulting him. In 2019, the Diocese of San Diego and five other California dioceses established a fund for clergy sexual abuse victims; by September 2021, the program had paid $24 million in claims. In May 2022, Pope Francis created McElroy as a cardinal. The diocese declared Chapter 11 bankruptcy for the second time since 2007 on June 17, 2024.

In January 2025, McElroy was named Archbishop of Washington by Francis. In May 2025, Pope Leo XIV appointed Auxiliary Bishop Michael Pham of San Diego to succeed McElroy. Pham was Leo XIV's first episcopal appointment for the United States and the first Vietnamese-American to head a diocese.

In June 2025, Pham authored a joint letter with his Auxiliary Bishops Ramon Bejarano and Felipe Pulido announcing that a group of clergy and faith leaders would block the detaining of immigrants at the Edward J. Schwartz U.S. Courthouse in San Diego on June 20th, World Refugee Day. On that day, Pham led a dozen religious leaders who stopped United States Immigration and Customs Enforcement (ICE) and United States Border Patrol agents from detaining immigrants.

== Statistics ==
In 2023, the Diocese of San Diego counted 96 parishes and 14 missions, serving a Catholic population of 1,386,368 in San Diego County and Imperial County. The diocese had 130 active priests and 60 retired priests, along with 122 permanent deacons, 163 religious sisters and 29 religious brothers.

== Bishops ==
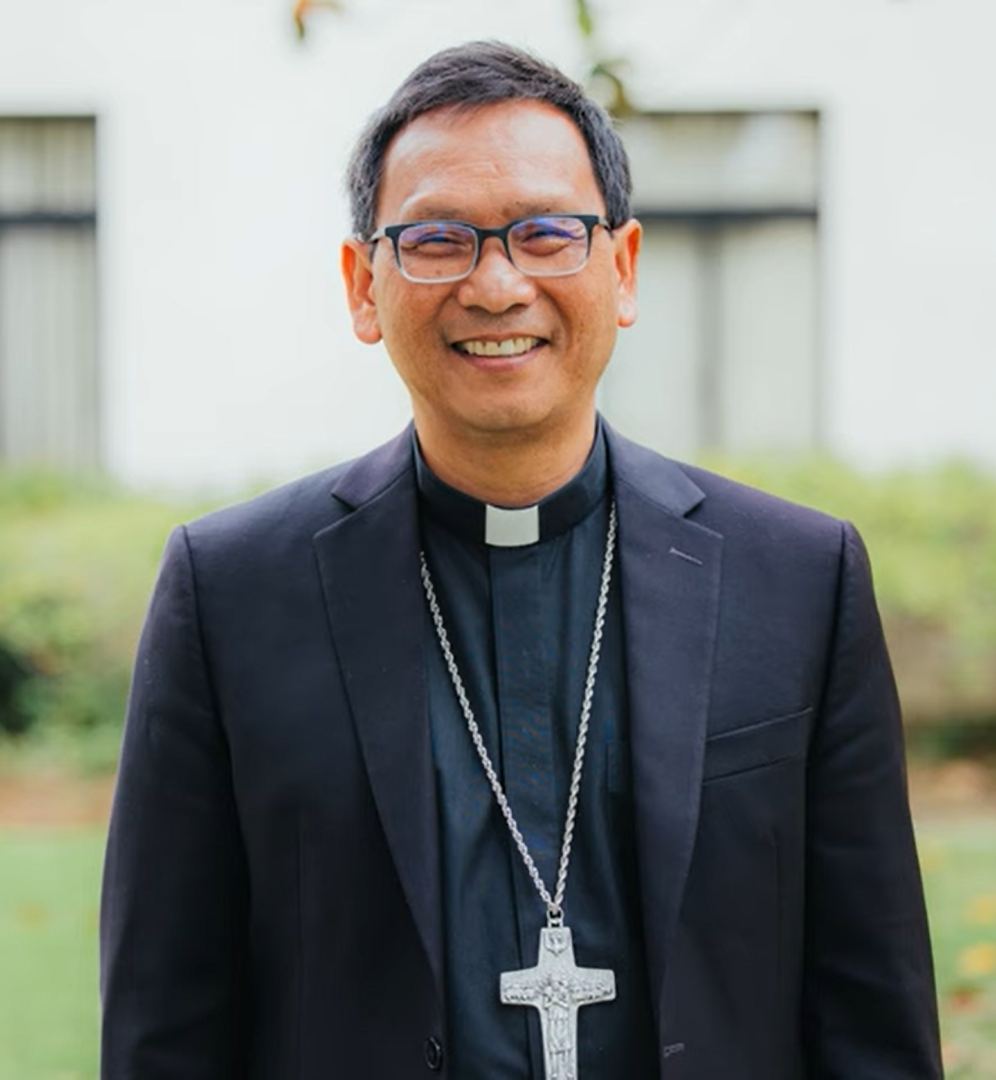
Bishop Pham (2024)

=== Bishops of San Diego ===
1. Charles Francis Buddy (1936–1966)
2. Francis James Furey (1966–1969, coadjutor bishop 1963–1966), appointed Archbishop of San Antonio
3. Leo Thomas Maher (1969–1990)
4. Robert Henry Brom (1990–2013, coadjutor bishop 1989–1990)
5. Cirilo Flores (2013–2014, coadjutor bishop 2012–2013)
6. Cardinal Robert W. McElroy (2015–2025), appointed Archbishop of Washington, DC
7. Michael Pham (2025–present)

=== Auxiliary bishops ===
- Richard Henry Ackerman, C.S.Sp. (1956–1960), appointed Bishop of Covington
- John R. Quinn (1967–1971), appointed Bishop of Oklahoma City-Tulsa and later Archbishop of Oklahoma City and Archbishop of San Francisco
- Gilbert Espinosa Chávez (1974–2007)
- Salvatore J. Cordileone (2002–2009), appointed Bishop of Oakland and later Archbishop of San Francisco
- John P. Dolan (2017–2022) appointed Bishop of Phoenix
- Ramon Bejarano (2020–2025), appointed Bishop of Monterey
- Michael Phạm (2023–2025), appointed bishop of this diocese
- Felipe Pulido (2023–present)

=== Other priest of this diocese who became bishop ===
Phillip Francis Straling, appointed Bishop of San Bernardino in 1978

== Education ==
As of 2026, the Diocese of San Diego had an enrollment of approximately 15,000 students in 31 pre-schools, 40 elementary schools, and seven high schools.

=== High schools ===
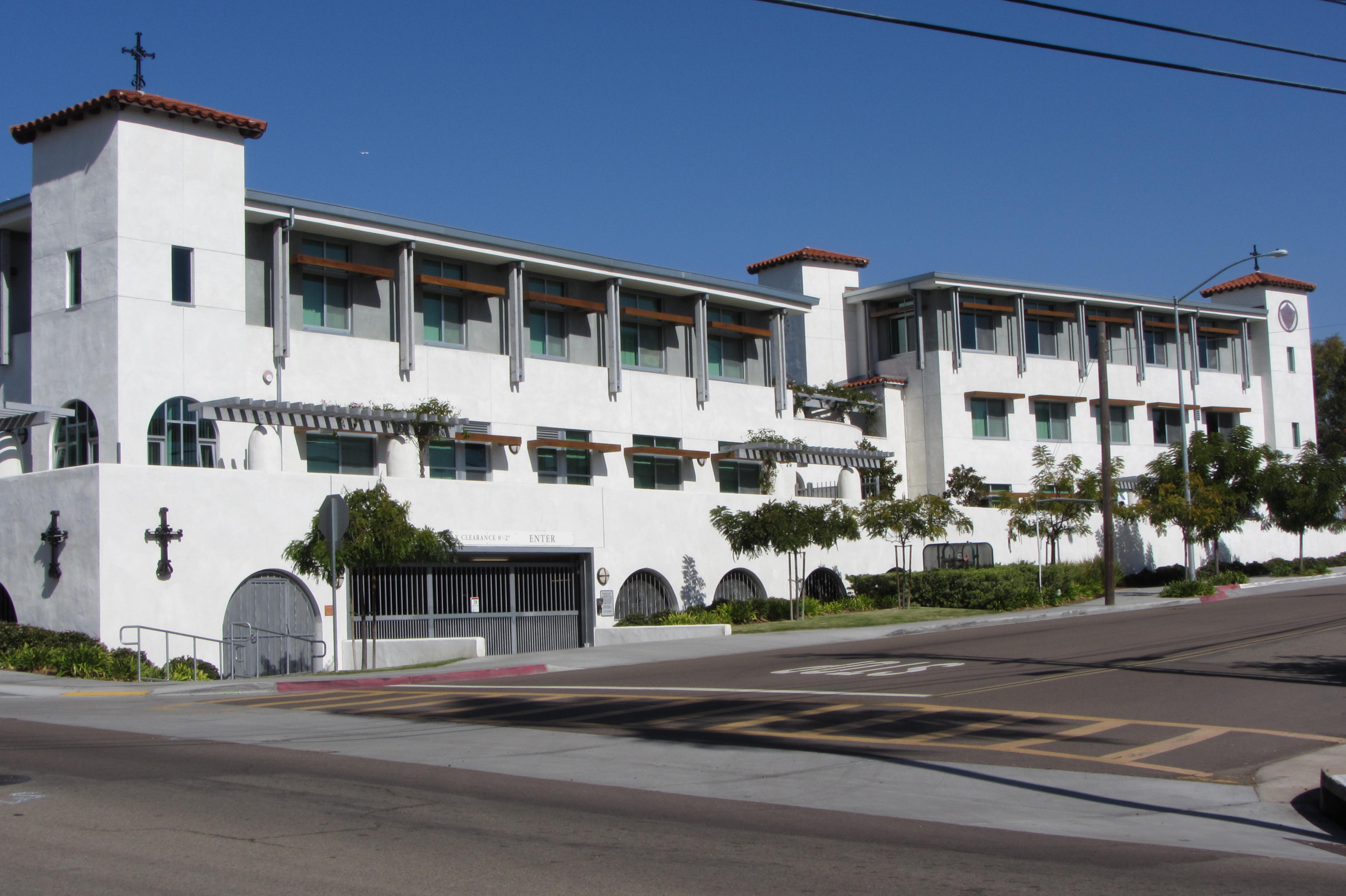
St. Augustine High School (2011)

- Academy of Our Lady of Peace – Normal Heights, San Diego. It is administered by the Sisters of St. Joseph of Carondelet, and is the oldest high school in San Diego (1882)
- Cathedral Catholic High School – Carmel Valley, San Diego. Founded in 1939 as Cathedral Girls High School, became coed in 1970 and renamed as Cathedral Catholic High School in 2005.
- Christo Rey San Diego High School – San Diego. Founded in 2020, operated in partnership with the Congregation of Jesus and Mary
- Mater Dei Catholic High School – Chula Vista. It replaced Marian Catholic High School in 2007.
- St. Augustine High School – North Park, San Diego. It is administered by the Augustinians.
- Vincent Memorial Catholic High School – Calexico
