= St. Joseph Cathedral (San Diego, California) =

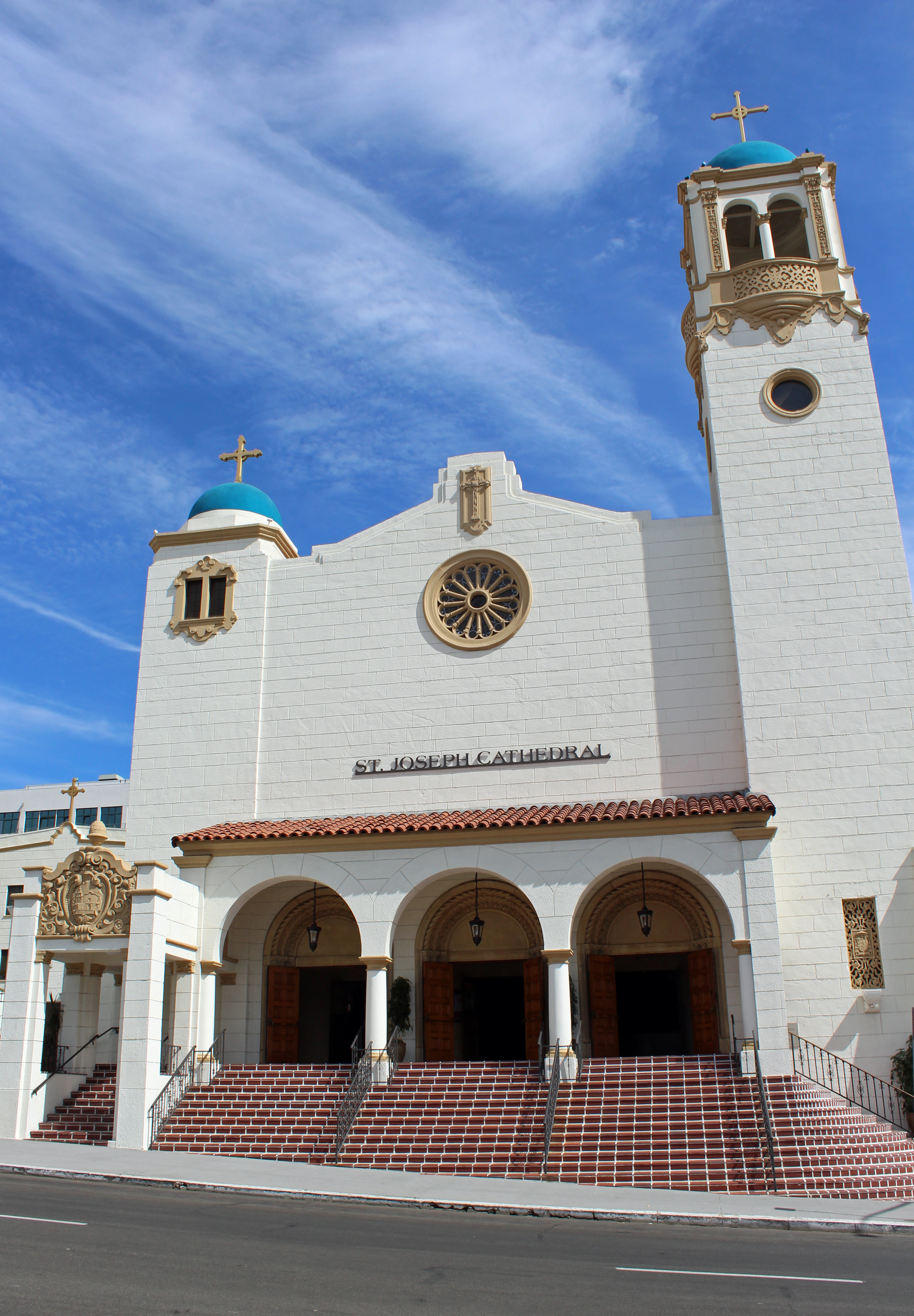

- St. Joseph Cathedral's location in Southern California
- 32°43′16″N 117°09′42″W
- Location: 1535 Third Avenue; San Diego, California
- Country: United States
- Denomination: Catholic Church
- Sui iuris church: Latin Church
- Website: www.sdcathedral.org

History
- Founded: 1874

Architecture
- Architectural type: Mission Revival
- Completed: 1941

Administration
- Diocese: San Diego

Clergy
- Bishop: Most Rev. Michael Pham
- Pastor: Rev. Peter Navarra

St. Joseph Cathedral is a Catholic cathedral in the Cortez Hill neighborhood of San Diego, California, in the United States. It is the seat of the Diocese of San Diego.

The first St. Joseph's Church was dedicated in 1875. It was replaced by a second larger church in 1894. St. Joseph's Church was dedicated as a cathedral in 1936; a fire destroyed it in 1937. The new St. Joseph's Cathedral was dedicated in 1941.

== History ==
=== St. Joseph's Church ===
During the middle of the 19th century, the Catholics in the San Diego area were part of the Diocese of Monterey-Los Angeles; the Mission San Diego de Alcalá was the first parish in San Diego.

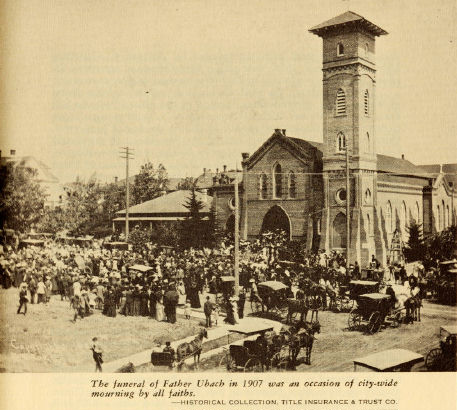
Funeral of Reverend Ubach at the second St. Joseph's Church (1907)

The diocese erected St. Joseph Parish in 1874, with Reverend Antonio Ubach assigned as its first pastor. It was the third parish in the community. The real estate developer Alonzo Horton donated a plot of land on Third Avenue and Beech Street to the parish to build a church. The first St. Joseph Church, a wooden structure, was dedicated by Bishop Francis Mora. in 1875.The parish was reportedly so poor that the priests were forced to sleep on the floor in their residence.

In 1894, the parish completed and dedicated the second St. Joseph's Church, a brick building located on the property of the first church. The church was ravaged by a fire in 1903. The parish started a grammar school in 1925.

=== St. Joseph's Cathedral ===
When the Vatican erected the Diocese of San Diego in 1936, St. Joseph Church became the first St Joseph Cathedral.St. Joseph's Cathedral suffered severe fire damage in 1937. At that time, the diocese decided to build a new, larger cathedral on the same site. The St. Joseph Cathedral high school for girls was opened by the Sisters of St. Joseph of Orange and the Sisters of St. Joseph of Carondelet in 1939.

The Second St. Joseph's Cathedral was dedicated by Bishop Charles. F. Buddy in 1941. The girls high school in 1970 was merged into the new University of San Diego High School.

St. Joseph underwent restoration work in 2011 which included repainting and restoring exterior wood and concrete. Earlier work upgraded restrooms and accessibility to the facility.

== Present day ==
St. Joseph's Cathedral offers public liturgies every day of the week, including a Sunday mass in Spanish. A young adult ministry, confessions, and devotions are also available.

The cathedral frequently hosted concerts by Orchestra Nova San Diego and other classical groups.

Cathedral images

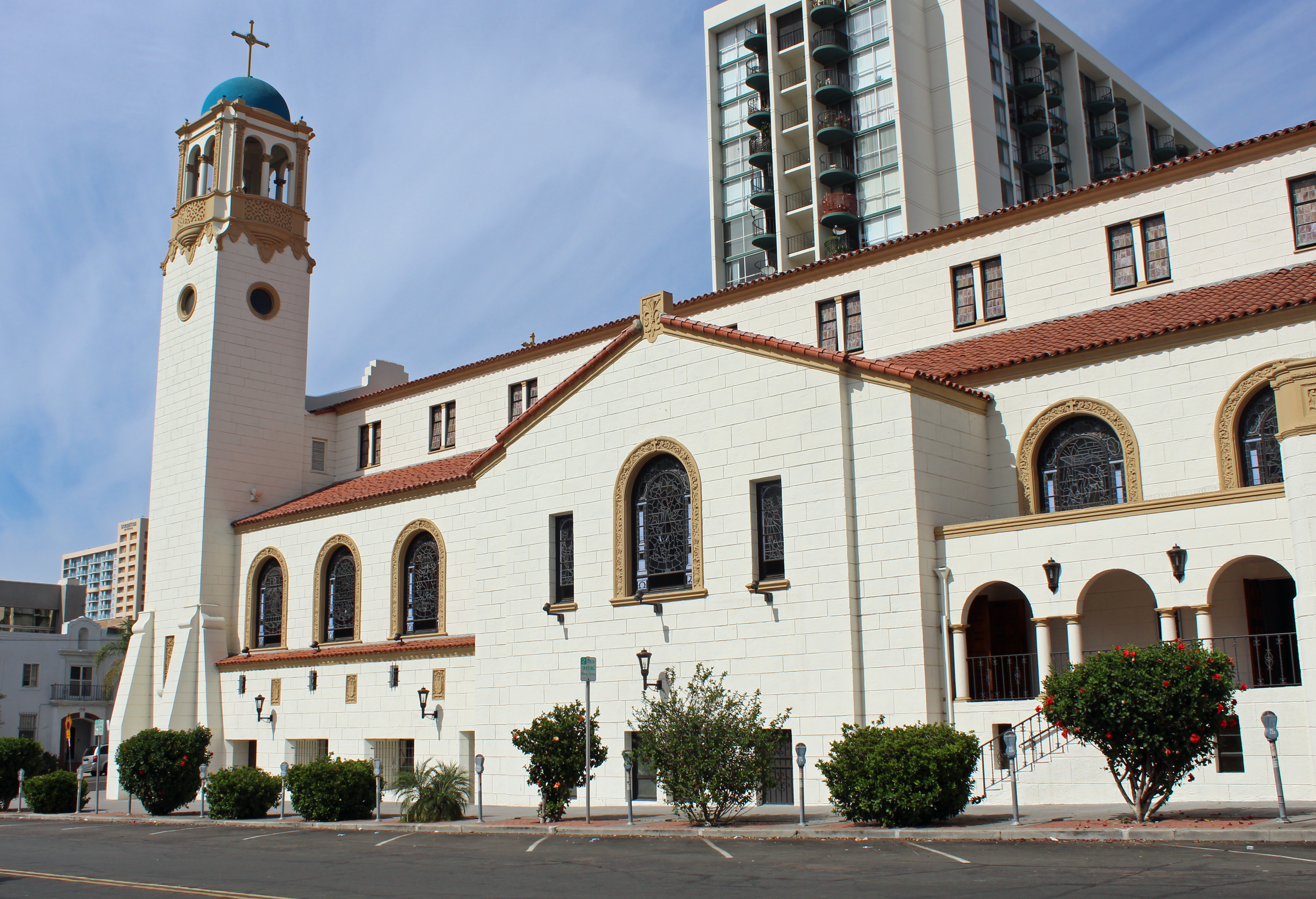
Exterior, St. Joseph's Cathedral (2012)

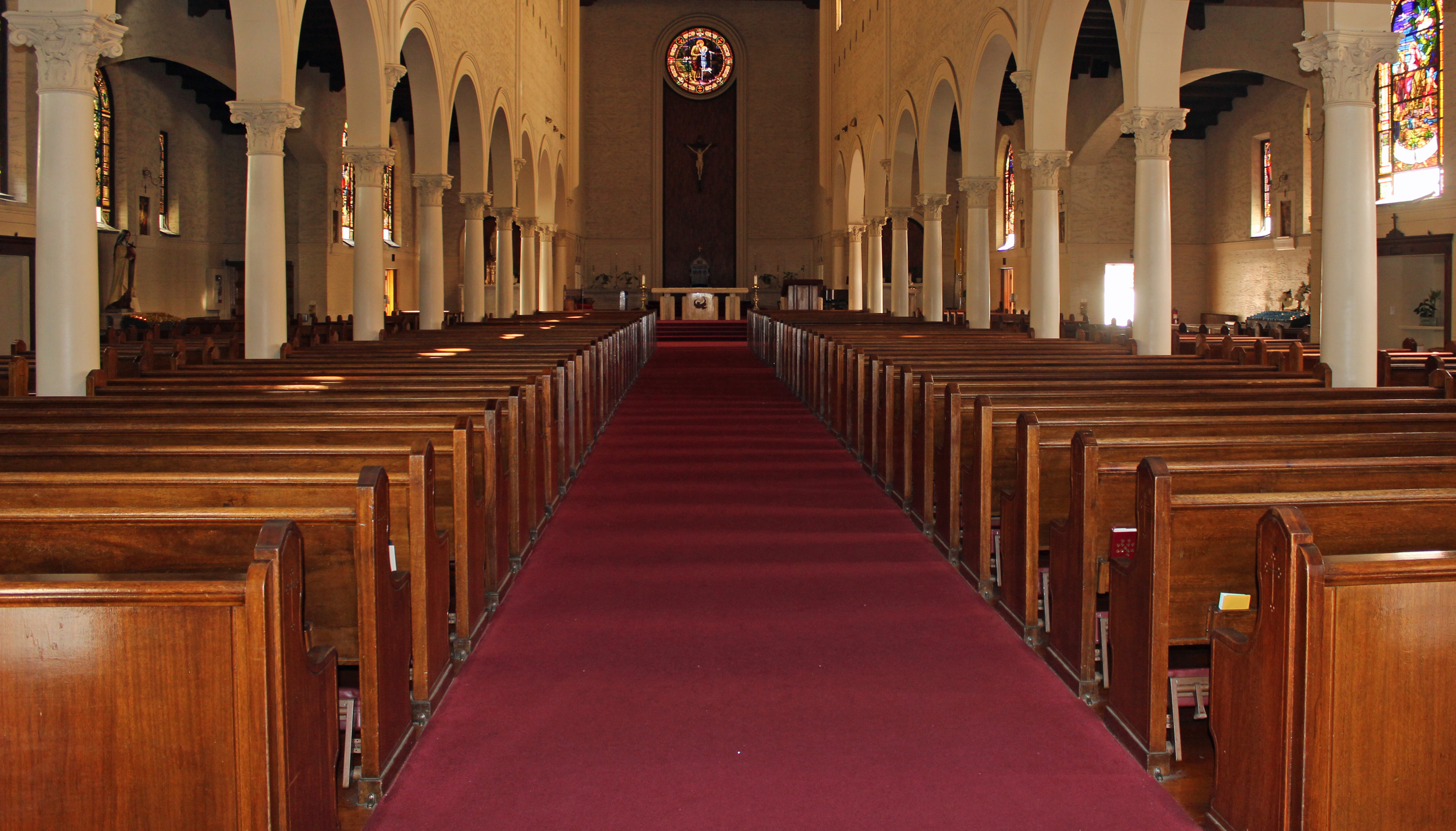
Interior, St. Joseph's Cathedral (2012)

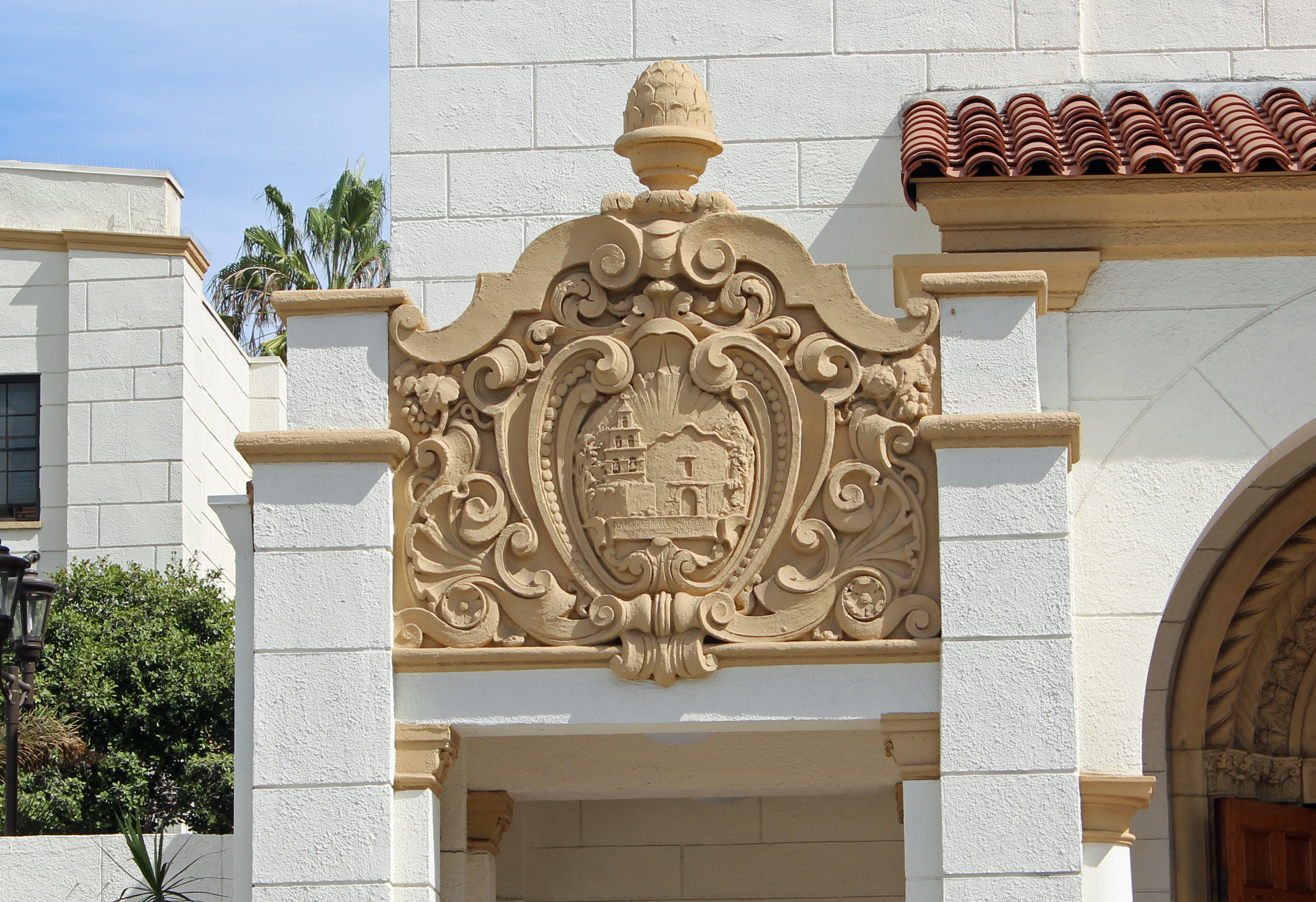
Diocesan coat of arms, St. Joseph's Cathedral (2012)

== Pastors ==
1. Antonio Ubach, 1874 – 1907
2. Bernard Smyth, 1907 – 1912
3. Joseph Nunan, 1912 – 1914
4. Eugene A. Heffernan, 1914 – 1919
5. John J. Brady, 1919 – 1929
6. John M. Hegarty, 1929 – 1940
7. Franklin Hurd, 1940 – 1947
8. Francis Dillon, 1947 – 1954
9. William A. Bergin, 1954 – 1955
10. George M. Rice, 1955 – 1969
11. Anthony Giesing, 1969 – 1976
12. Rudolph Galindo, 1976 – 1983
13. Gilbert E. Chavez, 1983 – 2007
14. Peter Escalante, 2007 – 2015
15. Patrick Mulcahy, 2015 – 2019
16. Peter Navarra, 2019 – present

== See also ==
- List of Catholic cathedrals in the United States
- List of cathedrals in the United States
