= Robert Brom =

Catholic bishop (1938–2022)

His Excellency, The Most Reverend Robert Brom
- Bishop of San Diego
- Diocese: San Diego
- Appointed: April 22, 1989 (Coadjutor)
- Installed: July 10, 1990
- Term ended: September 18, 2013
- Predecessor: Leo Thomas Maher
- Successor: Cirilo Flores
- Previous post: Bishop of Duluth (1983 to 1989)

Orders
- Ordination: December 18, 1963 by Filippo Poccia
- Consecration: May 23, 1983 by John Robert Roach, Loras Joseph Watters, and Paul Francis Anderson

Personal details
- Born: September 18, 1938 Arcadia, Wisconsin, U.S.
- Died: May 9, 2022 (aged 83) San Diego, California, U.S.
- Denomination: Catholic
- Motto: Ego sum Christi (English: "I belong to Christ")

Ordination history of Robert Brom
History
Episcopal consecration
- Consecrated by: John Robert Roach (Saint Paul and Minneapolis)
Episcopal succession
Bishops consecrated by Robert Brom as principal consecrator
- Salvatore J. Cordileone: August 21, 2002

Styles of Robert Henry Brom
- Reference style: His Excellency; The Most Reverend
- Spoken style: Your Excellency
- Religious style: Bishop

Robert Henry Brom (September 18, 1938 – May 9, 2022) was an American prelate of the Catholic Church. He served as bishop of the Diocese of Duluth in Minnesota, from 1983 to 1989, and as bishop of the Diocese of San Diego in Southern California from 1990 to 2013.

== Biography ==
=== Early life and priesthood ===
Brom was born in Arcadia, Wisconsin, on September 18, 1938. Brom was ordained a priest in Rome by Bishop Filippo Poccia for Diocese of Winona at the minor basilica of Sacro Cuore di Cristo Re on December 18, 1963.

=== Bishop of Duluth ===
On March 25, 1983, Pope John Paul II appointed Brom as bishop of Duluth. He was consecrated on May 23, 1983, by Archbishop John Roach at the Cathedral of Our Lady of the Rosary in Duluth, Minnesota.

On April 22, 1989, John Paul II appointed Brom as coadjutor bishop of San Diego to assist Bishop Leo Maher.

=== Bishop of San Diego ===
On July 10, 1990, after John Paul II accepted Maher's resignation, Brom automatically became the new bishop of San Diego.

On September 7, 2007, the diocese agreed to a $200 million settlement to victims of childhood sexual abuse by priests serving in the diocese since its founding in 1935. Brom apologized to the victims and said that the offenders' histories would be made public. Brom was responsible for the creation of two Catholic high schools:

- Mater Dei Catholic High School in Chula Vista, California, replacing Marian Catholic High School in Imperial Beach, California
- Cathedral Catholic High School in Carmel Valley, California, replacing University of San Diego High School in Linda Vista, California

Brom also created a pastoral center in San Diego after selling the former chancery building to the University of San Diego.

On January 4, 2012, the apostolic nuncio to the United States, Archbishop Carlo Vigano, announced that Pope Benedict XVI had appointed Auxiliary Bishop Cirilo Flores as coadjutor bishop to assist Brom in the diocese.

=== Retirement and legacy ===
Pope Francis accepted Brom's resignation on the latter's 75th birthday, September 18, 2013. He was succeeded automatically by Flores. Robert Brom died in San Diego on May 9, 2022, at age 83.

== See also ==
- Catholic Church hierarchy
- Catholic Church in the United States
- Historical list of the Catholic bishops of the United States
- List of Catholic bishops of the United States
- Lists of patriarchs, archbishops, and bishops

Catholic Church titles
Preceded by Leo Thomas Maher	Bishop of San Diego; 1990–2013	Succeeded by Cirilo Flores
Preceded by Paul Francis Anderson	Bishop of Duluth; 1983–1989	Succeeded by Roger Lawrence Schwietz
