= Harry Anselm Clinch =

American prelate

His Excellency, The Most Reverend Harry Anselm Clinch
- Bishop of Monterey in California; Titular Bishop of Badiae
- Church: Roman Catholic Church
- See: Diocese of Monterey in California
- Predecessor: Aloysius Joseph Willinger
- Successor: Thaddeus Anthony Shubsda
- Other posts: Auxiliary Bishop of Monterey-Fresno; 1956 to 1967; Titular Bishop of Badiae

Orders
- Ordination: June 6, 1936 by Philip Scher
- Consecration: February 27, 1957 by Aloysius Willinger

Personal details
- Born: October 27, 1908 San Anselmo, California, US
- Died: March 8, 2003 (aged 94) Santa Cruz, California, US
- Education: St. Benedict's Seminary; St. Patrick's College; St. Patrick's Seminary
- Motto: Salus animarum suprema lex (The salvation of souls is the supreme law)

Harry Anselm Clinch (October 27, 1908 – March 8, 2003) was an American prelate of the Roman Catholic Church. He served as bishop of the Diocese of Monterey in California from 1967 to 1982. He previously served as an auxiliary bishop of the Diocese of Monterey-Fresno from 1956 to 1967.

== Biography ==
=== Early life and education ===
Harry Clinch was born on October 27, 1908, in San Anselmo, California, to Henry Joseph and Mary E. (née McLoughlin) Clinch. In 1915, the Clinch family moved to Fresno, California, where he attended John Muir Elementary School and Fresno High School (1924–1925).

In 1925, Clinch was accepted by Bishop John MacGinley as a seminarian for the Diocese of Monterey-Fresno. He entered St. Benedict's Seminary in Atchison, Kansas, with a grant from the Students Endowment Fund established by the Catholic Church Extension Society. He attended St. Joseph's College in Mountain View from 1928 to 1930, and St. Patrick's Seminary in Menlo Park from 1930 to 1936.

=== Priesthood ===
Clinch was ordained to the priesthood in Fresno for the Diocese of Monterey-Fresno by Bishop Philip Scher on June 6, 1936. He was diocesan director of the Society for the Propagation of the Faith from 1936 to 1948. In 1937, he founded and became director of Santa Teresita Camp, the diocesan summer camp for children in Three Rivers, California. He also served as diocesan director of the Catholic Youth Organization (1939–1940), a chaplain at St. Agnes Hospital in Fresno (1942–1946), and dean of Kern and Inyo Counties.

From 1941 to 1948, Clinch was editor of the diocesan newspaper, Central California Register. He received his first assignment as a pastor in 1946 at Our Lady of Perpetual Help Parish in Clovis, California, where he remained for two years. In 1948, Clinch became the founding pastor of Sacred Heart Parish in Fresno, California. At Sacred Heart, he constructed a church and established a parochial school.

Clinch was appointed pastor of St. Mary's Parish in Taft, California, in 1948. He was elevated by Pope Pius XII to the rank of domestic prelate in 1952. In 1958, Clinch was assigned to the Carmel Mission Basilica in Carmel-by-the-Sea, California.

=== Auxiliary Bishop of Monterey-Fresno ===
On December 5, 1956, Clinch was appointed as an auxiliary bishop of the Diocese of Monterey-Fresno and titular bishop of Badiae by Pius XII. He received his episcopal consecration at St. Theresa Church in Fresno on February 27, 1957, from Bishop Aloysius Willinger, with Bishops Timothy Manning and Merlin Guilfoyle serving as co-consecrators. He was the thirteenth native Californian to become a Catholic bishop. As an auxiliary bishop, he continued to serve at the Carmel Mission Basilica. Clinch attended all four sessions of the Second Vatican Council in Rome between 1962 and 1965.

=== Bishop of Monterey ===
Following the split of the Diocese of Monterey from the Diocese of Fresno, Clinch was named Bishop of Monterey by Pope Paul VI on October 16, 1967.During his 14-year tenure, Clinch implemented the reforms of the Second Vatican Council, ordained 22 priests, and established five new parishes. In May 1969, he succeeded Cardinal John Wright as episcopal adviser to the National Catholic Laymen's Retreat Conference.

=== Resignation and legacy ===
On January 19, 1982, Pope John Paul II accepted Clinch's resignation as bishop of Monterey. He sold his house in Pebble Beach, California, and used the proceeds to establish the Bishop Harry A. Clinch Endowment Fund. Harry Clinch moved to a retirement community in Santa Cruz, California, where he died on March 8, 2003, at age 94. At the time of his death, he was believed to be the last surviving American participant of the Second Vatican Council.

== See also ==
Catholic Church titles
Preceded by Aloysius Joseph Willinger	Bishop of Monterey in California; 1967—1982	Succeeded by Thaddeus Anthony Shubsda
