= Diocese of Monterey in California =

Latin Catholic ecclesiastical jurisdiction in California, US

Coordinates: 36.6000°N 121.9000°W

Diocese of Monterey in California Dioecesis Montereyensis in California
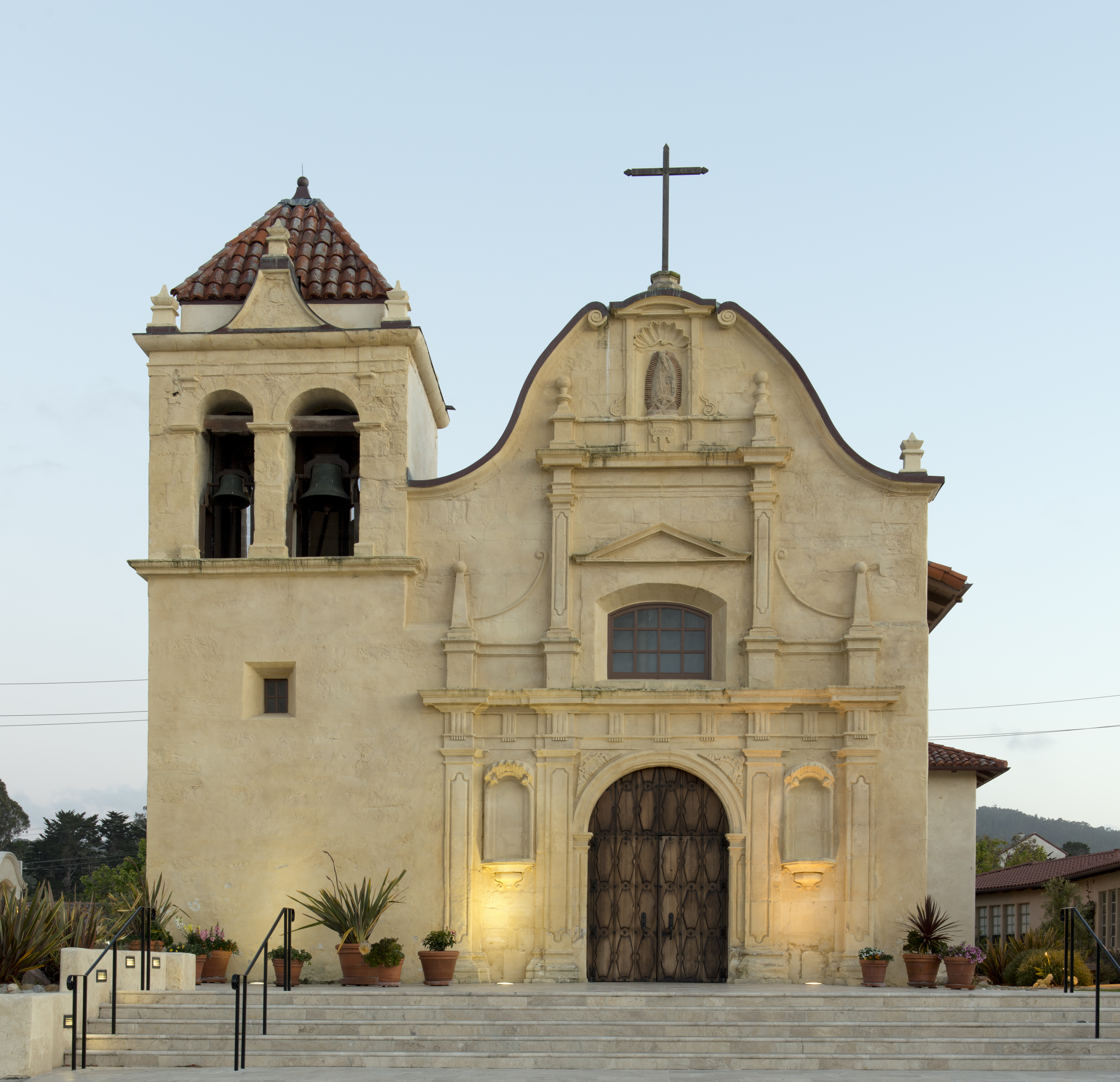
- Cathedral of San Carlos Borromeo

- Coat of arms

Location
- Country: United States
- Territory: Counties of Monterey, San Benito, San Luis Obispo, and Santa Cruz, California, Region XI, United States
- Ecclesiastical province: Archdiocese of Los Angeles

Statistics
- Population: Total; Catholics: 1,040,498; 208,100 (20.0%)

Information
- Denomination: Catholic
- Sui iuris church: Latin Church
- Rite: Roman Rite
- Established: April 27, 1840, reestablished October 6, 1967
- Cathedral: Cathedral of San Carlos Borromeo
- Patron saint: Our Lady of Bethlehem; Saint Charles Borromeo

Current leadership
- Pope: Leo XIV
- Bishop: Ramon Bejarano
- Metropolitan Archbishop: José Gómez
- Bishops emeritus: Sylvester Donovan Ryan

Map
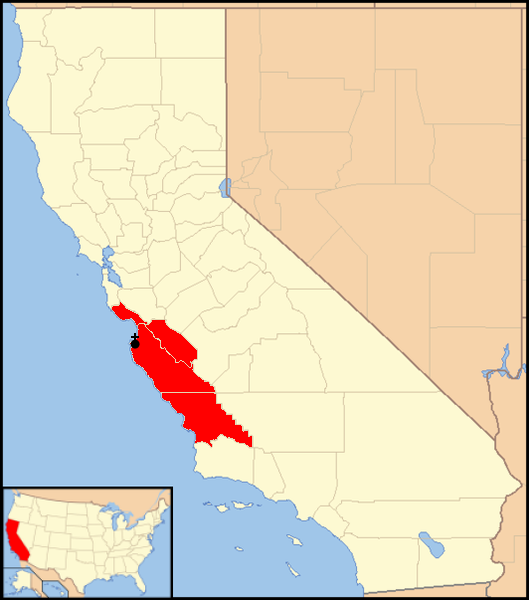

Website
- dioceseofmonterey.org

The Diocese of Monterey in California (Latin: Dioecesis Montereyensis in California) is a diocese of the Catholic Church in the Central Coast region of California. It comprises Monterey, San Benito, San Luis Obispo and Santa Cruz counties. The mother church is the Cathedral of San Carlos Borromeo in Monterey. The diocese is home to seven of California's 21 Franciscan missions, more than any other California diocese.

== Name changes ==
Since 1849, four dioceses in California have included the Monterey name:

- Diocese of Monterey (1849 to 1859) – covered all of central and southern California
- Diocese of Monterey-Los Angeles (1859 to 1922) - covered all of central and southern California
- Diocese of Monterey-Fresno (1922 to 1967) – covered the Central Coast and the Central Valley of California
- Diocese of Monterey in California (1967 to present) – covers the Central Coast of California

== History ==
=== 1700 to 1800 ===
The history of the Catholic Church in Monterey began with the establishment of Mission San Carlos Borromeo on Monterey Bay in 1770 by Junípero Serra. Serra moved the mission to present-day Carmel the next year. It would serve as the headquarters of the Spanish missions along the Alta California coast.

- Serra established the Mission San Luis Obispo de Tolosa Mission in San Luis Obispo in 1772.
- Fermín Francisco de Lasuén founded the Mission Santa Cruz in Santa Cruz and the Mission Nuestra Señora de la Soledad in Soledad in 1791.

=== 1800 to 1850 ===
After the end of the Mexican War of Independence in 1821, the new Mexican government secularized all of the remaining Catholic missions in Alta California in 1835.

In 1840, Pope Gregory XVI set up the Roman Catholic Diocese of California. The new diocese included the following Mexican territories:

- Alta California (Upper California), including the modern American states of California, Nevada, Arizona, and Utah, along with western Colorado and southwestern Wyoming
- Baja California Territory (Lower California), including the modern Mexican states of Baja California and Baja California Sur

Gregory XVI set the episcopal see at present-day San Diego in Alta California and made the Diocese of California a suffragan of the Archdiocese of Mexico City. The first bishop of the new diocese was Francisco Garcia Diego y Moreno. Diego designated the Mission Santa Barbara in Santa Barbara as his pro-cathedral.

After ceding Alta California to the United States at the close of the Mexican–American War in 1848, the government of Mexico objected to San Diego, a see city now located in the United States, having jurisdiction over Mexican parishes. In response, the Vatican divided the Diocese of California into American and Mexican sections in 1849. The American section became the Diocese of Monterey; the see city was moved to Monterey because of its more central location. The Royal Presidio Chapel in Monterey became the cathedral of the new American diocese.

=== 1850 to 1900 ===
Pope Pius IX split the Diocese of Monterey in 1853, erecting the Metropolitan Archdiocese of San Francisco. He designated the Diocese of Monterey as a suffragan diocese of the new archdiocese. The first parish in Watsonville was Our Lady Help of Christians Church, founded in 1854.

In 1859, Pius IX changed the name of the diocese to the Diocese of Monterey-Los Angeles due to the growth of the City of Los Angeles. The first parish in Salinas was Sacred Heart, founded as a mission in 1874.

=== 1900 to 1950 ===
In 1922, Pope Pius XI suppressed the Diocese of Monterey-Los Angeles, erecting in its place the Diocese of Los Angeles-San Diego. and the Diocese of Monterey-Fresno.

In 1936, Pope Pius XI elevated the Diocese of Los Angeles-San Diego to the Archdiocese of Los Angeles and designated the Diocese of Monterey-Fresno as one of its suffragan sees. Our Lady of Perpetual Help Hospital opened in Santa Maria in 1940, constructed by the Sisters of Saint Francis of Penance and Christian Charity. Today it is Marian Regional Medical Center. In 1941, the Adrian Dominican Sisters established Sisters Hospital in Santa Cruz. It is today Dominican Hospital.

=== 1950 to 2000 ===
In 1967, Pope Paul VI divided the Diocese of Monterey-Fresno into the Diocese of Fresno and the Diocese of Monterey in California. The pope named Auxiliary Bishop Harry Anselm Clinch of Monterey-Fresno in 1967 as the first bishop of Monterey in California. During his 14-year tenure, Clinch implemented the reforms of the Second Vatican Council of the early 1960s, ordained 22 priests, and established five new parishes. Clinch resigned in 1982.

The second bishop of Monterey was Auxiliary Bishop Thaddeus Anthony Shubsda of Los Angeles, appointed by Pope John Paul II in 1982. Shubsda was widely regarded as an expert on labor issues and social justice. He was an outspoken advocate of farm and factory workers in the diocese.

Shubsda acted as a mediator between management and labor in the Watsonville frozen food strikes. Shubsda spoke out for better living conditions for field workers, some of whom were living in caves in Salinas. His actions prompted labor leader César Chávez to remark, "The church has many flaws, but in many ways it is still the best friend we have." Shubsda hosted John Paul II's visit to the Monterey Peninsula in 1987, and actively promoted the beatification of Junípero Serra.

After Shubsda died in 1991, Auxiliary Bishop Sylvester Ryan of Los Angeles was appointed the next bishop of Monterey by Pope John Paul II.

=== 2000 to present ===
Ryan retired as bishop of Monterey in 2006. Pope Benedict XVI named Auxiliary Bishop Richard Garcia of the Diocese of Sacramento in 2006 to replace Ryan. In June 2009, the diocese paid a $1.2 million settlement to a man from Yuma, Arizona, who had been sexually assaulted in Salinas when he was a child by two priests: Juan Guillen and John Velez. Guillen was sentenced to ten years in prison in Arizona in 2003. Velez, visiting from Mexico, was expelled from the diocese by officials in 1991, and representatives of his order escorted him back to Mexico, according to the diocese. In March 2012, pastor Antonio Cortes was convicted of sodomy involving a minor and possession of child pornography and sentenced to one year in prison. After his release, Cortes fled to Mexico. The victim sued the diocese in 2018, and the lawsuit was settled the same year.

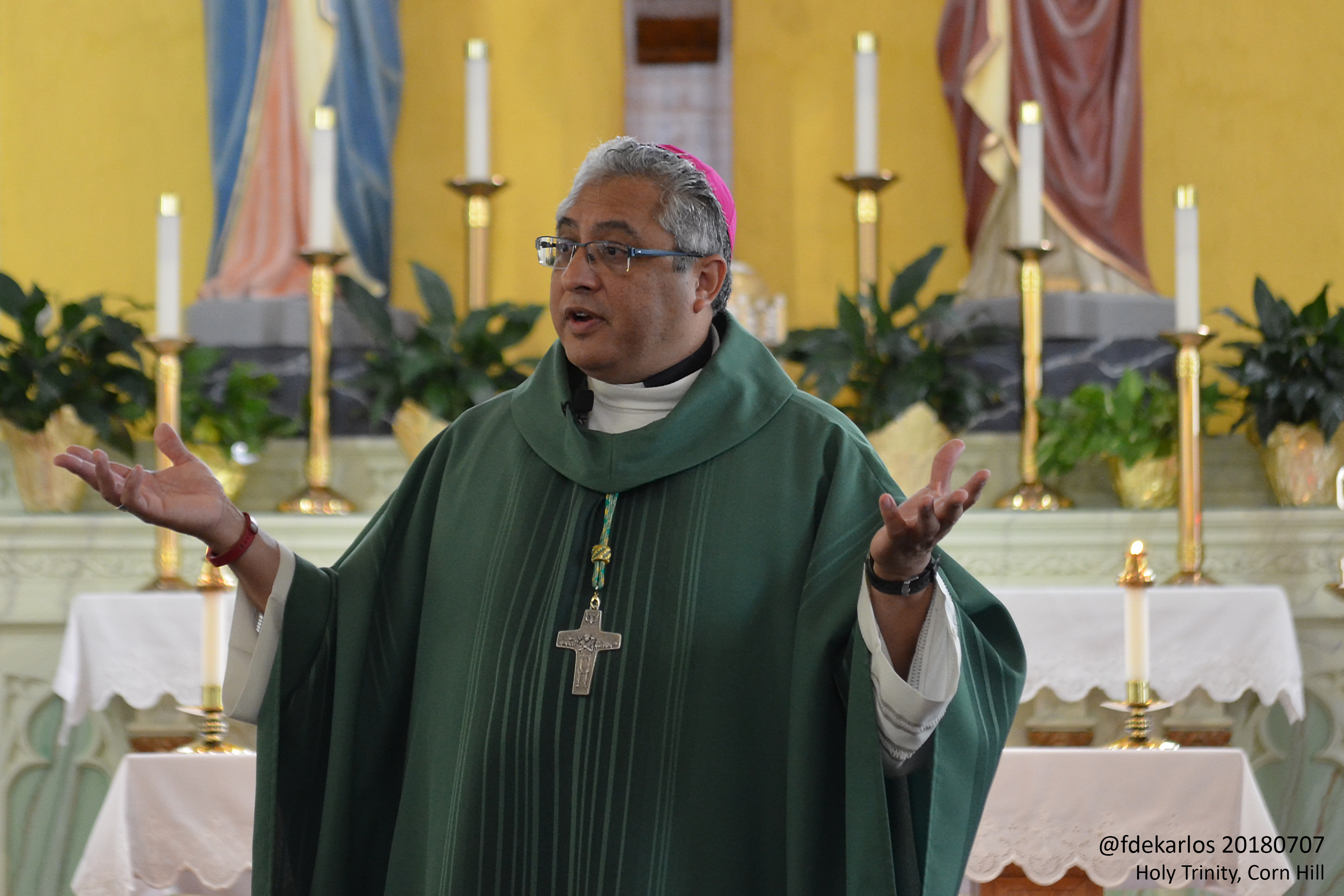
Bishop Daniel Garcia (2018)

In 2018, Richard Garcia resigned as bishop of Monterey, and Pope Francis appointed Auxiliary Bishop Daniel E. Garcia of the Diocese of Austin as the next bishop. In 2019, the Diocese of Monterey published a list of 30 clerics with credible accusations of sexual misconduct. In July 2025, Pope Leo XIV appointed Bishop Daniel Garcia as bishop of the Diocese of Austin. Before leaving office, Garcia banned the celebration of the Traditional Latin Mass in the diocese in September 2025, saying that he wanted to promote unity.

In December 2025, Leo XIV selected Auxiliary Bishop Ramon Bejarano of the Diocese of San Diego as bishop of Monterey.

== Bishops ==
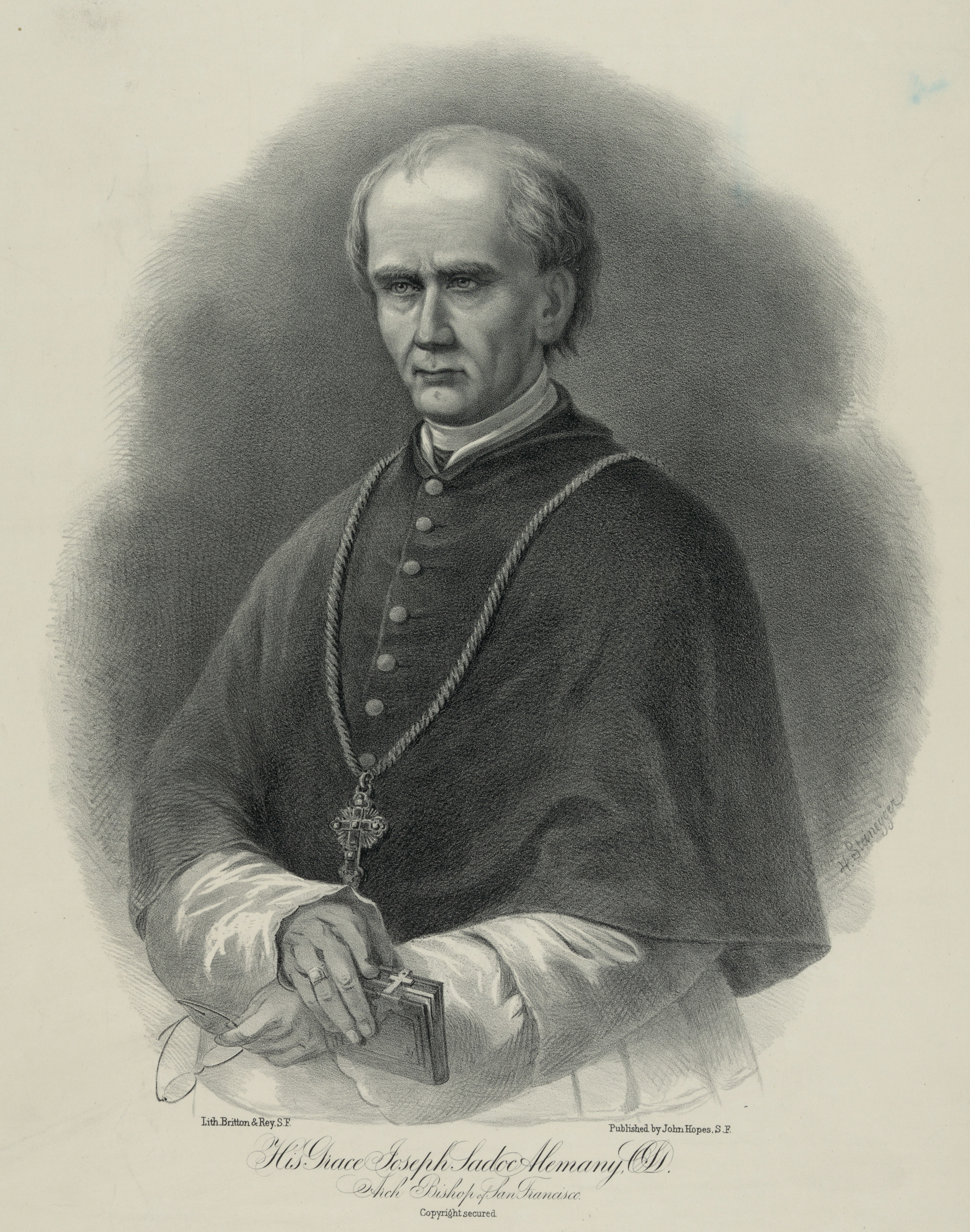
Bishop Alemany (1879)

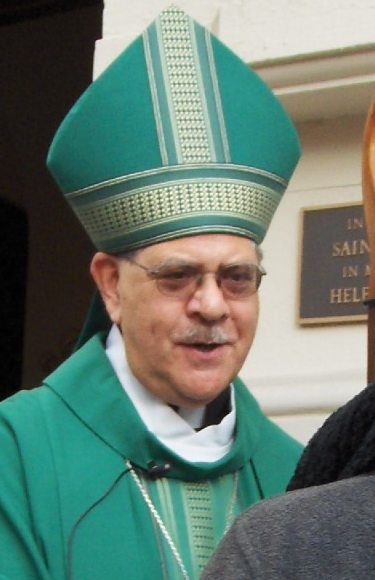
Bishop Richard Garcia (2007)

=== Bishop of Monterey ===
Joseph Alemany (1850–1853), appointed Archbishop of San Francisco

=== Bishops of Monterey-Los Angeles ===
1. Thaddeus Amat y Brusi (1853–1878)
2. Francisco Mora y Borrell (1878–1896; coadjutor bishop 1873–1878)
3. George Thomas Montgomery (1896–1902; coadjutor bishop 1894–1896), appointed Coadjutor Archbishop of San Francisco but died before succession to that see
4. Thomas James Conaty (1903–1915)
5. John Joseph Cantwell (1917–1922), title changed with title of diocese

=== Bishops of Monterey-Fresno ===
1. John Bernard MacGinley (1924-1932)
2. Philip George Scher (1933-1953)
3. Aloysius Joseph Willinger (1953-1967)

=== Bishops of Monterey in California ===
1. Harry Anselm Clinch (1967–1982)
2. Thaddeus Anthony Shubsda (1982–1991)
3. Sylvester Donovan Ryan (1992–2006)
4. Richard John Garcia (2007–2018)
  - Gerald Eugene Wilkerson, Auxiliary Bishop of Los Angeles (apostolic administrator 2018–2019)
5. Daniel E. Garcia (2019–2025)
  - Slawomir Szkredka, Auxiliary Bishop of Los Angeles (apostolic administrator September 19, 2025–December 17, 2025)
6. Ramon Bejarano (2026-present)

=== Other diocesan priest who became bishop ===
Tod David Brown, appointed Bishop of Boise City in 1988

== Missions ==
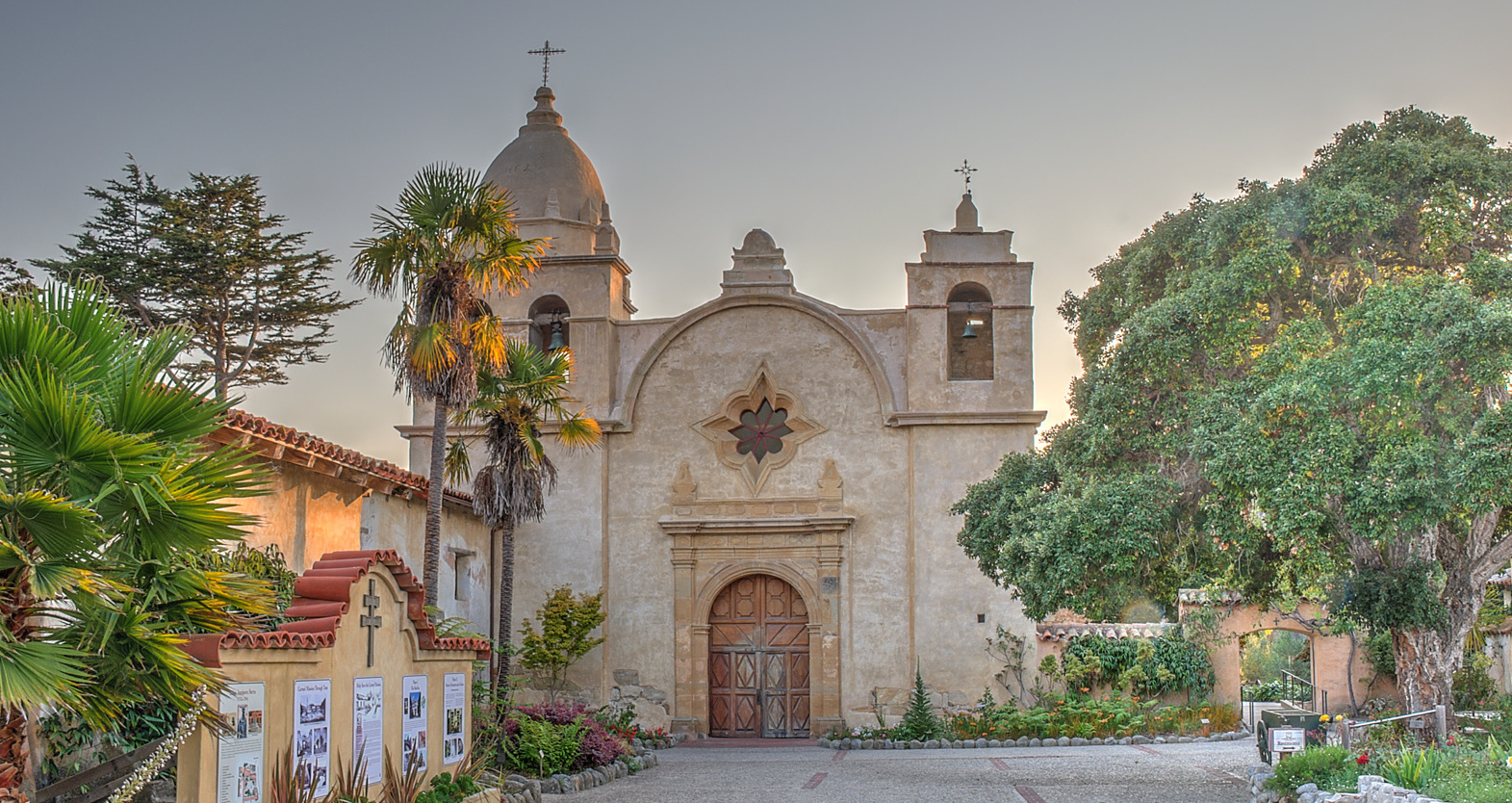
Mission San Carlos Borromeo de Carmelo

The Diocese of Monterey in California is home to the Cathedral of San Carlos in Monterey. Constructed in 1795, it is oldest stone building and the oldest cathedral in California. The other former Spanish missions in the diocese include:

- Mission San Carlos Borromeo de Carmelo – (1797) Carmel Valley
- Mission Nuestra Señora de la Soledad – (1791) Soledad
- Mission San Antonio de Padua – (1771) Jolon
- Mission San Juan Bautista – (1797) San Juan Bautista
- Mission San Luis Obispo de Tolosa – (1772) San Luis Obispo
- Mission San Miguel Arcangel – (1797) San Miguel
- Mission Santa Cruz – (1791) Santa Cruz

== Education ==
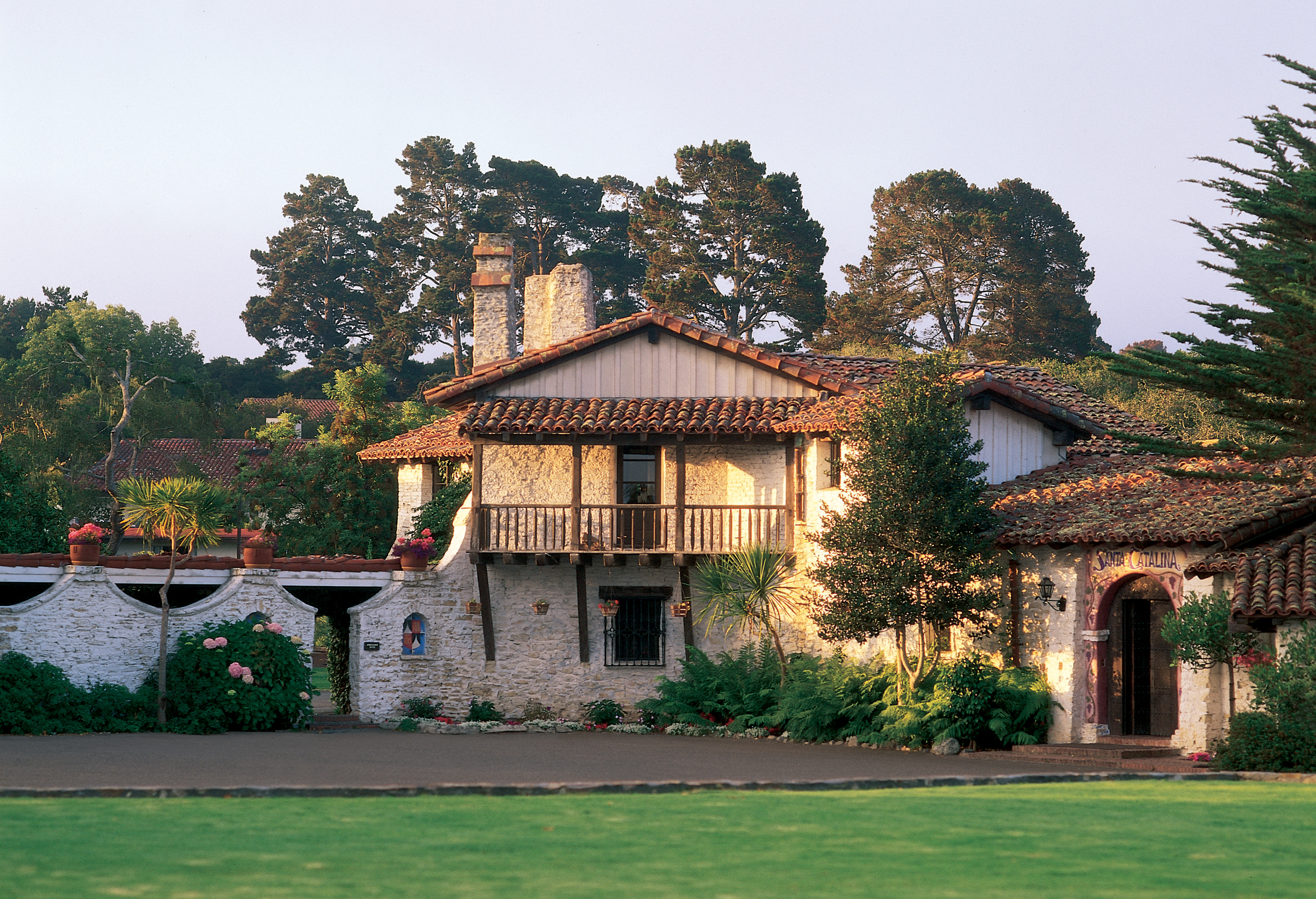
Santa Catalina School

As of 2026, the Diocese of Monterey in California has four high schools and 13 pre-school/elementary schools.

=== High schools ===
- Mission College Prep – San Luis Obispo
- Palma School – Salinas
- Santa Catalina School – Monterey
- Saint Francis High School – Watsonville
