= Sisters of the Holy Family =

The Sisters of the Holy Family is the name for several different religious institutes of women in the Catholic Church:

- The Sisters of the Holy Family (France), founded in Paris in 1806 by Jeanne-Claude Jacoulet in a revival of the Canonesses of St. Genevieve
- The Sisters of the Holy Family of Villefranche, founded by Émilie de Rodat in 1816 in Villefranche-de-Rouergue, France
- The Congregation of the Holy Family of Bordeaux, religious Sisters who are a part of the Association of the Holy Family of Bordeaux founded in 1820 by Pierre-Bienvenu Noailles, a canon of that city
- The Sisters of the Holy Family (Louisiana), founded in 1837 by Henriette DeLille for African-American women
- The Sisters of the Holy Family of Helmet, founded in 1856 by three sisters, Rosalie, Henriette and Mélanie Van Biervliet, in Tielt, Belgium
- The Sisters of the Holy Family (California), founded in 1872 by Father John J. Prendergast and Lizzie Armer in San Francisco, California, United States
- The Sisters of the Holy Family of Nazareth, founded in 1875 in Rome, Italy, by Mother Mary of Jesus the Good Shepherd, a Polish noblewoman born Frances Siedliska
