= Sylvester Ryan =

Sylvester Ryan may refer to:

- Sylvester Donovan Ryan (b. 1930), retired Roman Catholic bishop
- Sylvester J. Ryan (1896–1981), U.S. federal judge
- Sylvester Perry Ryan (1918-2001), Canadian lawyer and politician
