= James Edward McManus =

Bishop of Ponce, Puerto Rico and Auxiliary Bishop of the Archdiocese of New York

His Excellency, The Most Reverend James Edward McManus CSsR
- Auxiliary Bishop of New York; Titular Bishop of Benda
- Church: Catholic Church
- Archdiocese: New York
- Appointed: November 18, 1963
- Other post: Bishop of Ponce

Orders
- Ordination: June 19, 1927 by Patrick Joseph Hayes
- Consecration: July 1, 1947 by William Tibertus McCarty

Personal details
- Born: October 10, 1900 Brooklyn, New York, US
- Died: July 3, 1976 Long Branch, New Jersey, US

James Edward McManus CSsR (October 10, 1900 – July 6, 1976) was an American prelate of the Roman Catholic Church. A member of the Redemptorist Order, he served as bishop of the Diocese of Ponce in Puerto Rico from 1947 to 1963 and as an auxiliary bishop of the Archdiocese of New York from 1963 to 1970.

== Early life and education ==
James McManus was born on October 10, 1900, in Brooklyn, New York, the eighth of nine children of William and Elizabeth (née O'Loughlin) McManus. He received his early education at the parochial school of Our Lady of Perpetual Help Parish in Brooklyn from 1906 to 1914.

In 1915, McManus enrolled at St. Mary's College, a preparatory school operated by the Redemptorists in North East, Pennsylvania. He then studied at Mount St. Alphonsus Seminary in Esopus, New York, from 1922 to 1928. He made his profession as a Redemptorist in Ilchester, Maryland, on August 2, 1922.

== Priesthood ==
On June 19, 1927, McManus was ordained to the priesthood by Cardinal Patrick Joseph Hayes for the Redemptorist Order at Mount St. Alphonsus. After his ordination, the Redemptorists in 1929 assigned him to their mission in Caguas, Puerto Rico. They later sent him to Washington D.C. to attend the Catholic University of America, where he earned a Doctor of Canon Law degree in 1937. He then served as professor of canon law at Mount St. Alphonsus Seminary until 1940, when the Redemptorists returned him to Puerto Rico. He was assigned as pastor to a parish in Aguadilla. Five years later, the Redemptorists transferred McManus to a parish in Mayagüez.

== Episcopacy ==
=== Bishop of Ponce ===
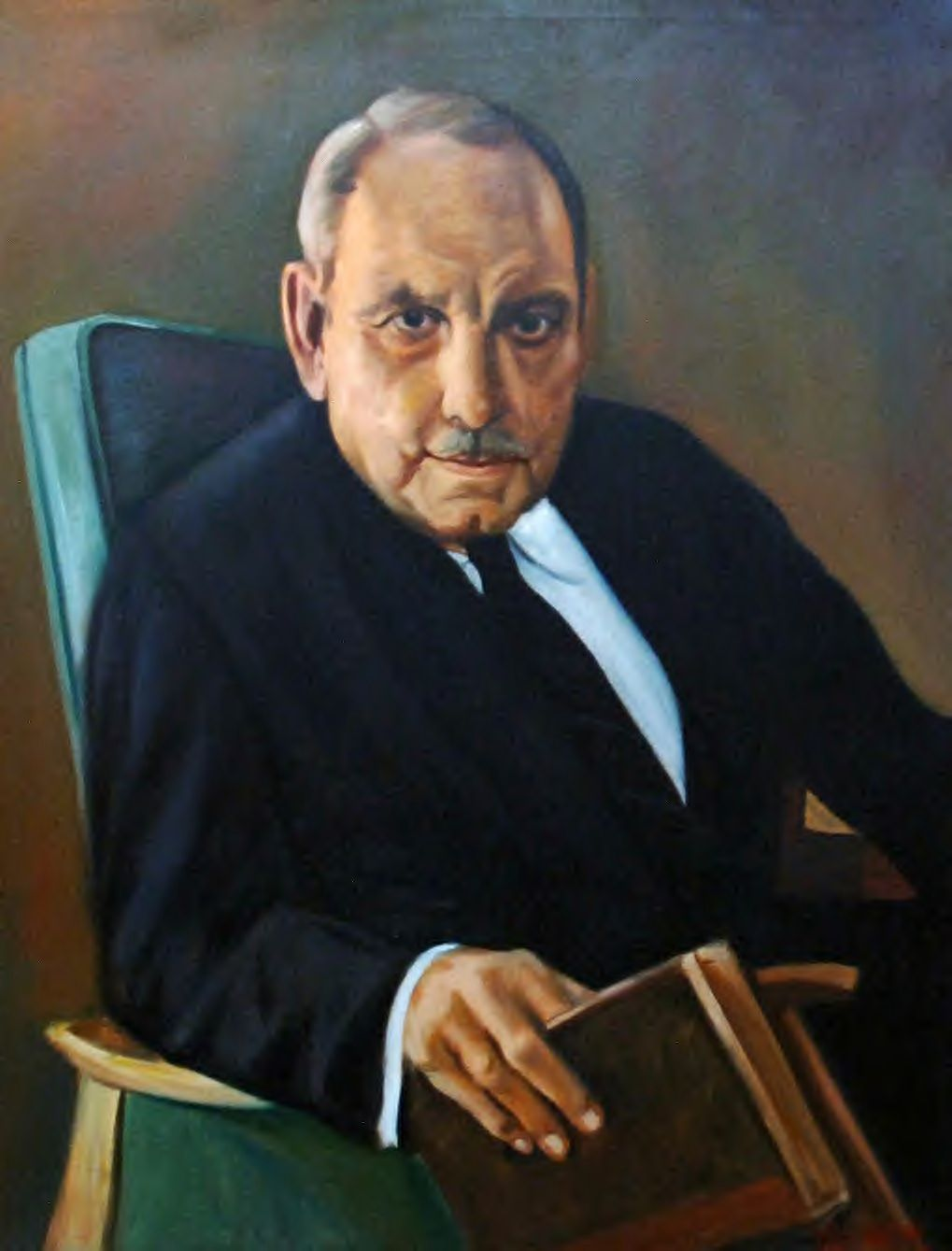
Governor Luis Muñoz Marín

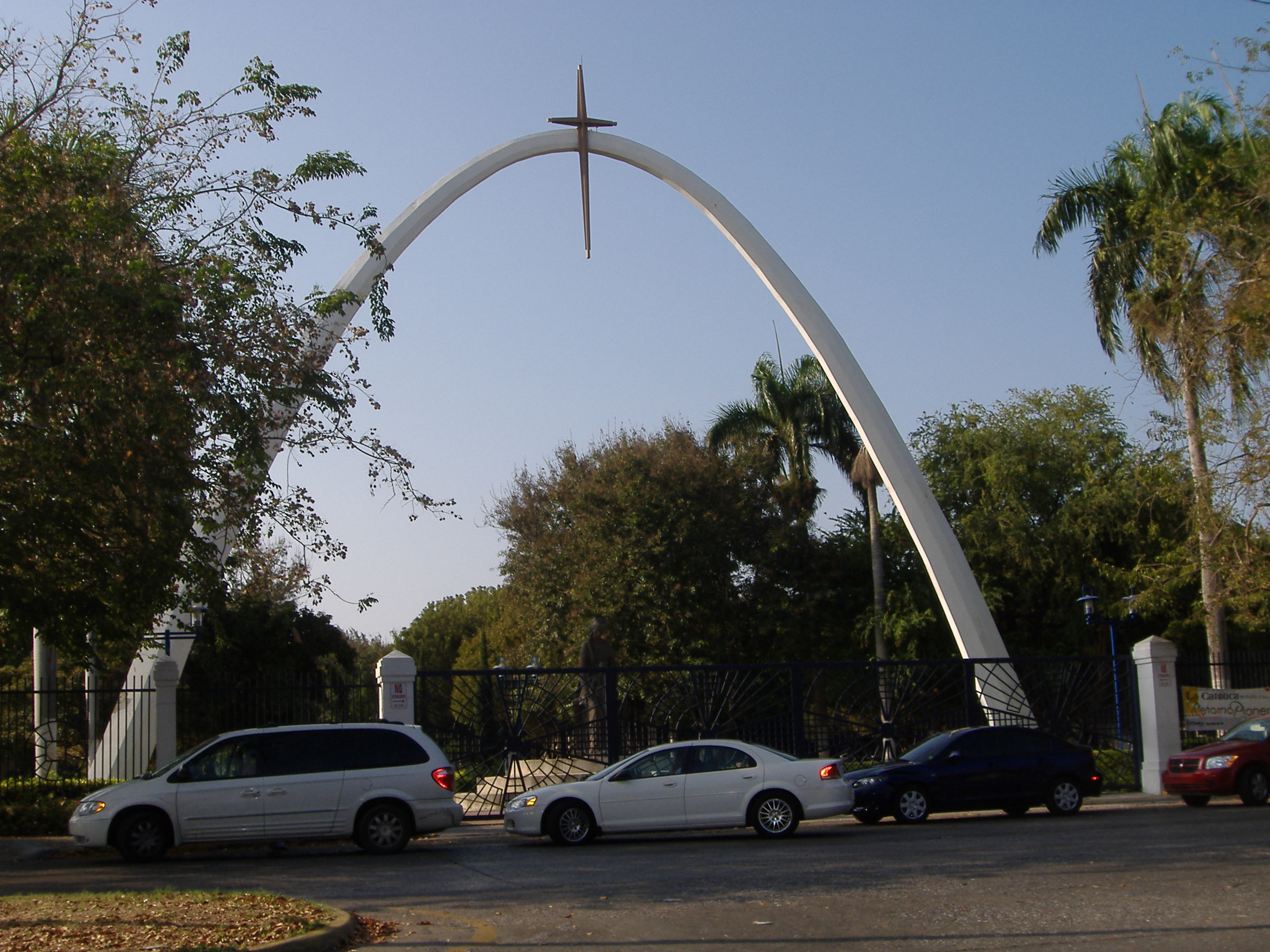
Pontifical Catholic University of Puerto Rico, Ponce, Puerto Rico (2007)

On May 10, 1947, McManus was appointed bishop of Ponce by Pope Pius XII. He received his episcopal consecration on July 1, 1947 from Bishop William McCarty, with Bishops Aloysius Willinger and William O'Brien serving as co-consecrators, at Our Lady of Perpetual Help Church in Brooklyn.

McManus in 1948 founded the Pontifical Catholic University of Puerto Rico in Ponce. He also oversaw the relocation that same year of the San Ildefonso Seminary from San Juan to Aibonito in the Diocese of Ponce.

During his tenure in Ponce, McManus became an outspoken critic of Governor Luis Muñoz Marín. In the 1952 and 1956 elections in Puerto Rico, he opposed Muñoz Marín and supported the Republican Statehood Party, which demanded statehood for the island and proposed an economic plan similar to that of the US Republican Party. In 1958, he feuded with Muñoz Marín over his program to crack down on gambling, including bingo games for the support of parish churches. He denounced the legalization of artificial birth control and a law that would divorce couples who had separated for over three years. He also opposed Muñoz Marín's measure to cut the tax-exempt charitable donations by corporations from 15 percent of gross income to five percent of surplus.

In 1960, after the Legislative Assembly failed to pass a law allowing religious instruction for school children, McManus said that the administration of Muñoz Marín was "responsible for the moral evils that cloud and de-Christianize our society." In August 1960, he helped organize the Christian Action Party (PAC), which he urged all Catholics to support. The PAC nominated Salvador Perea, a professor at the Pontifical Catholic University, as its candidate for governor, but was caught in a controversy over the validity of the signatures it collected to get on the ballot.

A month before the election, McManus and two other bishops in Puerto Rico issued a pastoral letter prohibiting Catholics from voting for Muñoz Marín's Popular Democratic Party (PPD). The letter said that the PPD "accepts as its own the morality of a 'regime of license,' denying Christian morality...." The letter also stated,

"It is evident that the philosophy of the Popular Democratic Party is anti-Christian and anti-Catholic, and that it is based on the modern heresy that popular will and not divine law decides what is moral and immoral. This philosophy destroys the Ten Commandments of God and permits that they be substituted by popular and human criteria."

McManus stated that Catholics voting for the PPD would commit a sin. The letter resulted in widespread protests in Puerto Rico and sparked open controversy within the Catholic Church. Cardinal Francis Spellman of New York declared that the Catholic Church would not penalize Puerto Ricans for their votes. Muñoz Marín denounced the pastoral letter as an "incredible medieval interference in a political campaign."

=== Auxiliary Bishop of New York ===
McManus resigned as bishop of Ponce for reasons of health on November 18, 1963. On the same date, he was appointed as an auxiliary bishop of New York and titular bishop of Benda by Pope Paul VI. McManus denied that the Vatican transferred him to New York due to his political activities in Puerto Rico, calling his appointment "routine." As an auxiliary bishop, he served as pastor of St. Cecilia's Church in Manhattan from 1964 to 1966 and as episcopal vicar of Sullivan and Ulster Counties, a post that he held until his retirement in 1970. Between 1962 and 1965, McManus attended all four sessions of the Second Vatican Council in Rome.

McManus died at the Monmouth Medical Center in Long Branch, New Jersey, on July 3, 1976, at age 75.

Catholic Church titles
Preceded by Aloysius Joseph Willinger	Bishop of Ponce; 1947–1963	Succeeded by Luis Aponte Martínez
