= Philip George Scher =

American clergyman

- Bishop of Monterey-Fresno
- Church: Catholic Church
- Diocese: Diocese of Monterey-Fresno
- In office: April 28, 1933 – January 3, 1953
- Predecessor: John Bernard MacGinley
- Successor: Aloysius Joseph Willinger

Orders
- Ordination: June 6, 1903 by Pietro Respighi
- Consecration: June 29, 1933 by Edward Joseph Hanna

Personal details
- Born: February 22, 1880 Belleville, Illinois, United States
- Died: January 3, 1953 (aged 72) Fresno, California, United States

Philip George Scher (February 22, 1880 – January 3, 1953) was an American clergyman of the Roman Catholic Church. He served as Bishop of Monterey-Fresno from 1933 until his death in 1953.

== Biography ==
Philip Scher was born in Belleville, Illinois, to Philip Joseph and Catherine (née Wagner) Scher, who were German immigrants. He received his early education at the parochial school of St. Peter's Church in his native city. He then attended the Pontifical College Josephinum in Columbus, Ohio, from 1893 to 1896. He continued his studies at the Propaganda College in Rome, where he was ordained to the priesthood by Cardinal Pietro Respighi on June 6, 1903. Upon his return to the United States in 1903, he served as a teacher at the Josephinum for a year.

Scher then went to California due to ill health and was incardinated into the Diocese of Monterey-Los Angeles in October 1904. He served as a curate at St. Vibiana's Cathedral in Los Angeles (1904–05) and at Our Lady of Sorrows Church in Santa Barbara (1905–08) before receiving his first pastorate at Our Lady of Mount Carmel Church in Montecito in 1908. He then served at St. Brigid Church in Hanford (1911–18) and St. Francis Church in Bakersfield (1918–24), and was transferred to St. Joseph Church in Capitola after requesting a small parish due to a return to ill health. In 1930, he became a pastor in Monterey and vicar general of the diocese.

On April 28, 1933, Scher was appointed Bishop of Monterey-Fresno by Pope Pius XI. He received his episcopal consecration on the following June 29 from Archbishop Edward Joseph Hanna, with Bishops John Joseph Cantwell and Thomas Kiely Gorman serving as co-consecrators. After suffering a stroke in 1946, he was confined to a hospital in Fresno, and received Aloysius Joseph Willinger as his coadjutor bishop. He later died at age 72.
