= Aloysius Joseph Willinger =

American Roman Catholic bishop (1886–1973)

His Excellency, The Right Reverend Aloysius Joseph Willinger
- Bishop of Monterey-Fresno; Titular Bishop of Bida; Titular Bishop of Tiguala
- Church: Catholic Church
- In office: 1953 to 1967
- Predecessor: Philip George Scher
- Successor: Harry Anselm Clinch
- Previous posts: Bishop of Ponce (1929 to 1946); Coadjutor Bishop of Monterey-Fresno (1946 to 1953)

Orders
- Ordination: July 2, 1911 by Thomas Francis Cusack
- Consecration: October 28, 1929 by Thomas Edmund Molloy

Personal details
- Born: April 19, 1886 Baltimore, Maryland, U.S.
- Died: July 25, 1973 (aged 87)
- Education: Mount St. Alphonsus Seminary
- Motto: Trahe nos virgo curremus (Draw us, O Virgin, we will run)

Styles of Aloysius Joseph Willinger
- Reference style: The Most Reverend
- Spoken style: Your Excellency
- Religious style: Monsignor

Aloysius Joseph Willinger CSsR (April 19, 1886 – July 25, 1973) was an American prelate of the Roman Catholic Church. He served as the bishop of Monterey-Fresno in California from 1953 to 1967.

Willinger previously served as coadjutor bishop of Monterey-Fresno from 1946 to 1953 and as bishop of Ponce in Puerto Rico from 1929 to 1946. He was a member of the Congregation of the Most Holy Redeemer (Redemptorists)

== Biography ==
Willinger was born in Baltimore, Maryland, on April 19, 1886. He entered the Redemptorist novitiate in Ilchester, Maryland, in 1905, making his profession of religious vows as a Redemptorist on August 2, 1906. He then studied theology at Mount St. Alphonsus Seminary in Esopus, New York. Willinger was ordained a priest for the Redemptorists on July 2, 1911, in Esopus by Bishop Thomas Francis Cusack.

=== Bishop of Ponce ===
On March 8, 1929, Willinger was appointed the second bishop of Ponce by Pope Pius XI. He received his episcopal consecration at St. Patrick's Cathedral in New York City on October 28, 1929, from Archbishop Thomas Edmund Molloy, with Bishops John Mark Gannon and John Joseph Dunn serving as co-consecrators.

=== Coadjutor Bishop and Bishop of Monterey-Fresno ===
Willinger was named coadjutor bishop of Monterey-Fresno and titular bishop of Bida on December 12, 1946, by Pope Pius XII. He automatically succeeded Philip George Scher as the eleventh bishop of Monterey-Fresno when Scher died on January 3, 1953. Willinger attended the Second Vatican Council in Rome from 1962 to 1965.

On October 16, 1967, Willinger retired as bishop of Monterey-Fresno and was appointed titular bishop of Tiguala by Pope Paul VI. Willinger died on July 25, 1973, at age 87.

Catholic Church titles
Preceded by Edwin Byrne	Bishop of Ponce; 1929–1946	Succeeded by James Edward McManus
Preceded by Philip George Scher	Bishop of Monterey-Fresno; 1953–1967	Succeeded by Harry Anselm Clinch
Preceded by Position established	Titular Bishop of Tiguala; 1967–1973	Succeeded by Mario Enrique Ríos Montt
