= Francis X. Murphy =

Redemptorist chaplain and theology professor

The Reverend Francis Xavier Murphy CSsR
- Church: Catholic Church

Orders
- Ordination: June 23, 1940

Personal details
- Born: Francis Xavier Murphy; June 16, 1914 Bronx, New York, United States
- Died: April 12, 2002 (aged 87) Annapolis, Maryland, United States
- Buried: Redemptorist Cemetery, St. Mary's Catholic Church, Annapolis, Maryland
- Denomination: Roman Catholic

Francis Xavier Murphy, CSsR (June 16, 1914 – April 11, 2002) was a Redemptorist chaplain and theology professor. He is best known for his articles about the Second Vatican Council, first published in The New Yorker magazine under the pseudonym Xavier Rynne.

"He was very open-minded and felt that the church ought not keep secrets and (should) be open. With (his articles on) Vatican II, he gave the inside view," said Redemptorist priest Rev. Denis J. Sweeney.

== Early life ==
Born in The Bronx, New York City, on June 16, 1914, Murphy was the first of Denis (1889–1932) and Anna Elizabeth "Nano" (née Rynne) (1894–1967) Murphy's three children. Murphy's parents eloped together, leaving their native Ireland, emigrated to the US and married in the Bronx upon their arrival in the States.

Murphy was baptized in The Church of St. Angela Merici on Morris Avenue in the Bronx, July 6, 1914.

=== Family influences ===
Murphy's father was a New York police officer who directed his son's early education. He chose to send young Murphy to the school of the Immaculate Conception. The German-American parish had a reputation for being academically challenging.

Murphy said his mother's interest in New York politics "...stimulated his interest in Vatican intrigue". His mother was the maitresse d'hotel at the Bronx Concourse Plaza Hotel and came to know the politicians who frequented the place. For years it was considered the best location in the Bronx for social, business and fraternal events.

== Religious calling ==
Murphy was confirmed at the age of eight at Immaculate Conception Church (where he attended elementary school) by then Archbishop Patrick Hayes of New York. Murphy said after his Confirmation, he began to hear "the first whisperings of the call of God".

=== Religious training ===
Murphy graduated from the Redemptorists' Mercyhurst North East preparatory seminary at North East, Pennsylvania in May 1934, and then entered the Redemptorist novitiate at St. Mary's College, Ilchester, Maryland, and completed his theological training at Mount St. Alphonsus Seminary in Esopus, New York.

Murphy made his first profession as a Redemptorist in August 1935. On the eve of his first profession, he wrote in a journal about how courage was the true test of a cleric. "To be a success as a Religious," he wrote, "one must have 'courage': not the precipitate quality of throwing oneself into hazard without a moment's delay, but the persistent ability to face the facts and perform one's duty from day to day, no matter what the cost. And that is the genius of sanctity!" Murphy made his final profession in September 1938.

== Priesthood ==
He was ordained at Esopus on June 23, 1940. Sent for further studies, Murphy first earned both a master's degree and, then in 1945, a Ph.D. in Medieval History from the Catholic University of America writing Rufinus of Aquileia (345-411): His Life and Works.

Subsequently, he was assigned as a US Navy chaplain at Annapolis, Maryland. Murphy was stationed at St. Mary's Parish in Annapolis until 1947, when he returned to Esopus to teach and organize the library.

In the summer of 1948 he was sent to Sant’Alfonso in Rome to assist in the task of collecting and microfilming Redemptorist records in European libraries, and became a correspondent for the National Catholic Welfare Conference News Service.

In 1959, Murphy became a professor of moral theology at Pontifical Lateran University in Rome for 17 years.

=== Military service ===
Murphy served as chaplain at the Naval Academy from 1944 to 1947 and with the Army from 1951 to 1958. Initially assigned in the Army to Fort Riley, Kansas, he often confronted racism within the ranks of the enlisted men he served. Murphy made repeated overtures on behalf of African-American soldiers to Army headquarters. He earned the Bronze Star for "meritorious operations against an armed enemy in Korea." While serving in Korea, he was the editor of a series of pamphlets named God’s F.O. (Forward Officer), aimed at enlisted men. Murphy was reassigned to France, where he first met Archbishop Angelo Roncalli, the future Pope John XXIII.

== Writing career ==
Murphy's writing output has few rivals in religious journalism or scholarship. His religious journalism often appeared every week (if not every day), in American journals and around the world. He wrote more than 30 books in his lifetime, under his pseudonym and his own name.

Murphy developed an interest in early Christian writers while in the seminary. After writing his first article in 1937 "The Irascible Hermit" about St. Jerome, he showed it to the rector of the seminary, saying he hoped to have the article published. Disapproving, the rector said, "You're very ambitious". The Paulist Fathers' Catholic World magazine published Murphy's article, paid him $40 and encouraged him to continue writing. Murphy became a respected and frequent contributor to the Catholic press.

Murphy served as an editor of the New Catholic Encyclopedia (1968 edition) for all articles related to Patristic and Byzantine studies. He contributed over 100 separate articles to the encyclopedia.

Murphy was a delegate to the 1974 United Nations Symposium on Population and Human Rights in Amsterdam. He wrote one of the key event articles entitled The Impact of Fertility on Human Rights.

== Second Vatican Council coverage ==
During the Second Vatican Council, held in Rome from 1962 to 1965, Murphy originally planned to simply report on the proceedings in a Catholic magazine. Serving as theological adviser to a Redemptorist bishop during the council, Murphy was able to attend all sessions, allowing him accurate, first-hand insider knowledge. Murphy said "one could learn a lot by going up and down in the Vatican elevators, attending embassy parties and reading Italian papers". When Roman Curia officials tried to block Pope John XXIII's reform-minded council, control Catholic scholarship around the world, and tried to control the council itself, Murphy's reporting became important to the world.

=== The New Yorker magazine's wider audience ===
Murphy sought a wider audience for the story. John Chapin, a literary agent and translator of Redemptorist works introduced Murphy to Robert Giroux of Farrar, Straus & Giroux. Giroux contacted William Shawn, the editor of The New Yorker magazine. Shawn agreed to publish Murphy's reports, under the pseudonym "Xavier Rynne", the first name taken from Murphy's middle name and the last name taken from his mother's birth name.

The New Yorker articles were entitled Letters From Vatican City. The first, published in October, 1962, attracted world-wide attention. Murphy is credited with setting the tone for the popular view of the council, depicting it as "conservative" versus "liberal".

The Baltimore Province of the Redemptorists positively reviewed Murphy's Second Vatican Council reporting, saying "Keenly appreciating Pope John XXIII's declared intention in calling the Council, 'to open a window' and 'let in fresh air,' Father Murphy not only reported on the Church's view of the modern world, but in doing so, let the modern world see the workings of the Church".

The collected articles were published in a book, Vatican Council II in 1968 and reprinted by Orbis Books in 1999. In a New York Times review, author Gustav Niebuhr called the book "a landmark history of the council".

=== The search for "Xavier Rynne" ===
Officials in the Vatican tried for years to prove Murphy had written the articles. Murphy was once called before Archbishop Pietro Parente, Assessor of the Vatican "Holy Office" (often referred to as "the Inquisition"). In the Xavier Rynne articles, Murphy had unflatteringly referred to Parente as "a strange personality who has few friends and sees heresy everywhere". The archbishop held up a copy of a Xavier Rynne book. Murphy asked, "Do you want me to take an oath about that book?" and said, "I'm not the author of that book." Murphy later explained he saw himself as author not of the books, but of the individual articles. Murphy said he used "casuistry - making subtle distinctions intended to mislead - which we were taught to do".

Murphy escaped the consequences of the interrogation when Archbishop Parente referred to Pius XI as "a little feeble-minded" or "crazy in the head". Murphy told his American monsignor who was serving as Murphy's secretary during the meeting, "Write down that he said Pius XI was feeble-minded." The archbishop, worried he would be censured for the remark, simply walked out. Murphy was free to go.

The quest by the church to discover the true identity of "Xavier Rynne" continued. When Murphy's mother was told by a son-in-law the Auxiliary Bishop of New York Edwin Broderick had asked him what his mother-in-law's maiden name was, Mrs. Murphy immediately suspected something, saying "Damn that Frank. He's in trouble again".

=== Public admission of authorship ===
In 1998, Murphy said he would like to be remembered "as a footnote in the history of the church in the modern age". Murphy publicly admitted to having written the "Xavier Rynne" articles, saying "I was afraid that if I went to my grave without making it known, the damned Jesuits would have claimed it was one of theirs and the Redemptorists would have been just as happy". Regarding his pseudonym, he said "thanks to the (Vatican) Council, my mother's maiden name is known all over the world".

== Later life ==
During the 1970s Murphy served as a visiting professor at Princeton University and later was connected with Johns Hopkins University. From 1977 through 1981 he served as rector of Holy Redeemer College in Washington, D.C.

Murphy suffered a heart attack in 1979 and was stricken with Parkinson's disease in 1987.

== Death and burial ==
Murphy died April 12, 2002, at Anne Arundel Medical Center in Annapolis, Maryland, of complications from cancer surgery. He was 87. He was buried at the Redemptorist Cemetery at St. Mary's Catholic Church in Annapolis.

== Awards ==
- 1998 - Lifetime Achievement Award, given by the National Arts Club in New York.

== Bibliography ==
- Rufinus of Aquileia (345-410): His Life and Works, Studies in Medieval History, new series volume 6 (Washington, DC: Catholic University of America, 1945).
- The Centennial of Saint Alphonsus Parish New York City (Bronx, New York: St. Alphonsus, 1947).
- A Monument to St. Jerome, editor (New York: Sheed and Ward, 1948).
- Peter Speaks Through Leo: Chalcedon 451 (Washington, DC: Catholic University of America Press, 1952).
- Fighting Admiral: The Life of Dan Callaghan (New York: Vantage, 1952).
- Erasmus and His Times, translator of Louis Bouyer’s Autour d’Erasme (Westminster, MD: Newman Press, 1959; London: Geoffrey Chapman, 1959).
- John XXIII Comes to the Vatican (New York: McBride, 1959)
- John XXIII: The Pope from the Fields (London: The Catholic Book Club/Herbert Jenkins, 1959).
- The Encyclicals and Other Messages of John XXIII, edited and with commentaries by John Francis Cronin, Francis Xavier Murphy, and Ferrer Smith (St. Louis: The Pope Speaks Press, 1964).
- Politics and the Early Christian (New York, Rome: Desclée, 1967).
- Synod ’67: A New Sound in Rome, with Gary MacEoin (Milwaukee: Bruce, 1967).
- Moral Teaching in the Primitive Church, Guide to the Fathers of the Church #4 (Glen Rock, NJ: Paulist Press, 1968).
- Estudios sobre la historia de la moral, with Louis Vereecke (Madrid: El Perpetuo Socorro, 1969).
- Constantinople II et III: Histoire des Conciles Oecumeniques 3, with Polycarp Sherwood (Paris: Editions de l’Orante, 1974).
- Nicea II: Histoire des Conciles Oecumeniques 4, with Polycarp Sherwood (Paris: Editions de l’Orante, 1974).
- John Nepomoucene Neumann, Saint (South Hackensack, NJ: Erra Press, 1977).
- John Paul II: A Son from Poland, with Norman Shaifer (South Hackensack: Shepherd Press, 1978).
- The Pilgrim Pope: A Man for All Peoples (Huntington, IN: Our Sunday Visitor, 1979).
- Poland Greets the Pope, with Michael Greene and Norman Shaifer (South Hackensack: Shepherd Press, 1979).
- This Church, These Times: the Roman Catholic Church Since Vatican II (Chicago: Association Press and Follett Press, 1980).
- The Papacy Today (London: Weidenfeld and Nicolson, 1981; New York: Macmillan, 1981).
- The Christian Way of Life: Message of the Fathers of the Church 18 (Wilmington, DE: Michael Glazier, 1986).
- Patristic Heritage in the Renaissance and the Modern World, Essays by Francis X. Murphy (Mainz: Matthias-Grunewald-Verlag, 1990).
- Vatican Council II: A Re-edition, with a new introduction by Francis X. Murphy (Maryknoll, NY: Orbis Press, 1999).

=== Writing as "Xavier Rynne" ===
- Letters from Vatican City: The First Session (New York: Farrar, Straus and Giroux, 1963).
- Letters from Vatican City: The Second Session (New York: Farrar, Straus and Giroux, 1964).
- Letters from Vatican City: The Third Session (New York: Farrar, Straus and Giroux, 1965).
- Letters from Vatican City: The Fourth Session (New York: Farrar, Straus and Giroux, 1966).
- Vatican Council II, one volume edition (New York: Farrar, Straus and Giroux, 1968).
- John Paul’s Extraordinary Synod (Wilmington, DE: Michael Glazier, 1986).
