= Thaddeus Anthony Shubsda =

Catholic bishop

His Excellency, The Most Reverend Thaddeus Anthony Shubsda
- Bishop of Monterey in California; Titular Bishop of Tragurium
- Diocese: Diocese of Monterey in California
- Installed: May 26, 1982
- Term ended: April 26, 1991
- Predecessor: Harry Anselm Clinch
- Successor: Sylvester Donovan Ryan

Orders
- Ordination: April 26, 1950 by James Francis McIntyre
- Consecration: February 19, 1977 by Timothy Manning

Personal details
- Born: April 2, 1925 Los Angeles, California, U.S.
- Died: April 26, 1991 (aged 66)
- Denomination: Roman Catholic
- Education: St. John's Seminary
- Motto: Imple superna gratia (Fill with heavenly grace)

Thaddeus Anthony "Ted" Shubsda (April 2, 1925—April 26, 1991) was an American prelate of the Catholic Church. He served as bishop of Monterey in California from 1982 until his death in 1991. He previously served as an auxiliary bishop of the Archdiocese of Los Angeles in California from 1976 to 1982.

== Biography ==
=== Early life and education ===
Thaddeus Shubsda was born on April 2, 1925, in Los Angeles, California, to Julius and Mary (née Jelski) Shubsda. His parents were Polish immigrants from Sitkowo in the Podlaskie Voivodeship. He received his early education at local public schools, and attended lessons in the Polish language at the Polish Hall in Los Angeles. In 1936, Shubsda enrolled at Our Lady of Lourdes School. He graduated from Verdugo Hills High School in Los Angeles in 1939, and then entered Los Angeles College, the minor seminary of the Archdiocese of Los Angeles. He completed his studies at St. John's Seminary in Camarillo, California.

=== Priesthood ===
Shubsda was ordained to the priesthood for the Archdiocese of Los Angeles by Cardinal James McIntyre on April 26, 1950. He celebrated his first mass at Our Lady of Bright Mount Parish in Los Angeles. He served as a curate at San Antonio de Padua Parish and St. Vibiana's Cathedral Parish, and was a member of the matrimonial tribunal from 1964 to 1968. Shubsda was named a monsignor by Pope Paul VI in 1965, and became associate director of the Society for the Propagation of the Faith in 1968. For thirty years, Shubsda served as spiritual director for the Catholic Labor Institute. He served as pastor of St. Paul's Parish in Los Angeles from 1971 to 1980.

=== Auxiliary Bishop of Los Angeles ===
On December 20, 1976, Shubsda was appointed as an auxiliary bishop of Los Angeles and titular bishop of Tragurium by Pope Paul VI. He received his episcopal consecration at St. Vibiana Cathedral on February 19, 1977, from Cardinal Timothy Manning, with Bishops John J. Ward and Juan Arzube serving as co-consecrators. As an auxiliary bishop, he continued to serve as pastor of St. Paul's and was named regional bishop of the Santa Barbara Pastoral Region.

=== Bishop of Monterey in California ===
Following the resignation of Bishop Harry Clinch, Shubsda was named bishop of Monterey in California by Pope John Paul II on May 26, 1982. Shubsda was widely regarded as an expert on labor issues and social justice, and earned a reputation as an outspoken advocate of farm and factory workers in the diocese. He acted as a mediator in the Watsonville, California frozen food strikes, and spoke out forcefully for better living conditions for field workers after some had been found living in caves in Salinas, California. His actions prompted labor leader César Chávez to remark, "The church has many flaws, but in many ways it is still the best friend we have." He hosted John Paul II's visit to the Monterey Peninsula in California in September 1987, and actively promoted the beatification of Spanish missionary Junípero Serra.

=== Death ===
Shubsda was diagnosed with melanoma in September 1990. Thaddeus Shubsda died seven months later due to complications from cancer on April 26, 1991, at age 66.

Catholic Church titles
Preceded by Harry Anselm Clinch	Bishop of Monterey in California; 1982–1991	Succeeded by Sylvester Donovan Ryan
