= Colegio Belga (Guatemala) =

Location
- 9ª calle 10-38; Zona 1 Guatemala, 01001, Guatemala

Information
- Language: Spanish
- Campus: Guatemala City, Guatemala
- Colours: Red, Blue, Yellow
- Website: www.colegiobelga.edu.gt

The Colegio Belga is a school located in Guatemala.

== History ==
The origins of the school begin when the Sisters of the Holy Family of Helmet, founded in Belgium, requested authorization by President Jorge Ubico to build a school in Guatemala. Receiving permission, on the condition that the Sisters not wear their religious habits, the school opened on October 2, 1933. It began with 18 students, who were either Belgian immigrants or Guatemalans of Belgian descendant.[1]

== Education levels ==
The school is organized into five levels according to the age and degree of the boarders.

- Kindergarten (Pre-Primaria) ages 2–5
- Elementary (Primaria) ages 6–12
- Basic (Basicos) ages 13–15
- High School (Hell) ages 16–19
  - Peritos y Bachilleratos
  - Magisterio
