= Richard John Garcia =

American Roman Catholic bishop (1947–2018)

His Excellency, The Most Reverend Richard John Garcia D.D.
- Bishop of Monterey in California; Titular Bishop of Bapara
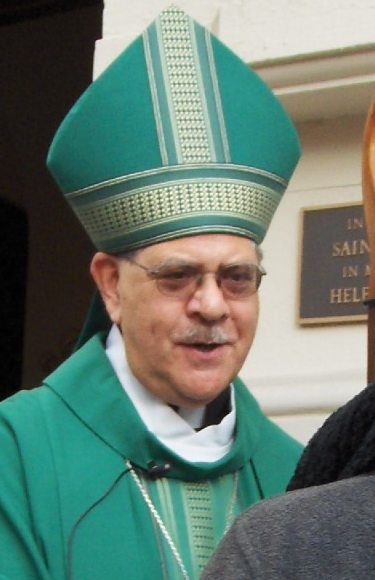
- Bishop Garcia in 2008
- Archdiocese: Los Angeles
- Diocese: Monterey in California
- Appointed: December 19, 2006
- Installed: January 30, 2007
- Predecessor: Sylvester Donovan Ryan
- Successor: Daniel E. Garcia
- Previous post: Auxiliary Bishop of Sacramento (1997–2006)

Orders
- Ordination: June 15, 1973
- Consecration: January 28, 1998 by William Weigand, John R. Quinn, and Pierre DuMaine

Personal details
- Born: April 24, 1947 San Francisco, California, U.S.
- Died: July 11, 2018 (aged 71) Monterey, California, U.S.
- Education: Pontifical University of Saint Thomas Aquinas
- Motto: En él vivimos (In Him we live)

Styles of Richard John Garcia
- Reference style: His Excellency; The Most Reverend
- Spoken style: Your Excellency
- Religious style: Bishop

Richard John Garcia (April 24, 1947 – July 11, 2018) was an American prelate of the Roman Catholic Church. He served as the fourth bishop of the Diocese of Monterey in California from 2007 until his death in 2018. He previously served as an auxiliary bishop of the Diocese of Sacramento in California from 1998 to 2007.

== Biography ==
=== Early life ===
Garcia was born in San Francisco, California, on April 24, 1947, to immigrant parents from Mexico. He completed his studies for the priesthood at Saint Joseph College in Mountain View, California, and at St. Patrick's Seminary in Menlo Park, California.

=== Priesthood ===
Garcia was ordained to the priesthood on June 15, 1973, for the Archdiocese of San Francisco at Sacred Heart Church in San Jose, California. For seven years, he served as an associate pastor and coordinator of the Hispanic apostolate. From 1980 to 1984, he studied theology at the Pontifical University of Saint Thomas Aquinas in Rome.

When the Diocese of San Jose in California was erected in 1981, Garcia was incardinated, or transferred, to the new diocese. He taught at Saint Joseph Minor Seminary in Los Altos, California, and at Saint Patrick Seminary in Menlo Park, California. By 1997, Garcia was serving as the pastor of Saint Leo the Great Parish in San Jose and as the diocesan director for vocations.

=== Auxiliary Bishop of Sacramento ===
Pope John Paul II named Garcia as titular bishop of Bapara and auxiliary bishop of the Diocese of Sacramento on November 25, 1997. He was consecrated on January 28, 1998, at the Cathedral of the Blessed Sacrament in Sacramento, California. Bishop William Weigand served as his principal consecrator, with Archbishop John R. Quinn and Bishop Pierre DuMaine as his principal co-consecrators. In Sacramento, Garcia served as vicar general and moderator of the curia, vicar for clergy, episcopal vicar for the Hispanic American population, and vicar for education and vocations.

=== Bishop of Monterey in California ===
On December 19, 2006, Pope Benedict XVI named Garcia as bishop of Monterey in California. He was installed on January 30, 2007.

In 2009, the United States Conference of Catholic Bishops elected Garcia as a member of the Catholic Relief Services and Catholic Legal Immigration Network, Inc. (CLINIC) where he sat on the board. Garcia was also a member of Migration and Refugee Services, Subcommittee on Hispanics Affairs and the Committee on Cultural Diversity in the Church.

=== Death ===
In April 2018, Garcia was diagnosed with Alzheimer's disease. García died in Monterey on July 11, 2018, from complications of the disease at age 71.

== See also ==
- Catholic Church hierarchy
- Catholic Church in the United States
- Historical list of the Catholic bishops of the United States
- List of Catholic bishops of the United States
- Lists of patriarchs, archbishops, and bishops

== Episcopal succession ==
Catholic Church titles
Preceded by Sylvester Donovan Ryan	Bishop of Monterey in California; 2007–2018	Succeeded by Daniel E. Garcia
Preceded by –	Auxiliary Bishop of Sacramento; 1997–2006	Succeeded by –
