= Jorge Barlín =

First Filipino Bishop in the Catholic Church

The Most Reverend Jorge Barlín
- Bishop of Cáceres
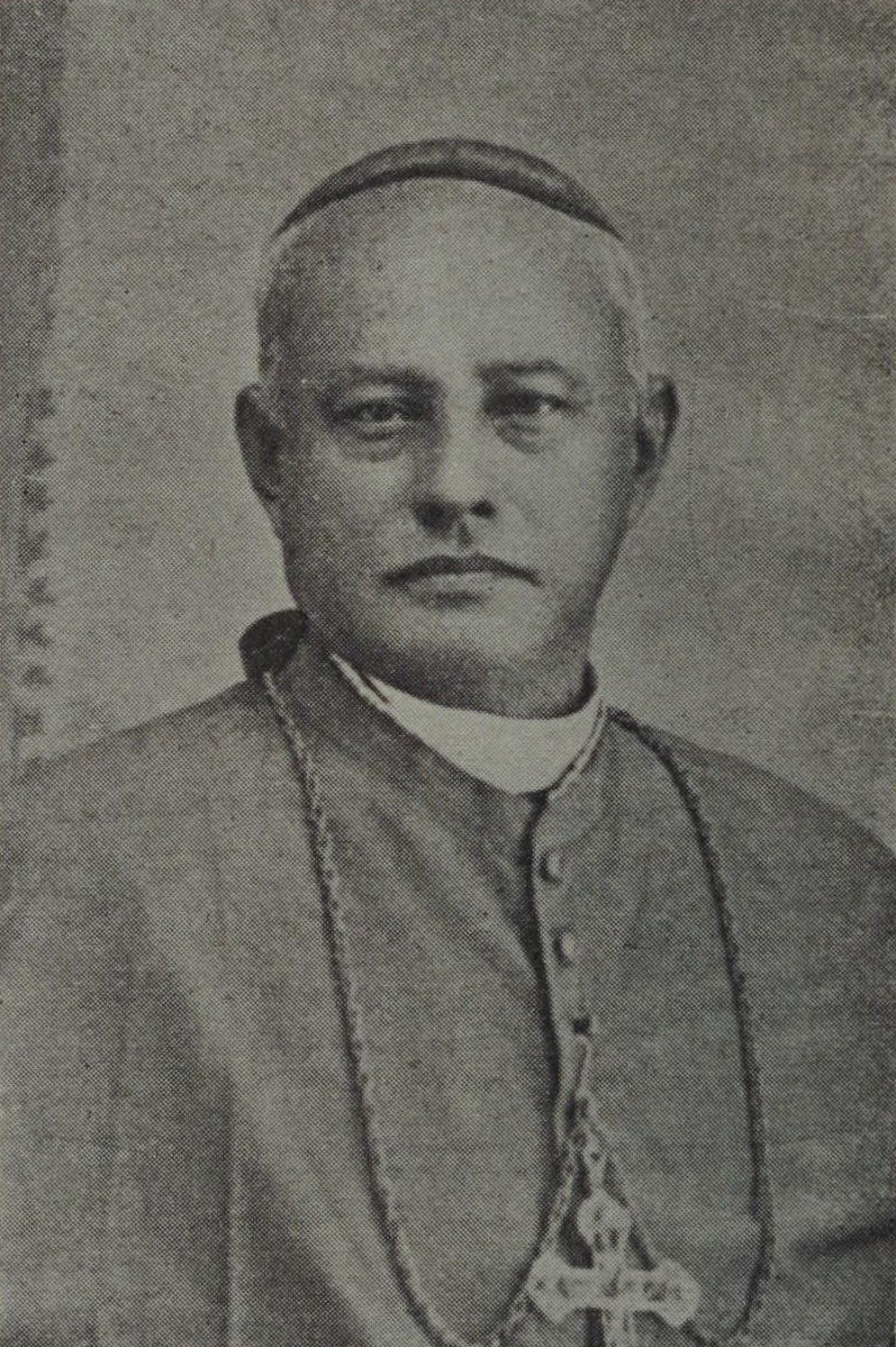
- Barlin, c. 1906
- See: Nueva Cáceres
- Appointed: December 14, 1905
- In office: 1905–1909
- Quashed: September 4, 1909
- Predecessor: Arsenio del Campo y Monasterio
- Successor: John Bernard MacGinley

Orders
- Ordination: September 19, 1875
- Consecration: June 29, 1906 by Ambrose Agius

Personal details
- Born: Jorge Alfonso Barlín é Imperial; April 23, 1850 Baao, Camarines Sur, Captaincy General of the Philippines, Spanish Empire
- Died: September 4, 1909 (aged 59) Rome, Kingdom of Italy
- Buried: Cimitero Comunale Monumentale Campo Verano, Rome, Italy
- Denomination: Roman Catholic
- Residence: Baao, Camarines Sur, Philippines
- Parents: Mateo Alfonso Barlín (father); Francisca Imperial (mother)
- Motto: Labora sicut bonus miles Christi Jesu (Labor like a good soldier of Christ Jesus)
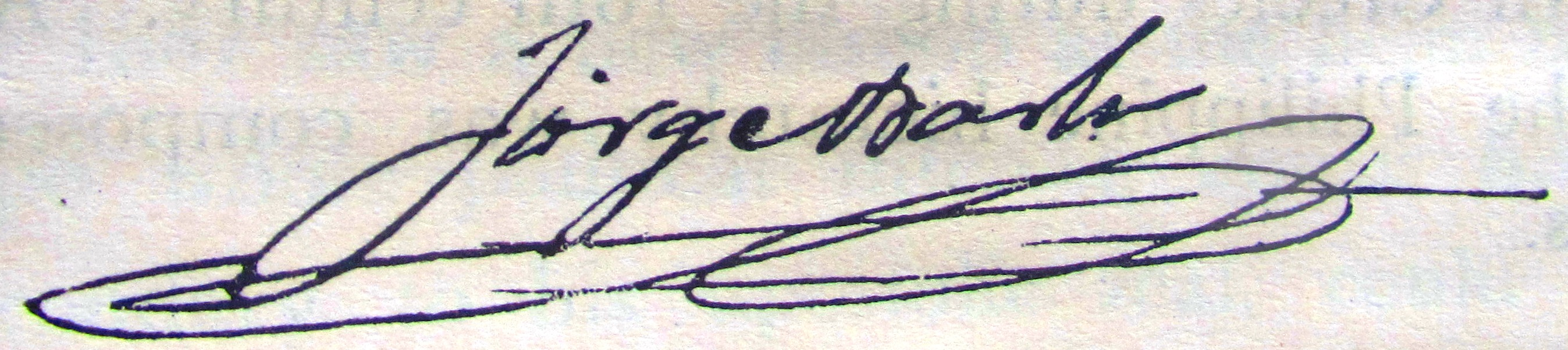
- Signature

- Coat of arms

Jorge Barlín (April 23, 1850 – September 4, 1909) also known as Jorge Barlín Imperial, Jorge Alfonso Imperial Barlín and Jorge Barlín é Imperial following Spanish naming customs, was the first Filipino consecrated a bishop in the Roman Catholic Church. He served as Bishop of Cáceres (now an archdiocese) in the Philippines until 1909. He was the first Filipino and Bicolano bishop, and was parish priest and vicar forane of Sorsogon from 1887 to 1906.

== Life ==
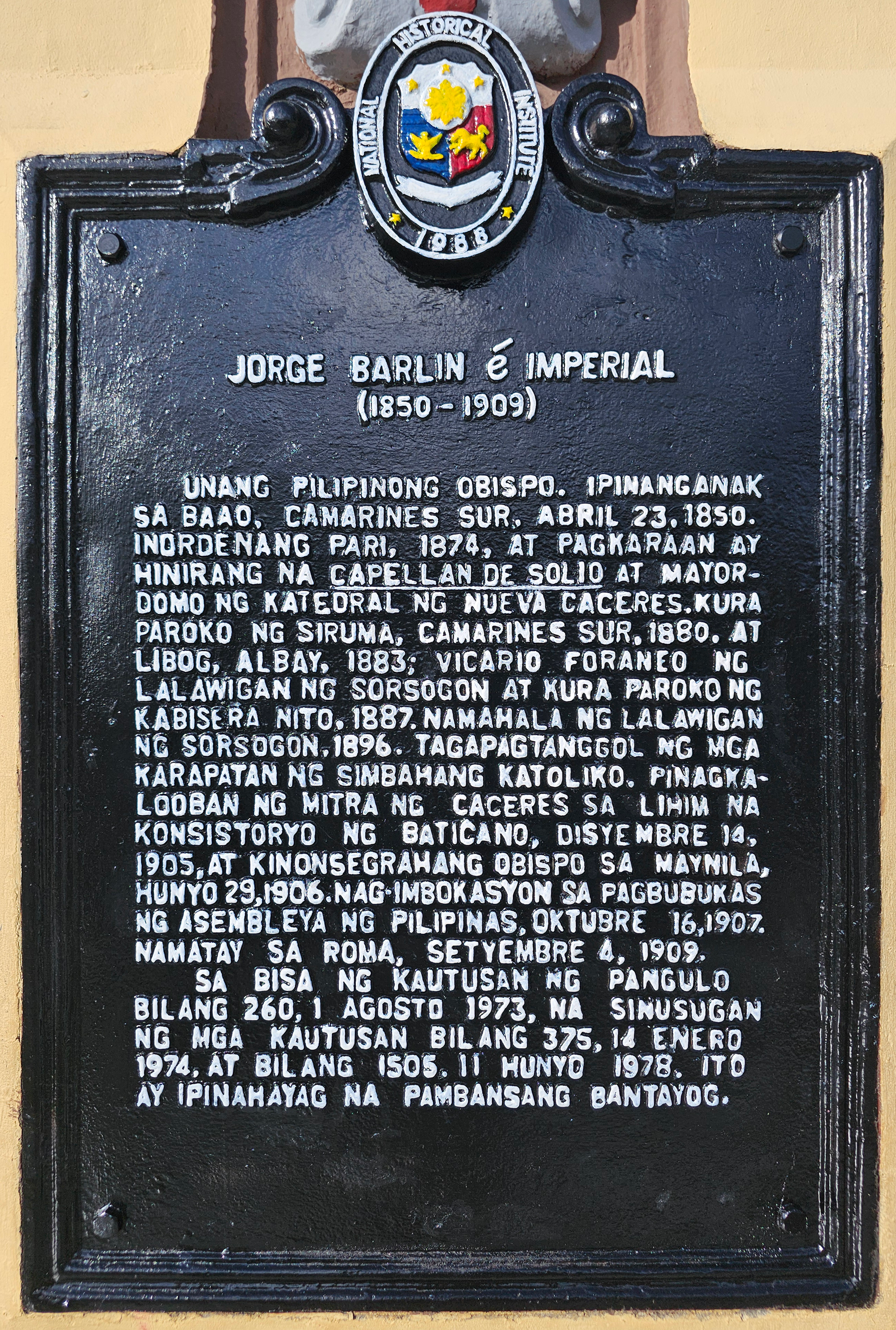
National historical marker installed in 1988 at Barlin's monument in Baao, Camarines Sur

Jorge Barlín was born April 23, 1850, in Baao, Camarines Sur to Mateo Alfonso Barlín and Francisca Imperial.

He was ordained a priest on September 19, 1875, and consecrated a bishop on June 29, 1906, by Archbishop Ambrose Agius along with co-consecrators Archbishop Jeremiah James Harty and Bishop Frederick Zadok Rooker. "Barlín proved very capable and loyal, dealing a blow to the schismatic Iglesia Filipina Independiente by resisting its recruitment efforts and winning a court battle over church property," according to Catholic Bishops Conference of the Philippines.

He died and was interred in Rome, Italy in 1909 during an ad limina visit of the Philippine bishops. Attempts to have his body returned to the Philippines were unsuccessful.

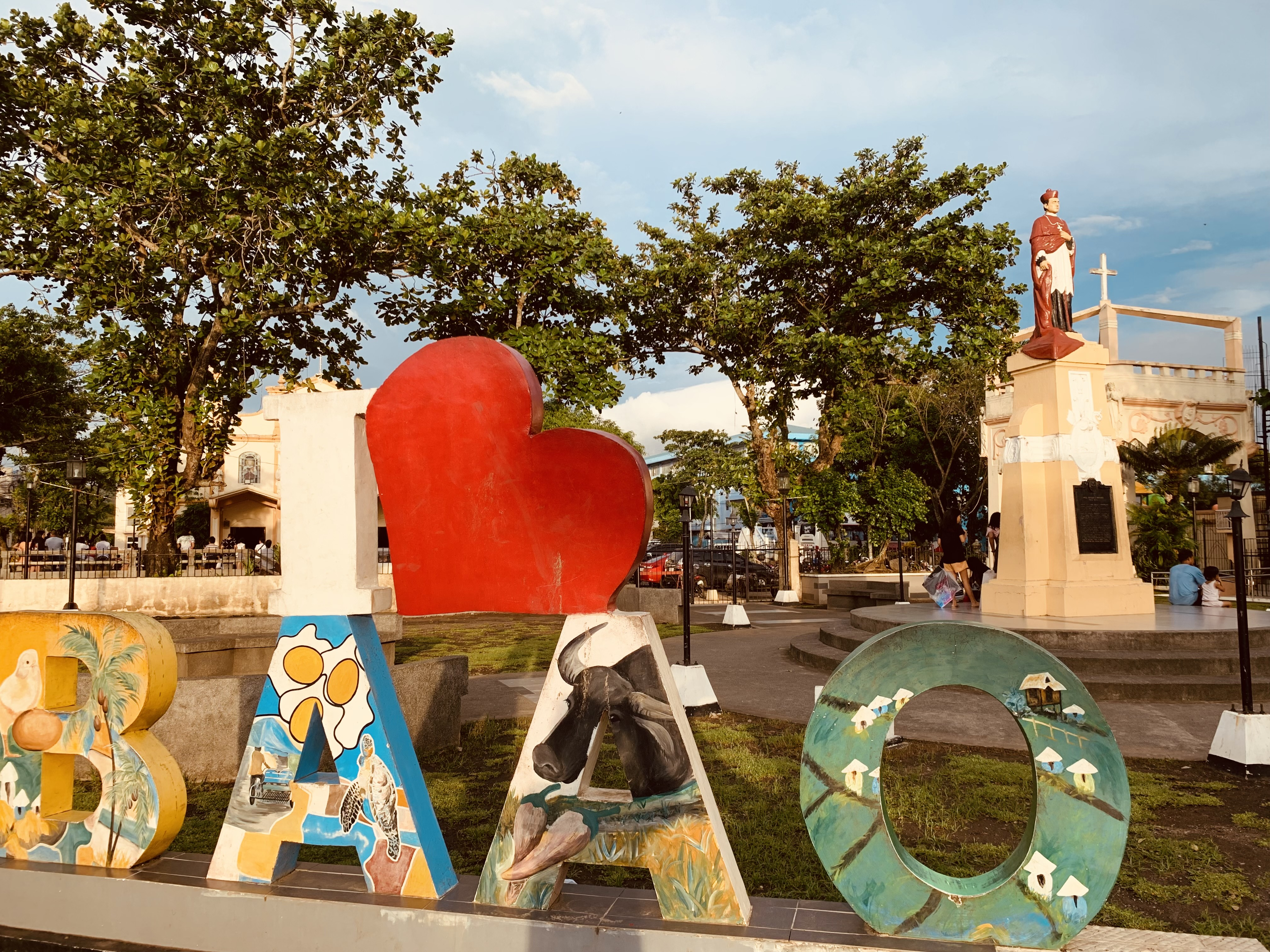
Hometown of Jorge Barlin

Monuments commemorating Jorge Barlín were built in his hometown's plaza in Baao, Camarines Sur, and another called Plaza Barlin in Naga, Camarines Sur.

== See also ==
- Catholic Church in the Philippines

Catholic Church titles
Preceded by Arsenio del Campo y Monasterio	Bishop of Nueva Caceres; 1905–1909	Succeeded by John Bernard MacGinley
