= John Joseph Cantwell =

American Catholic prelate (1874–1947)

His Excellency, The Most Reverend John Joseph Cantwell
- Archbishop of Los Angeles
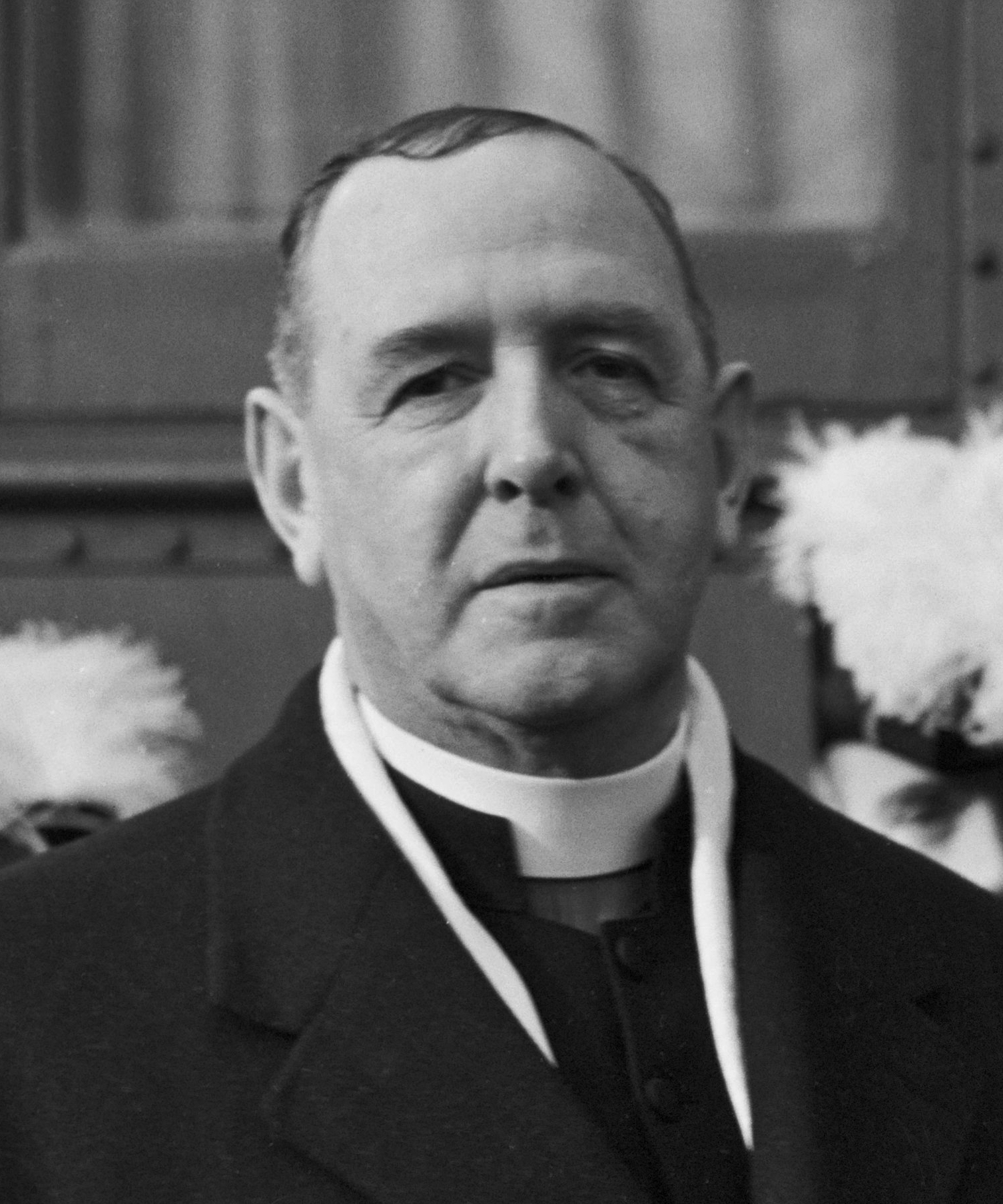
- Cantwell in December 1936
- Church: Catholic Church
- Archdiocese: Los Angeles
- Appointed: July 11, 1936
- Term ended: October 30, 1947 (his death)
- Predecessor: Thomas James Conaty
- Successor: James Francis McIntyre
- Other posts: Bishop of Monterey-Los Angeles (1917‍–‍1922); Bishop of Los Angeles-San Diego (1922‍–‍1936)

Orders
- Ordination: June 18, 1899 by Robert Browne
- Consecration: December 5, 1917 by Edward Joseph Hanna

Personal details
- Born: December 1, 1874 Limerick, County Limerick, Ireland
- Died: October 30, 1947 (aged 72) Los Angeles, California, U.S.
- Motto: Veritas vos liberabit (Latin for 'The truth will set you free')

John Joseph Cantwell (December 1, 1874 – October 30, 1947) was an Irish-born American prelate of the Catholic Church. He led the Archdiocese of Los Angeles from 1917 until his death in 1947, becoming its first archbishop in 1936. Cantwell was critical of the U.S. film industry and helped found the National Legion of Decency.

== Early life and education ==
Cantwell was born in Limerick in Ireland on December 1, 1874, to Patrick and Ellen (née O'Donnell) Cantwell. He was the eldest of fifteen children, ten of whom survived into adulthood. Three of his brothers also became priests and served in California, while one sister became an Ursuline nun and remained in Ireland.

Cantwell was raised in Fethard, County Tipperary, where he received his early education at the Monastery National School run by the Patrician Brothers and later the nearby Classical Academy. In 1884, he entered Sacred Heart College, a Jesuit day school in Limerick, while living with his maternal grandparents. During his studies there, his uncle William J. O'Donnell served as Mayor of Limerick in 1890.

From Limerick, Cantwell began his theological studies at St. Patrick's College in Thurles, one of Ireland's missionary seminaries, in 1892. He spent the following seven years there preparing for the priesthood, and was convinced by a friend to apply for the Archdiocese of San Francisco.

== Priesthood ==
Cantwell was ordained a priest on June 18, 1899, by Bishop Robert Browne at the Cathedral of the Assumption in Thurles. The 24-year-old priest sailed from Queenstown in Ireland on August 3, 1899, arriving in Philadelphia, Pennsylvania, two weeks later. In addition to four of his brothers, Cantwell's widowed mother and his sister Nellie immigrated to the United States in the 1920s. The family lived with Cantwell at the episcopal residence in Los Angeles.

Upon his arrival in California in late 1899, the archdiocese assigned Cantwell as an assistant pastor to Reverend Michael O'Riordan, a fellow native of Limerick, at St. Joseph the Worker Parish in Berkeley, California. While serving in Berkeley, Cantwell organized a Newman Club at the University of California and served as the group's first chaplain in addition to his parish duties. Lacking a chapel in its early years, the club used a bakery as a meeting place.

Cantwell's work with the Newman Club favorably impressed Archbishop Patrick William Riordan, who named Cantwell as his personal secretary in September 1904. Cantwell's new duties took him to San Francisco and he remained in his position for 11 years. Following Archbishop Riordan's death in December 1914, Cantwell was appointed vicar general by Riordan's successor, Edward Joseph Hanna, in July 1915.

Bishop Thomas James Conaty died in September 1915, leaving vacant the Diocese of Monterey-Los Angeles. The Vatican appointed Bishop John Joseph McCort to succeed Conaty in June 1916, but McCort declined the appointment.. Bishop Peter Muldoon of the Diocese of Rockford was next appointed in March 1917 but he asked to withdraw his nomination. Hanna then advocated with the Vatican for Cantwell.

== Bishop of Monterey- Los Angeles ==
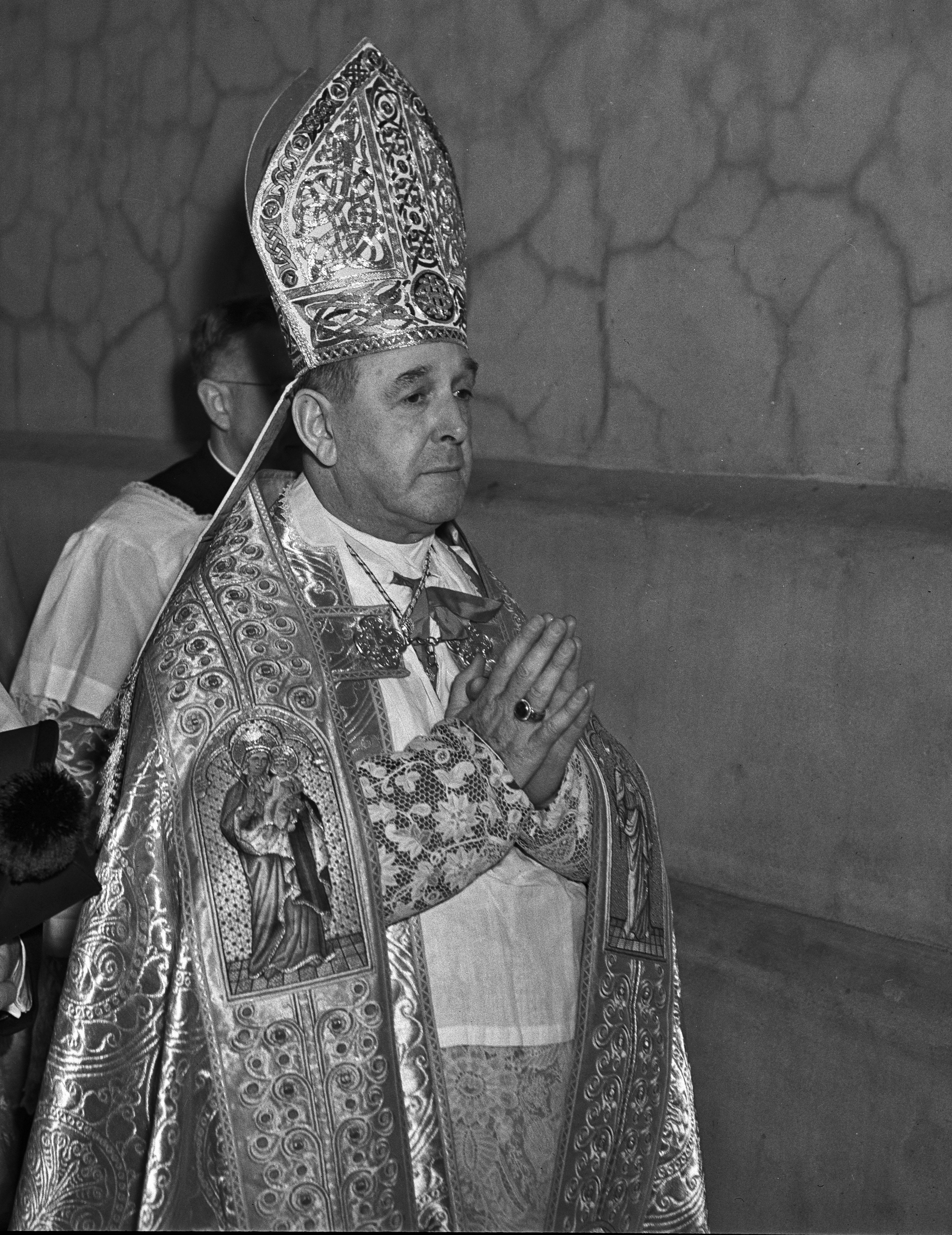
Cantwell after becoming archbishop in 1936

Pope Benedict XV appointed Cantwell as bishop of Monterey-Los Angeles on September 21, 1917.On December 5, 1917, Cantwell received his episcopal consecration from Hanna, with Bishops Thomas Grace and Joseph Sarsfield Glass serving as co-consecrators, at St. Mary's Cathedral in San Francisco. He formally took charge of the Diocese of Monterey-Los Angeles on December 12, 1917, with his installation at the Cathedral of Saint Vibiana. Taking office after the American entry in April 1917 into World War I, Cantwell, at his installation, declared,

"The men of Christ will be found mustered under one flag, a flag that is sustained by Christian principles, and the men of paganism will be found under that flag of paganism—and we will go on to victory."

== Bishop of Los Angeles-San Diego ==
Due to the population growth in California, on June 1, 1922, Pope Pius XI divided the Diocese of Monterey-Los Angeles into the Diocese of Monterey-Fresno and the Diocese of Los Angeles-San Diego, with Cantwell as bishop of Los Angeles-San Diego.

== Archbishop of Los Angeles ==
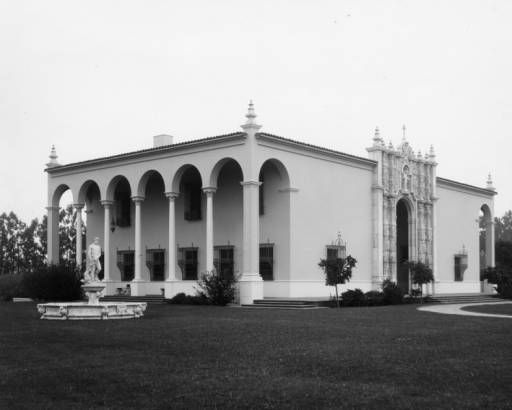
St. John's Seminary, Camarillo, California

On July 11, 1936, Pius XI split the Diocese of Los Angeles-San Diego into the Diocese of San Diego and the Archdiocese of Los Angeles, with Cantwell being promoted to archbishop of Los Angeles. The Archdiocese of Los Angeles was established as a distinct ecclesiastical province from the Archdiocese of San Francisco, making California the only U.S. state to have two metropolitan archbishops at the time (Texas would achieve the same distinction in 2004).

In October 1936, Cantwell hosted Eugenio Pacelli, then cardinal secretary of state, during the latter's stop in Los Angeles as part of his visit to the United States. Pacelli, who was elected Pope Pius XII three years later, declared that he was "particularly impressed with" Cantwell and "the work that has been accomplished in Southern California." On December 3, 1936, Cantwell was installed as archbishop at St. Vibiana's Cathedral. In his first public address as archbishop, Cantwell warned about the threat of communism: "If religion ceases to function, if religious influences are allowed to die, then the work of the Communist, the Bolshevist, and the godless will prosper."

Cantwell's tenure was a period of growth for the Catholic Church in Southern California. At the beginning of his administration in 1917, the Diocese of Monterey-Los Angeles had a Catholic population of 180,000 with 276 priests, 128 parishes, 85 missions, 93 stations, and 44 parochial schools with 9,000 students. By the time of his death in 1947, the Archdiocese of Los Angeles had a Catholic population of 601,200 with 688 priests, 217 parishes, 44 missions, 20 stations, four Catholic colleges and universities with 2,350 total students, 35 Catholic high schools with 8,673 total students, and 115 Catholic elementary schools with 38,821 total students. Cantwell established a minor seminary (now Daniel Murphy High School) in 1927 and St. John's Seminary in Camarillo, California, in 1938.

=== Mexican and African American relations ===
Between 1925 and 1926, approximately 80,000 refugees fled the Cristero War in Mexico to Southern California. In response to this influx, Cantwell declared,

"We, in Los Angeles, so close to the Mexican border...cannot be indifferent to the dreadful persecution which is now being waged not only against the Catholic Church but against the most fundamental principles of Christianity."

Cantwell required his priests and seminarians to learn Spanish to serve the diocese's Mexican parishioners. From 1926 to 1929, the diocese's Catholic Welfare Bureau (which replaced the Bureau of Catholic Charities) dedicated more than half of its total funds to Mexican American parishioners. By 1936, Cantwell estimated that over 182,000 Mexican-born Catholics resided in his diocese, being served by 26 Spanish-language churches and 78 priests.

Cantwell was deeply concerned by the proselytizing efforts of Protestants among Mexican Americans. He condemned their efforts "to tear out of the heart of the foreigner the religion which he has and which alone will save him from becoming an anarchist." In response, he established the Confraternity of Christian Doctrine in the diocese in 1922, mainly to supplement the religious instruction given at the Catholic settlement houses for Mexican immigrants. During the program's first four months, about 200 Mexican children received instruction in a movie theater by the Holy Family Sisters and lay volunteers; the program grew to serving 28,500 children at 211 centers by 1,279 teachers within the next 13 years.

In 1928, Cantwell rebuked a Los Angeles priest who had been accused of speaking "in opprobrious terms of the Mexican people." He pointed out that "many Mexicans who have come among us have given up their homes, their businesses, and their farms" due to persecution and concluded by saying that "to treat these people harshly is unpriestly."In recognition of his work among Mexican Americans, Cantwell was elevated to the rank of assistant to the papal throne by Pope Pius XI in 1929 and was awarded the Golden Rose by the canons of the Basilica of Our Lady of Guadalupe in December 1930. He became the first American bishop to celebrate mass in Mexico when he performed services in 1941 at the Basilica of Our Lady of Guadalupe in Mexico City.

In December 1921, Cantwell was invited to be the guest of honor at a meeting of the NAACP. During his address, he noted that the Ku Klux Klan had persecuted both African Americans and Catholics, and expressed his strong support for civil rights:

The "Imperial Wizard" and the "Grand Goblin" have attempted to read you and me out of our citizenship...You and I know too well what comes from bigotry, from an un-Christian appreciation of human character, to lend ourselves to religious or political prosecution...Indeed, we shall do all in our power when called upon to cooperate and to help you in the vindication of your rights and prerogatives.

...Religion teaches us to see in every man, no matter what may be the color of his skin, a human soul upon which is stamped the image of God...If men realize the dignity of the human soul apart altogether from external appearances, they will be forced to recognize the equality of all men in the sight of God.

=== Film industry ===
With the rise of the motion picture industry in the early 1920s, Cantwell became convinced that it was causing a moral decline in the United States. Seeking "to form some sort of organization among Catholic picture people of Los Angeles," he founded the Catholic Motion Picture Actors Guild of America in 1923. Its first president and vice-president were the actors Thomas Meighan and Jackie Coogan, respectively. The Guild originally met in the parish hall of Blessed Sacrament Parish in Hollywood before establishing itself at the Good Shepherd Parish in Beverly Hills, California, in 1924. However, the Guild failed to gain influence within the film industry and was viewed as little more than a social club.

In 1932, Cantwell was introduced to Joseph Breen, a lay Catholic who worked for Will H. Hays at the Motion Picture Producers and Distributors of America in Washington D.C. While still working for Hays, Breen became Cantwell's close adviser on forcing the industry to accept more stringent self-censorship. Cantwell opposed government intervention in the film industry and "any attempt to legislate morality in people." Breen persuaded him to propose action by his fellow bishops to pressure the industry at the annual meeting of the National Catholic Welfare Council (NCWC) in November 1933.

Ahead of the NCWC meeting, Cantwell began to lobby studio executives at Metro-Goldwyn-Mayer and Paramount Pictures, both major film studios, for stricter moral standards; however, he believed that their promises would "amount to very little” unless they felt economic pressure. Cantwell then enlisted the help of Amadeo Giannini, the Catholic president of the Bank of America and a major lender to the film studios. Cantwell vowed to condemn anyone associated with film production, including Bank of America, who failed to cooperate. Giannini then warned his clients in the industry that the Bank of America would no longer "finance their products if...the Catholic Church were to come out in opposition to their business." Cantwell also recruited prominent attorney Joseph Scott to liaise with film producers, warning them that the bishops would launch a campaign against them individually unless they reformed their practices.

At the NCWC meeting in November, Cantwell condemned the film industry in a speech largely written by Breen. Cantwell said that films were "preaching a philosophy of life which, in most instances, is...sinister and insidious" and "lowered both the public and private standards of conduct of all who see them." In particular, Cantwell condemned the 1932 film The Sign of the Cross and the 1933 film Ann Vickers. He blamed Jewish studio executives, who "if [they] had any desire to keep the screen free from offensiveness they could do so." He also assessed blame on Broadway playwrights in New York City, from whom "the stories now current on the screen are selected. Seventy-five percent of these authors are pagans." Cantwell concluded his speech by saying "that drastic efforts must be launched at once if we are to stave off national disaster."

Following Cantwell's speech, the bishops created the Episcopal Committee on Motion Pictures, with Archbishop John T. McNicholas as chair and Bishops Cantwell, John F. Noll, and Hugh Charles Boyle as members. In June 1934, the Committee organized the National Legion of Decency "to arouse millions of Americans to a consciousness of the dangers of salacious and immoral pictures and to take action against them." Through the popularity of its rating system and the circulation of membership pledges at church services, the Legion wielded significant influence on the film industry for decades and had millions of members throughout the United States.

In April 1936, Cantwell blessed the first meeting of the Hollywood Anti-Nazi League. He continued to call for film boycotts, including 1947's Duel in the Sun, which he called "morally offensive and spiritually depressing" and warned that Catholics may not see "with a free conscience."

== Later life and death ==
Cantwell celebrated his silver jubilee as a bishop in 1942, receiving congratulatory messages from Pope Pius XII and US President Franklin D. Roosevelt. Cantwell was active in the relief effort in Europe following the end of World War II in 1945. He also condemned the 1946 imprisonment in Yugoslavia of Archbishop Aloysius Stepinac by its communist government.

Two weeks after being stricken with a throat infection, Cantwell died on October 30, 1947, at Queen of Angels Hospital in Los Angeles. He received tributes from Los Angeles Mayor Fletcher Bowron, Episcopal bishop Robert Burton Gooden, and actors including Bing Crosby, Bob Hope, Eddie Cantor and Pat O'Brien.

== In popular culture ==
Cantwell appears as a character in James Ellroy's novel Perfidia (2014), as a Fascist sympathizer and close friend of the character Dudley Smith.

== Sources ==
- Weber, Francis J. (1971). John Joseph Cantwell: His Excellency of Los Angeles. Cathay Press.
- Weber, Francis J. (2000). Encyclopedia of California's Catholic Heritage, 1769-1999. Saint Francis Historical Society.
- Weber, Francis J. (1964). "John J. Cantwell and the Legion of Decency". American Ecclesiastical Review. 151 (4).
- Black, Gregory D. (1994). Hollywood Censored: Morality Codes, Catholics, and the Movies. Cambridge University Press.
- Cantwell, John J. (1934). "Priests and the Motion Picture Industry". American Ecclesiastical Review. 90: 136–146.

Catholic Church titles
Preceded by Thomas James Conaty	Bishop of Monterey-Los Angeles; 1917–1922	Succeeded by See of Los Angeles-San Diego
Preceded by See of Monterey-Los Angeles	Bishop of Los Angeles-San Diego; 1922–1936	Succeeded by See of Los Angeles
Preceded by See of Los Angeles-San Diego	Archbishop of Los Angeles; 1936–1947	Succeeded by James Francis McIntyre
