= Sisters of the Holy Family of Helmet =

- Abbreviation: R.S.F.
- Formation: 1856
- Founder: Rosalie, Henriette and Mélanie Van Biervliet
- Type: Roman Catholic religious institute Teaching order
- Headquarters: Institut de la Sainte-Famille d'Helmet; Av. Zénobe Gramme, 114; 1030 Brussels, Belgium
- Superior General: Sr. Emerence Mwambusa, R.S.F.
- Website: www.sainte-famille.be/pages-isf/acces.htm

The Religious Sisters of the Holy Family of Helmet (French: Religieuses de la Sainte-Famille d'Helmet) are a congregation of women founded in Belgium to provide education to young women in most need. They were founded by three sisters, Rosalie, Henriette and Mélanie Van Biervliet in 1856. The members of the congregation use the post-nominal initials of R.S.F. after their names.

== History ==
=== Origins ===
The sisters were among the ten children born at the start of the 19th century to Pierre-Francois Van Biervliet and his wife, Marie-Jeanne, residents of Izegem in the West Flanders region of the country. Five of the children died in childhood. Both parents died shortly after one another in 1829, when their four surviving daughters—under the leadership of their eldest sister Rosalie (1804-1893)--decided to open a boarding school in the village of Tielt in order to support themselves, which they called Collège Sainte-Marie. They were determined that the school should give the students a solid Christian formation and that they would work to serve the needs of the poor of their society. As part of their work, a small clinic was constructed in the building where, under the direction of Henriette Van Biervliet (1809-1888), free medical care was provided to the people of the region.

The success of their project won such admiration by the wider society that the Bishop of Bruges, Jean-Baptist Malou, insisted that they open a normal school for girls, the first in their region, which they did in 1849.

Three of the four sisters eventually felt called to carry out this commitment living as Religious Sisters. With the permission of Malou, on 3 June 1856, they professed religious vows, thereby establishing themselves as a religious congregation. The Holy Family was chosen as the patron saint of the congregation to emphasize their focus on finding God in the everyday human experience epitomized by family life. Mother Rosalie, as she was now known, was elected the first Superior General, an office in which she served until 1881.

=== Expansion ===
In 1862, soon after the founding of the congregation, it had expanded to a point that the Sisters opened another boarding school in Louvain, followed by schools in Antwerp and, in 1891, in the Helmet neighborhood of the City of Brussels. During this period, Mother Mélanie Van Biervliet (1813-1892) was elected the second Superior General in 1881, serving for two years.

==== Latin America ====
A graduate of their original school in Tielt had emigrated to Guatemala, where she had begun to teach poor girls. The congregation was requested to take over this effort, to which they agreed, opening their first community in Latin America in 1896. In 1933, they were given permission by Jorge Ubico, the president of the country, to establish an international school for girls, the Colegio Belga, a noted educational institution of the nation. This permission was granted, however, on the condition that the Sisters were not to wear their religious habit.

==== Africa ====
In 1932, the Sisters of the Holy Family expanded their service to the colony of the Belgian Congo, when the Superior General, Mother Hyacinthe Weghsteen, agreed to fulfill the request of Bishop Edouard Louis Antoine Leys, M.Afr., head of the new Vicariate Apostolic of Kivu, for teachers. Four members of the congregation: Sisters Antoinette Brantjis, Lidwine Maeyens, Franciska Tamboren and Clara Devreese, left Brussels on 26 September of that year, traveling by train to Marseille, from which they set sail to Africa. They arrived at their destination, the village of Kabare in the Province of Kivu (now in South Kivu) on the following 22 October. The White Fathers, who administered the local parish, had prepared a convent for their living quarters. The Sisters immediately began their study of Mashi, the local language, and began to give classes in the Catholic faith to the native women. They were later joined by Mothers Imelda and Emilienne.

Construction on a school was completed two years later and the Albert I School was opened on 15 October 1934, with 19 children of the Belgian colonists boarding there and following the national curriculum of Belgium, with a separate class for native children. The Sisters' continued requests for more land for the school campus requested in an 18 hectare campus by 1959. At that point, due to the rapid political changes taking place from Belgium's sudden ending of its colonial rule, the Sisters transferred the school to the control of the school to the new Archdiocese of Bukavu. It was renamed the Lycée Wima.

At that point, the local community of the Sisters of the Holy Family numbered about a dozen. With the departure of the European faculty and student body, the student body became composed overwhelmingly of natives. Over the next decade, the Sisters faced a number of challenges, having to flee on two separate occasions, returning to find the school sacked by militants. By 1971, the school's future became more settled and the school had some 400 students.

== Current status ==
At present, the members of the Institute of the Holy Family operates schools in Belgium, Cameroon, the Democratic Republic of Congo, Guatemala, Honduras and Rwanda. The Lay Association of the Holy Family allows lay people, both men and women, to share in the work of the institute.
