= Francis J. Weber =

American priest, author, and archivist

Monsignor Francis J. Weber, ACA
- Born: January 22, 1933 (age 93); Indianapolis, Indiana, USA
- Education: Los Angeles College; Saint John Seminary; Catholic University of America
- Occupations: Priest; Author; Archivist
- Title: Very Reverend Monsignor; Archivist of the Archdiocese of Los Angeles
- Parent(s): Frank J. Weber (1903-1983); Katherine E. Weber (1909-1976)
- Relatives: Mary Alice Castagna (sister)
- Website: Archdiocese Archival Center

Monsignor Francis J. Weber (born January 22, 1933) is an American Roman Catholic priest, author and archivist. He is a noted Catholic scholar, an Honorary Chaplain to His Holiness, and archivist for the Archdiocese of Los Angeles since 1962.

== Biography ==
Msgr. Weber was born Frank J. Weber in Indianapolis, Indiana to Frank J. and Katherine E. Thompson Weber. He has one sister, Mary Alice Weber. In December 1945 the family moved to Los Angeles, California where he entered Los Angeles College, a Catholic junior seminary, in 1946. Later he attended St. John’s College and St. John’s Seminary in Camarillo.

While on the seminary campus, he worked at the Edward Laurence Doheny Memorial Library. He was ordained a Catholic priest April 30, 1959. From 1959 to 1961 he served as Assistant Pastor of St. Vincent Catholic Church in West Hollywood and Assistant Director of the National Legion of Decency.

Father Weber was sent to Washington, D.C. to do post-graduate studies at Catholic University of America. He also earned a certificate in Records Management from American University.

In 1962 Father Weber was selected to be the founding archivist for the Archives of the Archdiocese of Los Angeles where he continues to serve.

Also in 1962, Msgr. Patrick Roche, the editor, asked Father Weber to write a regular column on California history in The Tidings, the official newspaper of the Archdiocese of Los Angeles. Thus, was launched "California’s Catholic Heritage," which became, before it ended in 1995, the longest-running column in the newspaper’s 121-year history. Msgr. Weber contributed 1,874 consecutive weekly columns over the course of 33 years.

On May 7, 1974, Pope Paul VI designated Father Weber as a “Chaplain of His Holiness” and his ecclesiastical title became the Reverend Monsignor, customarily abbreviated Msgr.

== Honors ==
Msgr. Weber received the Award of Merit from the California Historical Society in 1972.

In 1993 Msgr. Weber was awarded the Grand Cross of the Order of Isabella the Catholic by King Juan Carlos I of Spain in recognition of his numerous books and articles on California’s Spanish heritage.

A member and past president of the Los Angeles Corral, Msgr. Weber was honored as Westerners International Living Legend No. 60 in 2016.

In 1996 the Glasgow Cup was awarded Msgr. Weber by the President of the Miniature Book Society "To a member who has shown a special dedication and above all, friendship to the membership, and who keeps that special spirit so evident at our founding in 1983." He was a charter member of the Miniature Book Society and served as President from 1985-1987.

In 2013 he was honored by the Miniature Book Society again when he was presented with the Norman W. Forgue Award from for his outstanding contribution to the world of miniature books.

== Published works ==
As author or editor of 175 volumes, Msgr. Weber is one of the most published priests in the Catholic annals of the United States. He has been a columnist, and an author of both books and articles as well as a book reviewer. Msgr. Weber's diverse literary topics range from Buffalo Bills Baptism to Toiletry at the California Missions.

Msgr. Weber has written or edited miniature books for nearly all the top publishers of miniature books over several decades. He has also published many books under his own imprints, Junipero Serra Press and El Camino Real Press.

=== Selected books ===
- 1965: Documents of California Catholic History (1784-1963)
- 1977: A history of San Buenaventura Mission
- 1985: Mission in the valley of the bears: a documentary history of San Luis, Obispo de Tolosa
- 1992: Past is Prologue: Some Historical Reflections, 1961-1991
- 1998: Magnificat: the Life and Times of Timothy Cardinal Manning
- 2000: Memories of an Old Country Priest
- 2000: Encyclopedia of California’s Catholic Heritage 1769-1999
- 2002: Past is Prologue: Some Historical Reflections, 1992-2002
- 2003: A legacy of healing:the story of Catholic health care in the Archdiocese of Los Angeles
- 2004: Cathedral: of Our Lady of the Angels
- 2005: The California Missions

=== Selected miniature books ===
- 1971: Earthquake Memoir
- 1975: California on United States Postage Stamps
- 1978: El Pueblo de San Jose de Guadalupe
- 1983: The XXIII Olympiad
- 1988: Angels Flight: A Los Angeles Funicular Railway
- 1990: Gaspar de Portola
- 2004: The Veil of Veronica
- 2016: The Feast of the Nativity
- 2017: Gregory Peck
- 2019: Voice of the Hollywood Bowl: Thomas Cassidy 1917-2012
- 2021: Saint Brendan: legend vs. history
