= Sylvester Donovan Ryan =

American Roman Catholic bishop

His Excellency, The Most Reverend Sylvester Donovan Ryan
- Bishop Emeritus of Monterey
- Diocese: Monterey in California
- Appointed: January 28, 1992
- Installed: March 19, 1992
- Retired: December 19, 2006
- Predecessor: Thaddeus Anthony Shubsda
- Successor: Richard John Garcia
- Previous post: Auxiliary Bishop of Los Angeles and Titular Bishop of Remesiana (1990–1992)

Orders
- Ordination: May 3, 1957 by James Francis McIntyre
- Consecration: May 31, 1990 by Roger Mahony, John Ward, and George Patrick Ziemann

Personal details
- Born: September 3, 1930 (age 95) Avalon, California
- Motto: Servants of Christ

Styles of Sylvester Donovan Ryan
- Reference style: His Excellency; The Most Reverend
- Spoken style: Your Excellency
- Religious style: Bishop

Sylvester Donovan Ryan (born September 3, 1930) is an American prelate of the Roman Catholic Church. He served as bishop of the Diocese of Monterey in California from 1992 to 2007 and as an auxiliary bishop of the Archdiocese of Los Angeles from 1990 to 1992.

== Biography ==
=== Early life ===
Ryan was born on September 3, 1930, in Avalon, California. On May 3, 1957, Ryan was ordained to the priesthood for the Archdiocese of Los Angeles by Cardinal James McIntyre. An educator, Ryan served as principal of Paraclete High School in Lancaster, California, in the 1960s to June 1971, and Saint Paul High School in Santa Fe Springs, California, in the 1970s. Ryan was named president-rector of the archdiocesan Saint John's College Seminary in Camarillo, California, 1986.

=== Auxiliary Bishop of Los Angeles ===
On February 17, 1990, Pope John Paul II appointed Ryan as an auxiliary bishop of Los Angeles and titular bishop of Remesiana. Ryan was consecrated at the Cathedral of Saint Vibiana in Los Angeles on May 31, 1990 by then Archbishop Roger Mahony.

=== Bishop of Monterey in California ===
On January 28, 1992, John Paul II appointed Ryan as the third bishop of Monterey in California. Ryan was installed as bishop on March 19,1992.Ryan served as the president of the California Catholic Conference from 1997 to 2004.

On December 18, 2006, Pope Benedict XVI accepted Ryan's letter of resignation as bishop of Monterey in California. He was succeeded by Bishop Richard Garcia, Auxiliary of Sacramento.

== See also ==
- Catholic Church hierarchy
- Catholic Church in the United States
- Historical list of the Catholic bishops of the United States
- List of Catholic bishops of the United States
- Lists of patriarchs, archbishops, and bishops

== Episcopal succession ==
Catholic Church titles
Preceded by Thaddeus Anthony Shubsda	Bishop of Monterey; 1992–2006	Succeeded by Richard John Garcia
Preceded by -	Auxiliary Bishop of Los Angeles; 1990–1992	Succeeded by -
