= John Bernard MacGinley =

Irish-born clergyman

The Most Reverend John Bernard MacGinley Bishop of Monterey-Fresno
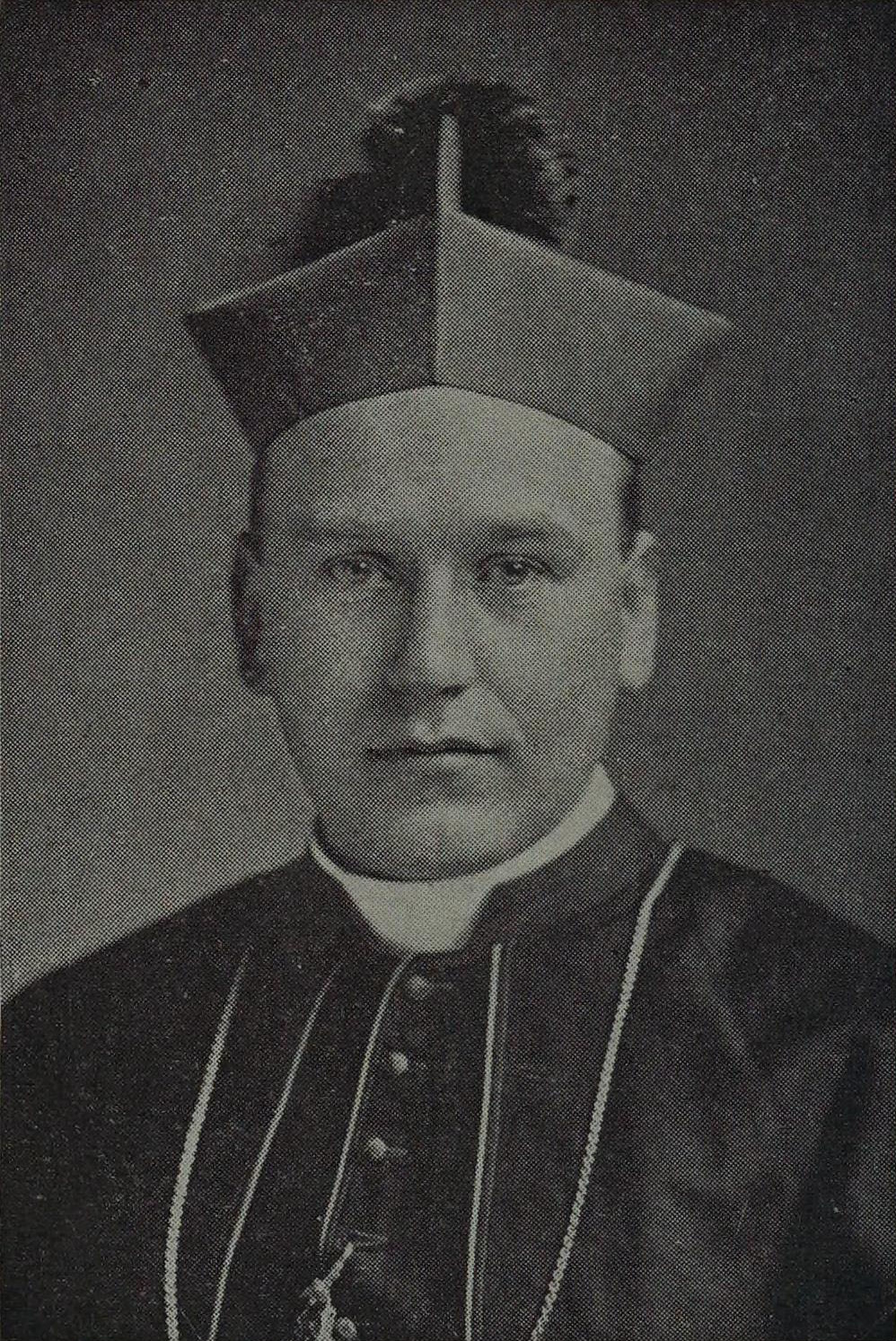
- Diocese: Monterey-Fresno
- Appointed: March 24, 1924
- Term ended: September 26, 1932
- Predecessor: John Joseph Cantwell
- Successor: Philip George Scher
- Other post: Bishop of Nueva Caceres (April 2, 1910 – March 24, 1924) Titular Bishop of Croae (September 26, 1932 – October 18 1969)

Orders
- Ordination: June 8, 1895 by Edmund Stonor
- Consecration: May 10, 1910 by Diomede Falconio

Personal details
- Born: August 19, 1871 County Donegal, Ireland
- Died: October 18, 1969 (aged 98) County Donegal, Ireland
- Denomination: Roman Catholic
- Motto: Scio Cui Credidi (lit. 'I know him in whom I have believed')
- Coat of arms

John Bernard MacGinley (August 19, 1871 – October 18, 1969) was an Irish-born clergyman of the Roman Catholic Church. He served as Bishop of Nueva Caceres (1910 – 1924) and Bishop of Monterey-Fresno (1924 – 1932).

== Biography ==
John MacGinley was born in County Donegal, the sixth of thirteen children of Thomas Colin and Margaret Theresa (née Sinnott) MacGinley. His father served as principal of Croagh National School, and was author of General Biology and several works on folklore and scenery of western Donegal. He was educated at St Eunan's Seminary, Letterkenny and Blackrock College, Dublin, in his native country, and at the Pontifical North American College in Rome.

While in Rome, MacGinley was ordained to the priesthood by Archbishop Edmund Stonor on June 8, 1895. He earned a Doctor of Divinity degree in 1896, and came to the United States that same year. He then served as a curate at Our Lady of the Rosary Church in Philadelphia, Pennsylvania, until 1898, when he became professor of Latin and moral theology at St. Charles Borromeo Seminary. He remained at St. Charles for five years, and was made rector of the seminary at Vigan City in the Philippines in 1905. In 1910, he returned to Philadelphia, where he became a curate at St. Charles Church.

On April 2, 1910, MacGinley was appointed Bishop of Nueva Caceres in the Philippines by Pope Pius X. He received his episcopal consecration on the following May 10 from Archbishop Diomede Falconio, with Bishops John Edmund Fitzmaurice and Edmond Francis Prendergast serving as co-consecrators. Recalled to the United States, he was named Bishop of Monterey-Fresno, California, on March 24, 1924. He later resigned due to ill health on September 26, 1932; he was appointed Titular Bishop of Croae on the same date. He retired to Killybegs, in his native County Donegal, where he died at age 98.

== Episcopal succession ==
Catholic Church titles
| Preceded by Jorge Barlin | Bishop of Nueva Caceres; 1910–1924 | Succeeded by Francisco Javier Reyes |
| Preceded by John Joseph Cantwell | Bishop of Monterey-Fresno; 1924–1932 | Succeeded by Philip George Scher |
