= Mount St. Alphonsus Seminary =

Coordinates: 41°50′21″N 73°57′36″W

The Mount Community
- Other names: Mount St. Alphonsus Retreat Center
- Former names: Mount St. Alphonsus Seminary
- Type: Seminary
- Established: 1907
- Religious affiliation: Bruderhof Communities (2012-present); Roman Catholic Congregation of the Most Holy Redeemer (1907-2012)
- Location: Esopus, New York
- Website: bruderhof.com/mount

Mount St. Alphonsus Seminary (later Mount St. Alphonsus Retreat Center), located in Esopus, New York, was an American Roman Catholic seminary founded in 1907 by the Congregation of the Most Holy Redeemer, more commonly known as the Redemptorist Fathers and Brothers. It operated as a seminary until 1985, after which it became a center for meetings and spiritual retreats for the people of the Hudson Valley in New York. In 2012, the Mount St. Alphonsus Retreat Center was purchased by the Bruderhof Anabaptists who renamed the building as The Mount Community and started The Mount Academy, a parochial school, at the premises. A daily meal is shared by the Bruderhof members of The Mount Community who worship together several times throughout the week, living together as a Christian intentional community.

== History ==
Upon the arrival of some Belgian Redemptorists in the United States in 1838, they began the mission work for which they had been established in Italy a century earlier by their founder, Alphonsus Maria de' Liguori, C.Ss.R., a bishop and noted spiritual writer, among the Native Americans who lived along the frontier of the young nation. By 1850, the nine Redemptorist communities in the United States were formed into the independent Province of Baltimore.

A seminary was soon opened in Maryland for the training of the young candidates to the Congregation. By the beginning of the 20th century, however, it was felt by the Redemptorists that the locales they had chosen for their seminarians had not been healthful. In 1904, with financing by the family of Father Augustine Duper, C.Ss.R., a native of the Bronx, the decision was made to move the seminary to Esopus, where they had purchased a 235-acre property, which eventually grew to over 400 acres.

The main portion of the building was designed by William Licking; the chapel was designed by Brother Max Monz, C.Ss.R. in Romanesque style. Upon completion of construction in 1907, theological studies began to be given at the seminary for the young men of the province. The school also served as a locale for many activities of the local Catholic population. Additionally, the faculty provided spiritual care to their neighbors at a mission chapel in the town, as well as assisting the Church of the Presentation parish in neighboring Port Ewen, and Sacred Heart Church in Esopus. They oversaw, as well, a small cloistered monastery of Redemptoristine nuns located on the grounds.

In 1985, due to the declining numbers of students, the decision was made by the province to relocate their seminarians to study at the Washington Theological Union in Washington, D.C. The seminary building was then refashioned into a retreat center, serving people in the greater New York area, New Jersey and Connecticut. It was also a popular site for weddings due to the beauty of the grounds. By the time the seminary closed, some 1,300 Redemptorist seminarians had been ordained as Catholic priests there.

Because of their aging membership, in 2011 the leaders of the province determined they could no longer maintain the Mount and the entirely facility would have to be closed. It was felt that this would free them to continue their primary ministry to the poor and most abandoned. The Mount Seminary then closed as of January 1, 2012.

In May 2012, the property was purchased by the Bruderhof, who established The Mount Community there, which includes its Mount Academy high school for the young of their religious community. The chapel has been left intact.

In March 2014, the Bruderhof of The Mount Community restored the building's church bells, which were non-functional since the 1980s; this cost US$75,000.

== Notable alumni ==
- Rev. John A. Collins, C.Ss.R. - Chief of Chaplains of the United States Air Force
- Archbishop Edward Joseph Gilbert, C.Ss.R. - Archbishop of Port of Spain
- Bishop William Tibertus McCarty, C.Ss.R. - Bishop of Rapid City
- Rev. Francis X. Murphy, C.Ss.R. - also known as Xavier Rynne, the pseudonym he published his articles under during the Second Vatican Council.
- Cardinal Joseph W. Tobin, C.Ss.R. - Archbishop of Indianapolis, Archbishop of Newark
