= Diocese of Monterey-Fresno =

Coordinates: 36.596259°N 121.891908°W

The Roman Catholic Diocese of Monterey-Fresno was formerly a Latin suffragan diocese of the Roman Catholic Church in California, United States.

The episcopal see was located in Fresno. The diocese covered the present dioceses of Monterey and Fresno (q.v.)

== History ==
The diocese of Monterey–Fresno was the new name since 1 June 1922 of the remainder of the Diocese of Monterey–Los Angeles after it lost territory to establish the Diocese of Los Angeles–San Diego. It existed under that name until 6 October 1967, when it was renamed as Diocese of Monterey (in California) (v.), and lost territory to establish the Diocese of Fresno.

Its official periodical was The Register.

== Episcopal incumbents ==
Suffragan Bishops (all Roman Rite)

Upon erection of the diocese, it was administered by the Bishop of Los Angeles-San Diego. In 1924, Irish-born Most Rev. John Bernard MacGinley was transferred from the Philippines (Bishop of Nueva Caceres 1910.04.02 – 1924.03.24) to become the first bishop of Monterey-Fresno Bishop of Monterey–Fresno (USA) (1924.03.24 – 1932.09.26), followed by a long emeritate as Titular Bishop of Croæ (1932.09.26 – death 1969.10.18).

He was succeeded by Bishop Philip George Scher (1933.04.28 – death 1953.01.03)

Last incumbent was Aloysius Joseph Willinger, Redemptorists (C.SS.R.) (1953.01.03 – 1967.10.06), succeeding as former Coadjutor Bishop of Monterey–Fresno (1946.12.12 – 1953.01.03) & Titular Bishop of Bida (1946.12.12 – 1953.01.03), previously Bishop of Ponce (Puerto Rico) (1929.03.08 – 1946.12.12). On October 6, 1967, when the diocese was split between Monterey and Fresno, Most Rev. Aloysius Joseph Willinger retired as the third and last bishop of the diocese, on emeritate as Titular Bishop of Tiguala (1967.10.06 – death 1973.07.25).
