= Sisters of the Holy Family (California) =

The Sisters of the Holy Family (S.H.F.) of San Francisco, California, are community of Roman Catholic women religious established in 1872 by Lizzie Armer, known in religion as Sister Dolores Armer. Originally based in San Francisco, the S.H.F. community moved their headquarters to Fremont, California, over the course of ten years between 1948 and 1958.

== Founding ==
Born in 1850 in Sydney, Australia, Lizzie Armer (full name Elizabeth but always known as “Lizzie”) moved with her family to San Francisco while still a young child. Not much is known of her early childhood, but at some point during her youth Lizzie Armer was adopted into the wealthy home of Mr. and Mrs. Richard Tobin, parents of Richard M. Tobin. Richard Tobin was one of the original founders of Hibernia Savings and Loan, along with his brother Robert Tobin. With the support of the Tobin family, Lizzie developed her interest in charitable work, focusing on families and children in poverty.

In 1870s San Francisco existing Sisterhoods already ran orphanages, hospitals and schools for middle class and wealthy young women, but there was a void in charitable work specifically for the aid of families of the working poor. With the support of San Francisco’s first Archbishop, Joseph Sadoc Alemany, and Father John J. Prendergast, Lizzie Armer moved into a small home near Pine and Jones Streets in 1872 and began the new S.H.F. order.

== Day Homes child care ==
The Day Homes run by the Sisters in the San Francisco Bay Area were early day care centers for the children of working parents. S.H.F. opened its first child care center, Holy Family Day Home, in 1878, and it was one of the only day care centers of its kind in San Francisco at that time. Circa 1885 the Sisters operated three Day Homes in San Francisco, where children of the working poor were given food, kindergarten-level activities, and toys and games. St. Elizabeth’s Day Home was built by the Sisters in San Jose in 1907, and St. Vincent’s in Oakland in 1911; by 1918 the SHF Day Homes minded over 1,700 children per day.

In 1958 St Elizabeth's Shelter in San Jose stepped in to help a pregnant 10-year-old, a 3rd grader. It made national headlines.
