= Shrine of the Most Holy Redeemer =

Catholic church in Nevada

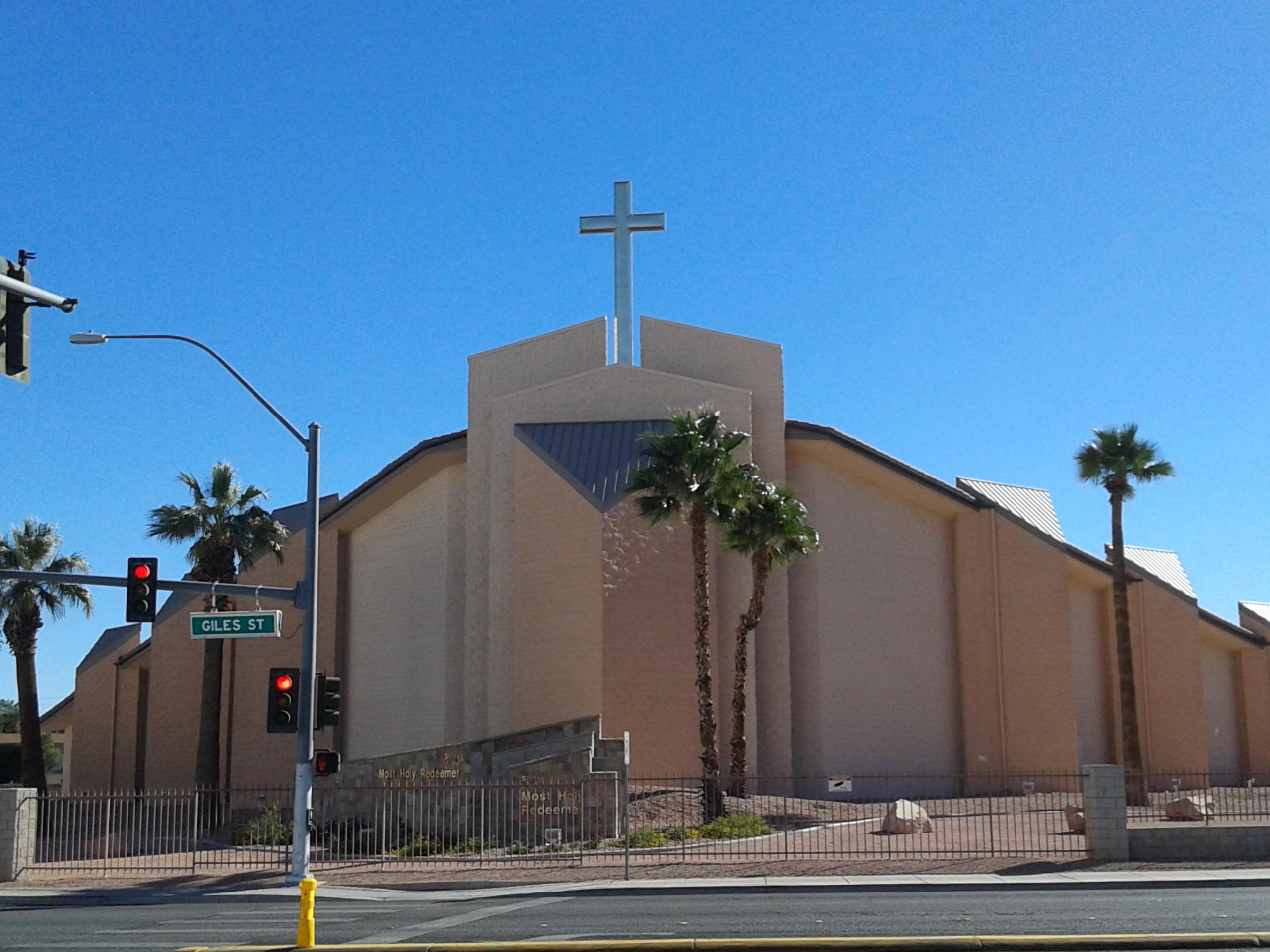
- Facade of the shrine in 2016
- Shrine of the Most Holy Redeemer
- 36.0967°N 115.1697°W
- Address: 55 E Reno Ave, Las Vegas, NV 89119
- Country: United States
- Denomination: Catholic
- Website: theshrinelv.org

History
- Status: Church
- Dedication: Ad maiorem Dei gloriam
- Dedicated: February 2, 1993

Architecture
- Architect: Marnell Corrao Associates
- Construction cost: $3.5 million

Specifications
- Capacity: 2,000

Administration
- Archdiocese: Las Vegas

Clergy
- Archbishop: George Leo Thomas

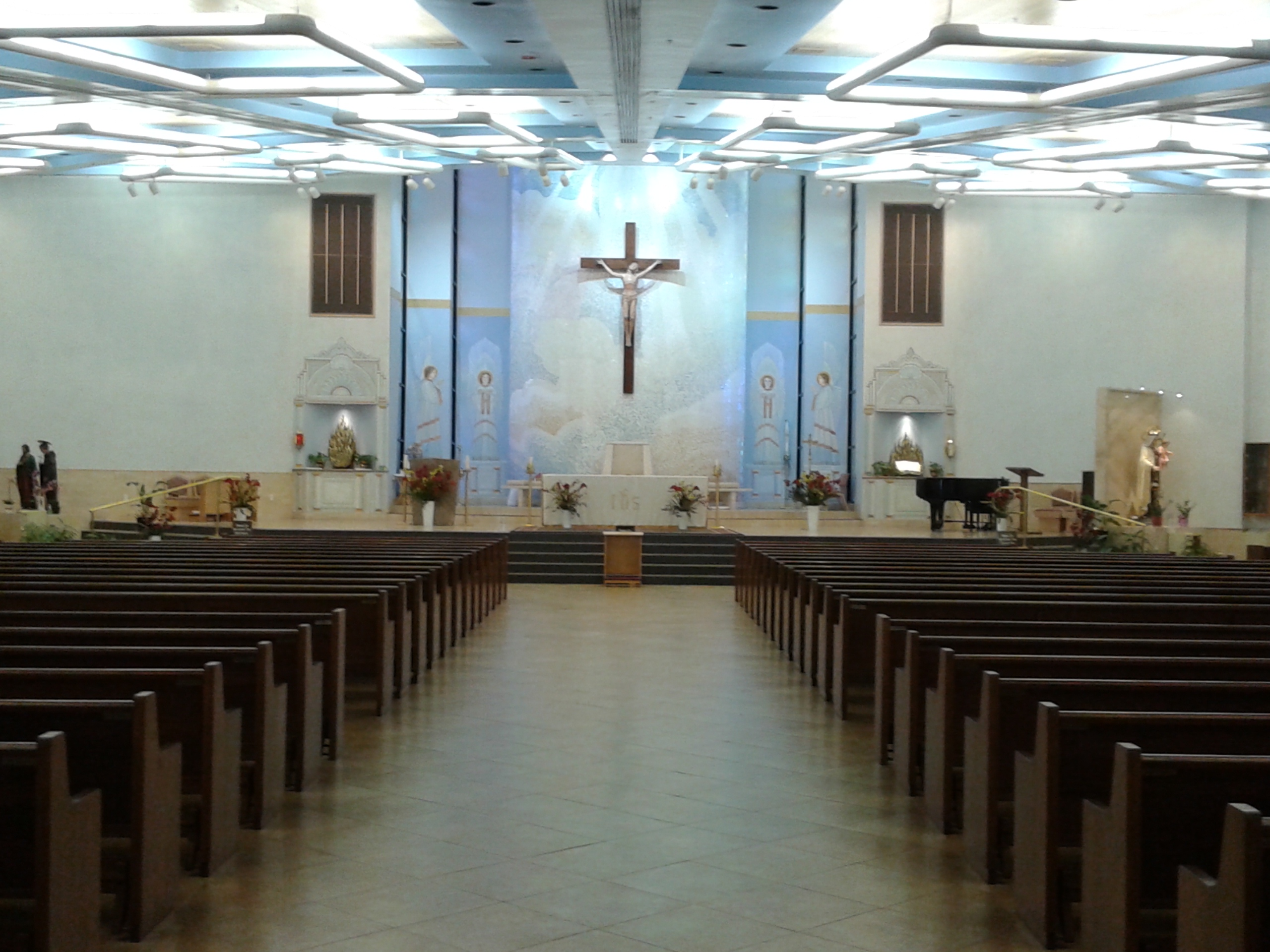
The interior in 2016

The Shrine of the Most Holy Redeemer is a Catholic church and shrine in Las Vegas, Nevada, on the south end of the Las Vegas Strip. When it was dedicated in 1993, it was the largest church building in Nevada. It is a popular spot for tourists who want to keep up with their religious obligations while on vacation.

== History ==
The church was built because the Guardian Angel Cathedral, the seat of the archdiocese, which was located on the north side of the Las Vegas Strip, could not accommodate the increasing number of resorts that were being built on the south end of the strip in the early 1990s, even after the cathedral's expansion. The diocese's bishop at the time, Daniel F. Walsh, chose an empty plot of land off Reno Avenue as the location for the church. The diocese already had $1.5 million in its construction fund at the time, and was able to raise another $2 million in a fundraising campaign. The 7 acres (2.8 ha) site cost $2.7 million, and the 26,000 sq ft (2,400 m^{2}) shrine itself cost $3.5 million. Both casino executives, such as Kirk Kerkorian and small donors, contributed to the funds for the construction of the church, which was started in 1992 by Marnell Corrao Associates. During construction, a temporary chapel was created at the Hacienda (now Mandalay Bay).

The shrine was dedicated on February 2, 1993, on the feast of the Presentation of Jesus. It originally sat 2,200 until renovations that replaced the pews reduced it to 2,000 in 2014. These renovations were funded by donations to the building fund and also allowed for the construction of a new roof, flooring, and updates to the cooling and sound system.

== Description ==
The shrine is surrounded by hotels; it is adjacent to the Luxor Las Vegas and Tropicana Las Vegas. The entrance of the church is flanked by three bronze statues of Jesus. A small chapel dedicated to Our Lady of Guadalupe that houses murals of Catholic figures commissioned by former bishop Daniel F. Walsh is located inside. The church also has a gift shop, which sells casino chips with the image of Jesus on them.
