= List of churches in the Archdiocese of Las Vegas =

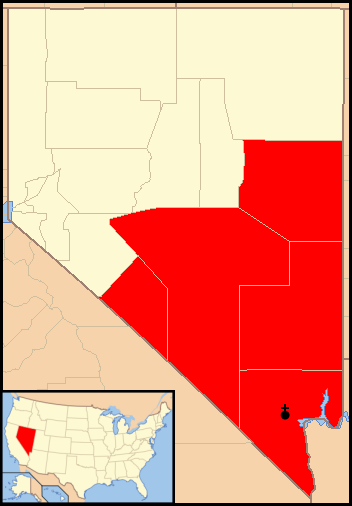
Archdiocese of Las Vegas in red

This is a list of current Roman Catholic parishes and mission churches in the Roman Catholic Archdiocese of Las Vegas in Southern and Eastern Nevada in the United States.

== Clark County ==
This list contains parishes in Las Vegas, Henderson and other communities in Southern Nevada.

| Name | Image | Location | Description/notes |
|---|---|---|---|
| Christ the King | | 4925 S Torrey Pines Dr, Las Vegas | |
| La Virgen de Guadalupe | | 401 Canyon Crest Blvd, Mesquite | Founded as mission in 1992, became a parish in 1999. Church consecrated in 2009 |
| Guardian Angel Cathedral | | 302 Cathedral Way, Las Vegas | Founded as a shrine in 1963, the first Catholic place of worship on the Las Vegas Strip. Designated as co-cathedral in 1977, now sole cathedral |
| Holy Family | | 4490 Mountain Vista St, Las Vegas | |
| Holy Spirit | | 5830 Mesa Park Dr, Las Vegas | Founded in 2007, church dedicated in 2018 |
| Our Lady of La Vang | | 4835 S. Pearl St, Las Vegas | Founded in 2011, dedicated as a shrine in 2013 |
| Our Lady of Las Vegas | | 3050 Alta Dr, Las Vegas | |
| Prince of Peace | | 5485 E Charleston Blvd, Las Vegas | |
| Shrine of the Most Holy Redeemer | | 55 E. Reno Ave, Las Vegas | Dedicated as a shrine in 1993 |
| St. Andrew | | 1399 San Felipe Dr, Boulder City | |
| St. Anne | | 1901 S. Maryland Pkwy, Las Vegas | Constructed in 1963 |
| St. Anthony of Padua | | 6350 N. Fort Apache Rd, Las Vegas | Founded in 2006, church dedicated in 2016 |
| St. Bridget | | 220 N. 14th St, Las Vegas | |
| St. Elizabeth Ann Seton | | 1811 Pueblo Vista Dr, Las Vegas | Founded in the 1980s |
| St. Francis of Assisi | | 2300 Sunridge Heights Pwky, Henderson | Parish founded in 2002 |
| St. Francis de Sales | | 1111 Michael Way, Las Vegas | |
| St. James the Apostle | | 1920 N. Martin Luther King Blvd, Las Vegas | Founded as mission in 1940, became parish in 1952 |
| St. Joan of Arc | | 315 S. Casino Center Blvd, Las Vegas | Oldest Catholic parish in Las Vegas. Mission founded in 1908, church dedicated in 1940 |
| St. Catherine of Siena Mission | | 47 Pearl Ave, Sandy Valley | |
| St. Christopher | | 1840 N. Bruce St, North Las Vegas | Founded in 1950 |
| St. John the Baptist Mission Church | | 3055 El Mirage Way, Laughlin | First mass in Nevada celebrated in Laughlin in 1776. Founded as mission in 1992, church dedicated in 2003 |
| St. John the Evangelist | | 2955 St. Joseph St, Logandale | Church started in 2006 |
| St. John Neumann | | 2575 W. El Campo Grande Ave, North Las Vegas | Church dedicated in 1999 |
| St. John Paul II Polish Apostolate | | 3050 Alta Dr, Las Vegas | Secondary mass center at St. Joan of Arc Church |
| St. Joseph, Husband of Mary | | 7260 W. Sahara Ave, Las Vegas | Founded in 1991, church dedicated in 1996 |
| St. Paul Jung-Ha-Sang Korean | | 6080 S. Jones Blvd, Las Vegas | |
| St. Peter the Apostle | | 204 S. Boulder Hwy, Henderson | Church dedicated in 1947 |
| St. Thomas Aquinas | | 4765 Brussels Ave, Las Vegas | Newman Center for the University of Nevada Las Vegas campus. |
| St. Thomas More | | 130 N, Pecos Rd, Henderson | Founded in 1983, church dedicated in 1996 |
| St. Viator | | 2461 E. Flamingo Rd, Las Vegas | Founded in 1954, church dedicated in 1995 |

== Lincoln County ==
| Name | Image | Location | Description/notes |
|---|---|---|---|
| Holy Child | | 80 Tennille St, Caliente | Founded in early 20th Century as mission of St. Joan of Arc Parish |

== Nye County ==
| Name | Image | Location | Description/notes |
|---|---|---|---|
| Our Lady of the Valley | | 781 E. Gamebird Rd, Pahrump | |
| Christ of the Desert Mission | | 1730 E. White Sands, Amargosa Valley | Supervised by Our Lady of the Valley Parish |
| St. Patrick | | 144 South St, Tonopah | Founded in 1901 |
| St. Barbara Mission Church | | 91 Hadley Cir, Round Mountain | Supervised by St. Patrick Parish |

== White Pine County ==
| Name | Image | Location | Description/notes |
|---|---|---|---|
| Sacred Heart | | 900 E. 11th St, Ely | Founded in 1907, church dedicated in 2006 |
| St. Michael Mission | | 50 Second St, McGill | Founded in 1910 |
