= Gregory Gordon (bishop) =

American prelate

His Excellency, The Most Reverend Gregory W. Gordon KC*HS
- Auxiliary Bishop of Las Vegas
- Archdiocese: Las Vegas
- Appointed: May 28, 2021
- Installed: July 16, 2021
- Other post: Titular Bishop of Nova Petra

Orders
- Ordination: January 16, 1988 by Daniel F. Walsh
- Consecration: July 16, 2021 by George Leo Thomas, Joseph A. Pepe, Daniel F. Walsh

Personal details
- Born: October 4, 1960 (age 66) Philadelphia, Pennsylvania, US
- Education: Saint Joseph's University (1978-1980); St. Charles Borromeo Seminary (1980-1983); Pontifical Gregorian University (1986); Pontifical Lateran University (1987)
- Motto: Domine dic verbo et sana (Lord say the word and heal)

Styles of Gregory William Gordon
- Reference style: His Excellency; The Most Reverend
- Spoken style: Your Excellency
- Religious style: Bishop

Ordination history of Gregory Gordon
History
Priestly ordination
- Ordained by: Daniel F. Walsh
Episcopal consecration
- Principal consecrator: George Leo Thomas
- Co-consecrators: Joseph A. Pepe; Daniel F. Walsh

Gregory William Gordon (born October 4, 1960) is an American prelate of the Roman Catholic Church who has been serving as the first auxiliary bishop for the Archdiocese of Las Vegas in Nevada since 2021.

== Biography ==
=== Early life and education ===
Gordon was born on October 4, 1960, in Philadelphia, Pennsylvania. In 1972, when he was age 11, the family moved to Boulder City, Nevada. In 1978, Gordon entered Saint Joseph's University in Philadelphia. He then moved to St. Charles Borromeo Seminary in Wynnewood, Pennsylvania, receiving a Bachelor of Arts in philosophy in 1983. While in Philadelphia, Gordon saw Pope John Paul II in his 1978 papal visit; it solidified his intentions to become a priest.

Gordon continued his studies in Rome, living at the North American College and entering the Pontifical Gregorian University. He was awarded a Bachelor of Sacred Theology degree in 1986. In 1987, he received a Licentiate of Sacred Theology from the Pontifical John Paul II Institute for Studies on Marriage and Family of the Pontifical Lateran University, located in Washington, D.C.

=== Priesthood ===
Gordon was ordained to the priesthood at Guardian Angels Cathedral in Las Vegas by Bishop Daniel F. Walsh on January 16, 1988, for the Diocese of Reno-Las Vegas.

After his ordination, the diocese assigned Gordon as parochial vicar at St. Francis de Sales Parish in Las Vegas. He was transferred in 1990 to a position as associate pastor and then administrator at St. Anne Parish in Las Vegas. In 1992, Gordon left St. Anne to serve in the campus ministry at the University of Nevada, Las Vegas while also assuming the role as pastor pro tempore at St. Mary the Virgin Parish in Las Vegas. In 1993, he was moved to Our Lady of Las Vegas Parish, where served as associate pastor. Gordon was relocated again in 1994 to become administrator and then pastoral administrator of St. Christopher Parish in North Las Vegas, Nevada, where he would remain for the next eight years.

On March 21, 1995, Gordon was incardinated into the new Diocese of Las Vegas when John Paul II separated it from the Diocese of Reno-Las Vegas. In 2004, Gordon was named pastor at St. Francis of Assisi Parish in Henderson, Nevada.

In 2007, Gordon moved to Washington, D.C., where he was assigned to the Apostolic Nunciature. He served as secretary to the apostolic nuncio, first Archbishop Pietro Sambi and later Archbishop Carlo Viganò. On May 21, 2009, Gordon was named a chaplain of his holiness by Pope Benedict XVI, which granted him the title of monsignor.

Gordon returned to Las Vegas in 2014, where he was appointed pastor at St. Anne Parish In 2020, Bishop George Leo Thomas named Gordon as chancellor, moderator of the curia, and vicar general for the diocese.

=== Auxiliary Bishop of Las Vegas ===
On May 28, 2021, Gordon was named as the first auxiliary bishop of Las Vegas and titular bishop of Nova Petra by Pope Francis. He received his episcopal consecration on July 16, 2021, at the Shrine of the Most Holy Redeemer in Las Vegas from Bishop George Leo Thomas, with Bishops Joseph A. Pepe and Daniel F. Walsh serving as co-consecrators.

In August 2021, Gordon stated that the diocese would not issue religious exemptions to parishioners to avoid taking the COVID-19 vaccine. As of 2024, Gordon continued to serve as vicar general and moderator of the curia.

== See also ==
- Catholic Church hierarchy
- Catholic Church in the United States
- Historical list of the Catholic bishops of the United States
- List of Catholic bishops of the United States
- Lists of patriarchs, archbishops, and bishops

== Episcopal succession ==
Catholic Church titles
Preceded by -	Auxiliary Bishop of Las Vegas; 2021-Present	Succeeded by -
