= Gregory Gordon =

Gregory Gordon may refer to:

- Gregory Gordon (lawyer), American scholar of international law
- Gregory Gordon (bishop) (born 1960), American Roman Catholic bishop
