= Kolbe Academy =

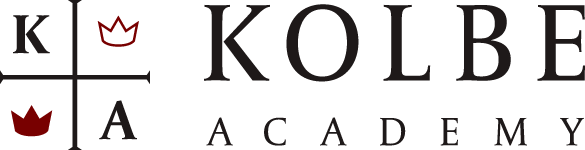

Location
- 1600 F Street; Napa, California 94559; United States

Information
- Type: Homeschool, online academy
- Motto: Ad Majorem Dei Gloriam (For the Greater Glory of God)
- Religious affiliation: Roman Catholic
- Established: 1983
- Head of school: Megan Lengyel
- Staff: 54
- Teaching staff: 79
- Grades: K–12
- Colors: Red and white
- Slogan: Catholic Classical Customizable
- Accreditation: National Association of Private Catholic and Independent Schools (NAPCIS)
- Website: www.kolbe.org

Kolbe Academy is a homeschool provider and online academy based in Napa, California, United States.

== Background ==
Kolbe Academy Homeschool was founded in 1983. It provides homeschooling curriculum and materials, record keeping and educational advice from its offices in Napa, California. Since 2013, it has offered online courses to high school and junior high students, and since 2020 has offered online courses to elementary students. Although it originally grew out of a private day school in Napa, Kolbe Academy is its own entity, and exists independently of that institution.

== Pedagogy ==
Kolbe Academy adheres to the Ignatian method of learning, centered around a curriculum that is classically based. Kolbe is known for its great books approach to learning, which requires students to maintain a rigorous reading schedule.

== Accreditation ==
Kolbe Academy is accredited by the National Association of Private Catholic and Independent Schools (NAPCIS).
