= Robert Francis Hennessey =

American prelate of the Catholic Church (born 1952)

His Excellency, The Most Reverend Robert Francis Hennessey
- Auxiliary Bishop of Boston; Titular Bishop of Tigias
- Church: Catholic Church; Latin Church
- Archdiocese: Boston
- Appointed: October 12, 2006
- Installed: December 12, 2006

Orders
- Ordination: May 20, 1978 by Humberto Sousa Medeiros
- Consecration: December 12, 2006 by Seán Patrick O'Malley, John Patrick Boles, and Emilio S. Allué

Personal details
- Born: April 20, 1952 (age 74) South Boston, Massachusetts
- Education: Saint John's Seminary (Massachusetts); University of Notre Dame
- Motto: Magnificat anima mea Dominum (Latin for 'My soul magnifies the Lord')

Styles of Robert Francis Hennessey
- Reference style: His Excellency; The Most Reverend
- Spoken style: Your Excellency
- Religious style: Bishop

Robert Francis Hennessey (born April 20, 1952) is an American Catholic prelate who has served as an auxiliary bishop of the Archdiocese of Boston in Massachusetts since 2006.

== Biography ==
Robert Hennessey was born on April 20, 1952, in South Boston, Massachusetts, to John and Eileen (née Cahill) Hennessey. His father was an officer with the Boston Police Department. The second of five children, Robert Hennessey has two brothers, John and Daniel, and two sisters, Deborah and Barbara.

Robert Hennessey attended St. Augustine Grammar School in South Boston, then was accepted for seventh grade at Boston Latin School. Having decided to become a priest, Hennessey spent the next eight years at St. John's Seminary in Boston. He was ordained a deacon in 1977.

=== Priesthood ===
Hennessey was ordained to the priesthood by Cardinal Humberto Medeiros at the Cathedral of the Holy Cross in Boston on May 20, 1978 for the Archdiocese of Boston.

After his ordination, the archdiocese assigned Hennessey as parochial vicar at St. Joseph Parish in Hanson, Massachusetts. Hennessey's next assignment was as parochial vicar at St. Peter Parish in Plymouth, Massachusetts. In 1983, he was assigned to St. Joseph Parish in Needham, Massachusetts, staying there for three years. Hennessey then entered a graduate studies program at the Moreau Seminary at the University of Notre Dame in Notre Dame, Indiana.

After finishing at Notre Dame, Hennessey spent the next six years serving in the Missionary Society of St. James the Apostle in a Bolivian parish with a Catholic population of 45,000. Following his return to Boston in 1994, the archdiocese named Hennessey as administrator of Most Holy Redeemer Parish in East Boston, Massachusetts, a largely Hispanic parish, where he served for the next 12 years. In 1995, he also became the administrator of the Our Lady of the Airways Chapel at Logan International Airport in Boston, serving there until 1998.

=== Auxiliary Bishop of Boston ===
On October 12, 2006, Pope Benedict XVI appointed Hennessey as an auxiliary bishop of Boston and titular bishop of Tigias. He received his episcopal consecration on December 12, 2006, from Archbishop Seán O'Malley at the Cathedral of the Holy Cross, with Bishops John Boles and Emilio Allué serving as co-consecrators. Hennessey's episcopal motto is "Magnificat Anima Mea Dominum" Luke 1:46-55, meaning, "My soul magnifies the Lord".

In January 2009, Hennessey addressed a group of parish members in the Dorchester neighborhood of Boston. He warned them that a decline in mass attendance in their churches and the shortage of priests in the archdiocese could result in the merging their parishes.

Hennessey first held the post of episcopal vicar for the Central Pastoral Region of the archdiocese, but was transferred in January 2014 to the Merrimack Region. In December 2014, the outdoor nativity scene at Sacred Heart Church in Haverhill, Massachusetts, was vandalized; someone stole the baby Jesus figure and replaced it with the head of a pig. Hennessey later blessed the restored nativity scene and expressed his hope that the vandals seek counseling.

In the United States Conference of Catholic Bishops, Hennessey has served as a member of the Subcommittee on the Catholic Campaign for Human Development. As of 2025, Hennessey is the vicar general regional bishop for the Merrimack Region.

== See also ==
- Catholic Church hierarchy
- Catholic Church in the United States
- Historical list of the Catholic bishops of the United States
- List of Catholic bishops of the United States
- Lists of patriarchs, archbishops, and bishops
