= Mark Joseph Hurley =

American prelate (1919–2001)

His Excellency, The Most Reverend Mark Joseph Hurley
- Bishop of Santa Rosa in California
- See: Santa Rosa
- Installed: November 19, 1969
- Term ended: April 15, 1986
- Predecessor: Leo Thomas Maher
- Successor: John Thomas Steinbock
- Previous post: Auxiliary Bishop of San Francisco (1968 to 1969)

Orders
- Ordination: September 23, 1944 by John Joseph Mitty
- Consecration: January 4, 1968 by Joseph Thomas McGucken

Personal details
- Born: December 13, 1919 San Francisco, California, US
- Died: February 5, 2001 (aged 81) San Francisco
- Denomination: Roman Catholic Church

Mark Joseph Hurley (December 13, 1919 – February 5, 2001) was an American prelate of the Roman Catholic Church. He served as bishop of Santa Rosa in California from 1969 to 1986. He previously served as an auxiliary bishop of the Archdiocese of San Francisco in California from 1968 to 1969.

== Early life and education ==
Mark Hurley was born on December 13, 1919, in San Francisco, California, one of five children of Mark Joseph and Josephine (née Keohane) Hurley. One of his brothers, Francis Thomas Hurley, served as archbishop of Anchorage (1976–2001).

Mark Hurley received his early education at the parochial school of St. Agnes Parish in San Francisco. He began his studies for the priesthood at St. Joseph's College in Mountain View, California, graduating in 1939. He then completed his theological studies at St. Patrick's Seminary in Menlo Park, California.

== Priesthood ==
Hurley was ordained a priest for the Archdiocese of San Francisco on September 23, 1944, by Archbishop John Joseph Mitty in San Francisco. After his ordination, the archdiocese assigned Hurley to the faculty of Serra High School in San Mateo, California. He was also named assistant superintendent of the archdiocesan schools.During this period, he went to Washington D.C. to study at the Catholic University of America. He received a Doctor of Philosophy degree in 1947.

The archdiocese in 1951 assigned Hurley to serve as the founding principal of Bishop O'Dowd High School in Oakland, California. He was transferred in 1959 to be principal of Marin Catholic High School in Kentfield, California. He also served as assistant coordinator of the archdiocesan campaign of Taxation of Schools in California.

In 1962, Hurley was named a domestic prelate by Pope John XXIII. The diocese that same year named him as superintendent of schools in the Diocese of Stockton. He earned a Bachelor of Canon Law degree from the Pontifical Lateran University in Rome in 1963. From 1962 to 1965, Hurley was a peritus, or theological expert, at the Second Vatican Council in Rome, acting as an advisor to the commission on seminaries, universities, and schools. Following his return to San Francisco, he served as assistant chancellor from 1965 to 1969. For several years, he appeared on a San Francisco television program, Problems Please.

Other Assignments

- Administrator, St. Eugene Parish, Santa Rosa, California, 1959
- Syndicated columnist, San Francisco, The Monitor, Sacramento Herald, Oakland Voice, Yakima Our Times, Guam Diocesan Press, 1949–1966
- Faith of Our Father weekly TV program speaker, 1956–1958, San Francisco
- Pastor, St. Francis of Assisi Parish, San Francisco, 1967
- Vicar general 1968
- Chair, Citizens' Committee for San Francisco State College, December 12, 1968.

== Auxiliary Bishop of San Francisco ==
On November 21, 1967, Hurley was appointed as an auxiliary bishop of San Francisco and titular bishop of Thunusuda by Pope Paul VI. He received his episcopal consecration at Saint Ignace Church in San Francisco on January 4, 1968, from Archbishop Joseph Thomas McGucken, with Bishops Hugh Aloysius Donohoe and Ernest John Primeau serving as co-consecrators. His consecration was one of the first such liturgies to be celebrated in the vernacular. As an auxiliary bishop, he continued to serve as assistant chancellor of the archdiocese.

== Bishop of Santa Rosa in California ==
Hurley was named the second bishop of Santa Rosa in California by Paul VI on November 19, 1969. Hurley was installed as bishop at St. Eugene Cathedral in Santa Rosa, California, on January 14, 1970. During his tenure, he implemented the reforms of the Second Vatican Council and worked to ensure the financial stability of the diocese.

Hurley established terms of office for pastors and associate pastors, opened a low-income senior residence, and created the Priests' Retirement Fund, Project Hope, and the Apostolic Endowment Fund. He founded the Centro Pastoral Hispano and re-dedicated the Blessed Kateri Tekakwitha Mission in Hoopa, California. He established two new parishes in his last five years as bishop, and ordained over a dozen priests and deacons in his last three years.

== Later life and death ==
After governing the diocese for sixteen years, Hurley resigned as bishop of Santa Rosa in California on April 15, 1986. He died on February 5, 2001 after an operation for an aneurysm in San Francisco, at age 81.

== Memberships ==
- Delegate, Conference on Psychiatry and Religion, San Francisco, 1957
- Board member, State of California Committee for the Study of Education, 1955–1960
- Delegate to NCEA Education Conference of German and American Educators, Munich, Germany, 1960
- Delegate-at-large, State of California, White House Conference on Youth, Washington, D.C., 1960
- Member of Commission on Seminaries, Universities, and Schools, Second Vatican Council, 1962–1963
- Catholic delegate and observer, National Council of Churches (Protestant), Columbus, Ohio, 1964
- Member, US bishops' press panel, Second Vatican Council, Rome, 1964–1965
- Member, US bishops' Committee on the Laity, Rome, 1964
- Member, US bishops' Committee on the Laity, Rome, Jewish Relations, 1964 to 1970
- Member of NCEA delegation for study of education in Peru, 1965
- Member, Liaison Committee of National Conference of Catholic Bishops (USA) with Priests' Senates
- Member, Commission on Christian Formation, United States Catholic Conference of Bishops, 1968
- Member, Education Committee of the Bishops of California, 1969

== Publications ==
- Church State Relationships in Education in California, 1948, Washington, DC
- Commentary on Declaration on Christian Education of Vatican II, 1966, Paulist Press, Glenn Rock, NJ
- Report on Education in Peru, NCEA, Washington, DC, 1965
- Informe Sobre La Educacion en Peru, Asoceacion Catholica de Educacion National, Washington, DC, 1965
- Knight Commander of the Order of the Holy Sepulchre, June 1969

Catholic Church titles
Preceded by Leo Thomas Maher	Bishop of Santa Rosa in California; 1969–1986	Succeeded by John Thomas Steinbock
