= José de Jesús Madera Uribe =

American Roman Catholic priest and bishop

His Eminence, The Most Reverend José de Jesús Madera Uribe MSpS
- Bishop of the Military Services, USA
- Church: Roman Catholic Church
- See: Diocese for the Military Services, USA
- In office: May 28, 1991 to September 14, 2004
- Other posts: Bishop of Fresno; 1980 to 1991; Coadjutor Bishop of Fresno; 1979 to 1980

Orders
- Ordination: June 15, 1957
- Consecration: March 4, 1980 by Roger Mahony

Personal details
- Born: November 27, 1927 San Francisco, California, US
- Died: January 21, 2017 (aged 89) Culver City, California, US
- Motto: To Jesus through Mary

Styles of José de Jesús Madera Uribe
- Reference style: His Excellency; The Most Reverend
- Spoken style: Your Excellency
- Religious style: Bishop

José de Jesús Madera Uribe MSpS (November 27, 1927 – January 21, 2017) was an American Catholic prelate who served as an auxiliary bishop for the Archdiocese for the Military Services in Washington, D.C. from 1991 to 2004. He previously served as bishop of Fresno in California from 1980 to 1991. He was a member of the Missionaries of the Holy Spirit.

== Biography ==
=== Early life ===
José de Jesús Madera Uribe was born in San Francisco, California on November 27, 1927, to Jesus Madera Flores and Paz Uribe Santana. He was raised in El Grullo, Jalisco, Mexico with his seven siblings. Deciding to study for the priesthood, Madera Uribe entered the Missionaries of the Holy Spirit, professing his vows on March 10, 1948.

=== Priesthood ===
Madera Uribe was ordained a priest at the Holy Spirit Missionaries House of Studies in Mexico City for the Missionaries on June 15, 1957. For the next 15 years, the Missionaries assigned Madera Uribe as a parish priest in the Archdiocese of Los Angeles.

=== Coadjutor Bishop and Bishop of Fresno ===
On December 18, 1979, Pope John Paul II appointed Madera Uribe as coadjutor bishop of Fresno; he was consecrated bishop in Fresno, California, on March 4, 1980, by Cardinal Roger Mahony. Madera Uribe succeeded as bishop of the diocese on June 1, 1980.

=== Auxiliary Bishop of the Archdiocese for the Military Services, USA ===
On May 28, 1991, John Paul II appointed Madera Uribe as an auxiliary bishop of the Military Services, USA.

John Paul II accepted Madera Uribe's retirement as auxiliary bishop of the Military Services on September 14, 2004. José Madera Uribe died in Culver City, California, on January 21, 2017.

== See also ==
- Catholic Church hierarchy
- Catholic Church in the United States
- Historical list of the Catholic bishops of the United States
- Insignia of chaplain schools in the United States military
- List of Catholic bishops of the United States
- List of Catholic bishops of the United States: military service
- Lists of patriarchs, archbishops, and bishops
- Military chaplain
- Religious symbolism in the United States military
- United States military chaplains

== Episcopal succession ==
Catholic Church titles
Preceded by –	Auxiliary Bishop for the Military Services, USA; 1991 – 2004	Succeeded by –
Preceded by Hugh Aloysius Donohoe	Bishop of Fresno; 1980–1991	Succeeded by John Thomas Steinbock
