= John Thomas Steinbock =

American prelate

His Eminence, The Most Reverend John Thomas Steinbock
- Bishop of Fresno; Titular Bishop of Midila
- Church: Roman Catholic Church
- See: Diocese of Fresno
- Predecessor: José de Jesús Madera Uribe
- Successor: Armando Xavier Ochoa
- Previous posts: Bishop of Santa Rosa (1987 to 1991); Auxiliary Bishop of Orange (1984 to 1987); Titular Bishop of Midila

Orders
- Ordination: May 1, 1963 by James McIntyre
- Consecration: July 14, 1984 by Timothy Manning

Personal details
- Born: July 16, 1937 Los Angeles, California, US
- Died: December 10, 2010 (aged 73) Fresno, California, US
- Motto: All for the love of God

Styles of John Thomas Steinbock
- Reference style: The Most Reverend
- Spoken style: Your Excellency
- Religious style: Monsignor

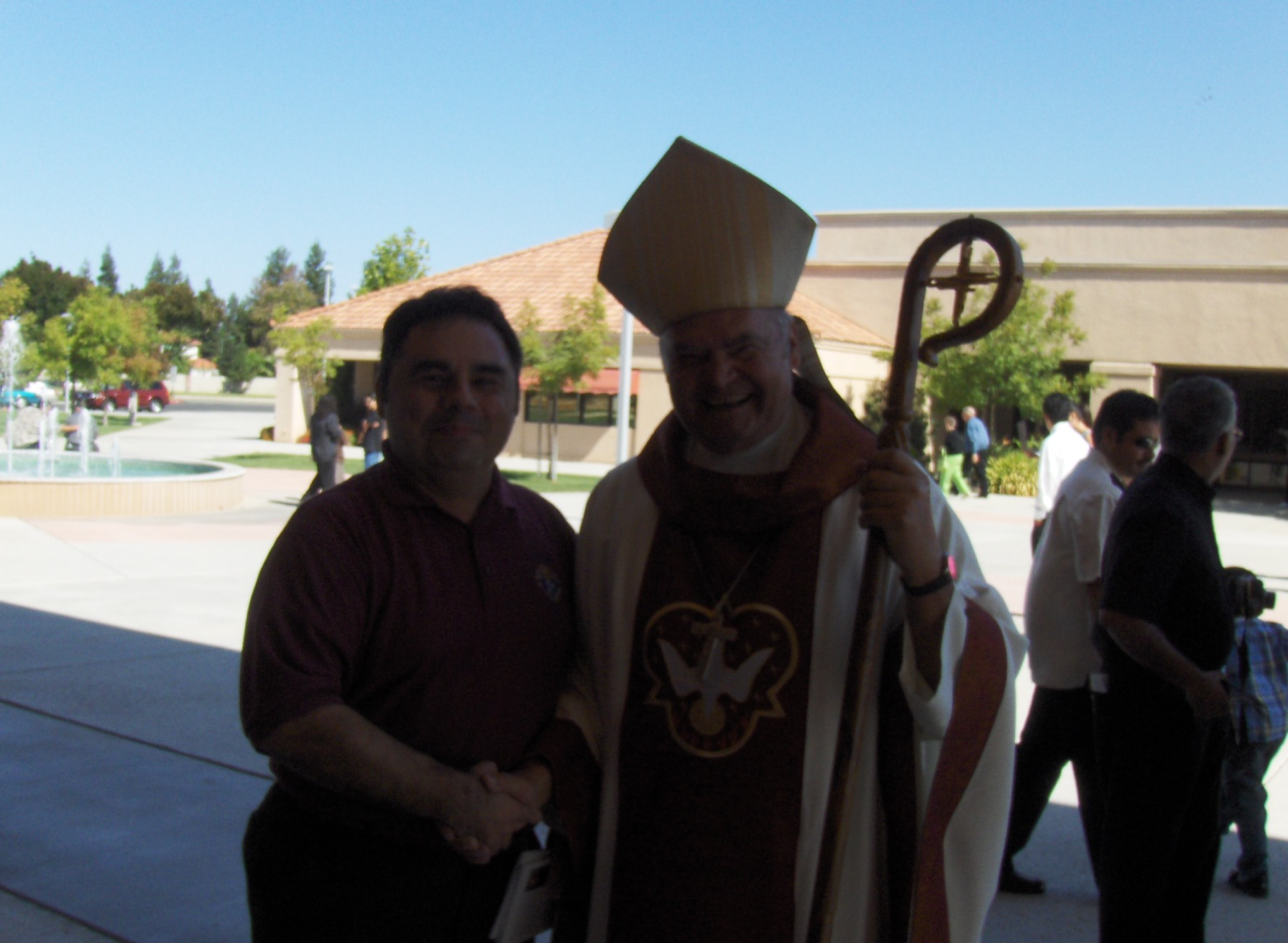
Bishop Steinbock greets a fellow Knight of Columbus (2007)

John Thomas Steinbock (July 16, 1937 – December 5, 2010) was an American prelate of the Roman Catholic Church. He served as the fourth bishop of the Diocese of Fresno in California from 1991 until his death in 2010.

Steinbock previously served as an auxiliary bishop of the Diocese of Orange in California from 1984 to 1987 and as bishop of the Diocese of Santa Rosa in California from 1987 to 1991.

== Biography ==
=== Early life ===
Steinbock was born on July 16, 1937, in Los Angeles, California. He was ordained to the priesthood for the Archdiocese of Los Angeles by Cardinal James McIntyre on May 1, 1963. He then served as associate pastor in two parishes in East Los Angeles. In 1972, he was appointed administrator of Santa Isabel Parish in East Los Angeles. Steinbock later became associate pastor (1973) and parochial vicar (1981) of St. Vibiana's Cathedral.

He served as president of the Los Angeles Priests' Council from 1979 to 1980, as well as a member of the Board of Consultors of the archdiocese from 1979 to 1982.

=== Auxiliary Bishop of Orange ===
On May 29, 1984, Steinbock was appointed auxiliary bishop of Orange and titular bishop of Midila by Pope John Paul II. He received his episcopal consecration at St. Columba Church in Garden Grove, California, on July 14, 1984, from Cardinal Timothy Manning, with Bishops William Johnson and Manuel Moreno serving as co-consecrators. Steinbock chose as his personal motto "All for the love of God." Steinbock was appointed vicar general of the diocese in July 1984, and diocesan administrator in 1986.

=== Bishop of Santa Rosa ===
John Paul II named Steinbock as the third bishop of Santa Rosa on January 27, 1987.

=== Bishop of Fresno ===
John Paul II appointed Steinbock as the fourth bishop of Fresno on October 15, 1991. In 2003, Steinbock published Ministry of Presence, a book of 100 vignettes from his 21 years ministering to the poor, immigrants and gang members in East Los Angeles, California and on skid row. He wrote:

"One may not be able to respond to the many problems in people's lives, but one can be with them in their sufferings and joys. And the priest is with the people, so that they understand that the Lord Jesus is with them, loving them, suffering with them."

=== Retirement and legacy ===
Steinbock died on December 5, 2010, in Fresno at age 73.He had been diagnosed with cancer in August and had been hospitalized at St. Agnes Medical Center in Fresno due to blood clots for about a month before his death.

== Episcopal succession ==
Catholic Church titles
Preceded by Mark Joseph Hurley	Bishop of Santa Rosa; 1987–1991	Succeeded by George Patrick Ziemann
Preceded by José de Jesús Madera Uribe, MSpS	Bishop of Fresno; 1991–2010	Succeeded by Armando Xavier Ochoa
