= Joseph A. Pepe =

American Roman Catholic prelate

His Excellency, The Most Reverend Joseph Anthony Pepe
- Bishop Emeritus of Las Vegas
- Archdiocese: San Francisco
- Diocese: Las Vegas
- Appointed: April 6, 2001
- Installed: May 31, 2001
- Retired: February 28, 2018
- Predecessor: Daniel Francis Walsh
- Successor: George Leo Thomas

Orders
- Ordination: May 16, 1970 by John Cardinal Krol
- Consecration: May 31, 2001 by William Levada; Michael Sheehan; Joseph Anthony Galante

Personal details
- Born: June 18, 1942 (age 84) Philadelphia, Pennsylvania
- Parents: Francis and Elvira (née Fazio) Pepe
- Education: St. Charles Borromeo Seminary; Pontifical University of Saint Thomas Aquinas
- Motto: As one who serves

Styles of Joseph Anthony Pepe
- Reference style: His Excellency; The Most Reverend
- Spoken style: Your Excellency
- Religious style: Bishop

Joseph Anthony Pepe (born June 18, 1942) is an American prelate of the Roman Catholic Church. He served as the second bishop of the Diocese of Las Vegas in Nevada from 2001 to 2018.

== Biography ==
=== Early life ===
Joseph Pepe was born on June 18, 1942, in Philadelphia, Pennsylvania, one of the two children of Francis and Elvira (née Fazio) Pepe. He was baptized at St. Francis de Sales Church in Philadelphia. After his graduation from Roman Catholic High School in Philadelphia in 1960, Pepe entered St. Charles Borromeo Seminary in Wynnewood, Pennsylvania.

=== Priesthood ===
On May 16, 1970, Pepe was ordained to the priesthood for the Archdiocese of Philadelphia by Cardinal John Krol at Saints Peter and Paul Cathedral in Philadelphia.

Pepe then served as an assistant pastor at Our Lady of Loreta Parish in Philadelphia while also teaching at Cardinal O'Hara High School in Springfield, Pennsylvania. In 1976, he obtained his Doctor of Canon Law degree from the Pontifical University of Saint Thomas Aquinas in Rome. He was also named defender of the bond for the Metropolitan Tribunal that same year, and prosynodal judge in 1977.

From 1982 to 1987, Pepe served as professor of canon law at St. Charles Borromeo Seminary. He was also appointed vice-chancellor (1987) and chancellor (1990) of the archdiocese; during his tenure in the chancery, he served as vice-promoter for the cause of beatification of Katharine Drexel.

Pepe was raised by the Vatican to the rank of honorary prelate in May 1991, and then served briefly as pastor of St. Justin Martyr Parish in Narberth, Pennsylvania. Upon the special request of Archbishop Michael Sheehan, Pepe was sent to the Archdiocese of Santa Fe in New Mexico in 1993 to serve as judicial vicar. In April 1998, he became chancellor, moderator of the curia, and vicar for priests of the archdiocese.

=== Bishop of Las Vegas ===
On April 6, 2001, Pope John Paul II appointed Pepe as the second bishop of the Diocese of Las Vegas. He was consecrated on May 31 by Cardinal William Levada at Guardian Angel Cathedral in Las Vegas, with Archbishop Sheehan and Bishop Joseph Galante serving as co-consecrators.

On October 18, 2003, Pepe dedicated the Our Lady of LaVang Vietnamese Catholic Community in Las Vegas as a shrine. In 2004, he opened a diocese human resources department along with an Office of Hispanic Ministry, an Office of Liturgy and Worship and an Office of Archives. On September 27, 2007, Pepe dedicated Bishop Gorman High School in Las Vegas.

On November 2, 2007, a priest appointed by Pepe to Our Lady of Las Vegas Catholic Parish was sentenced to four to 12 years in state prison for assault. Reverend George Chaanine had assaulted and groped Michaelina Bellamy, the events coordinator at the church, then evaded arrest for six months. Bellamy's injuries from the assault included a broken hand and two large gashes in her head. Chaanine later claimed to be in love with Bellamy and investigators found evidence that he provided her with financial support.

Pepe served on the boards of trustees of the Catholic University of America in Washington, D.C., the International Dominican Foundation, the Vatican Library in Rome and the Catholic Legal Immigration Network,

On February 28, 2018, Pope Francis accepted Pepe's letter of resignation as bishop of the Diocese of Las Vegas after he reached the mandatory retirement age of 75.

== See also ==
- Catholic Church hierarchy
- Catholic Church in the United States
- Historical list of the Catholic bishops of the United States
- List of Catholic bishops of the United States
- Lists of patriarchs, archbishops, and bishops

== Episcopal succession ==
Catholic Church titles
Preceded by Daniel Francis Walsh	Bishop of Las Vegas; 2001–2018	Succeeded by George Leo Thomas
