= Diocese of Santa Rosa in California =

Latin Catholic diocese in California, US

Coordinates: 38°26′55″N 122°42′17″W

Diocese of Santa Rosa in California Diœcesis Sanctae Rosae in California Diócesis de Santa Rosa en California
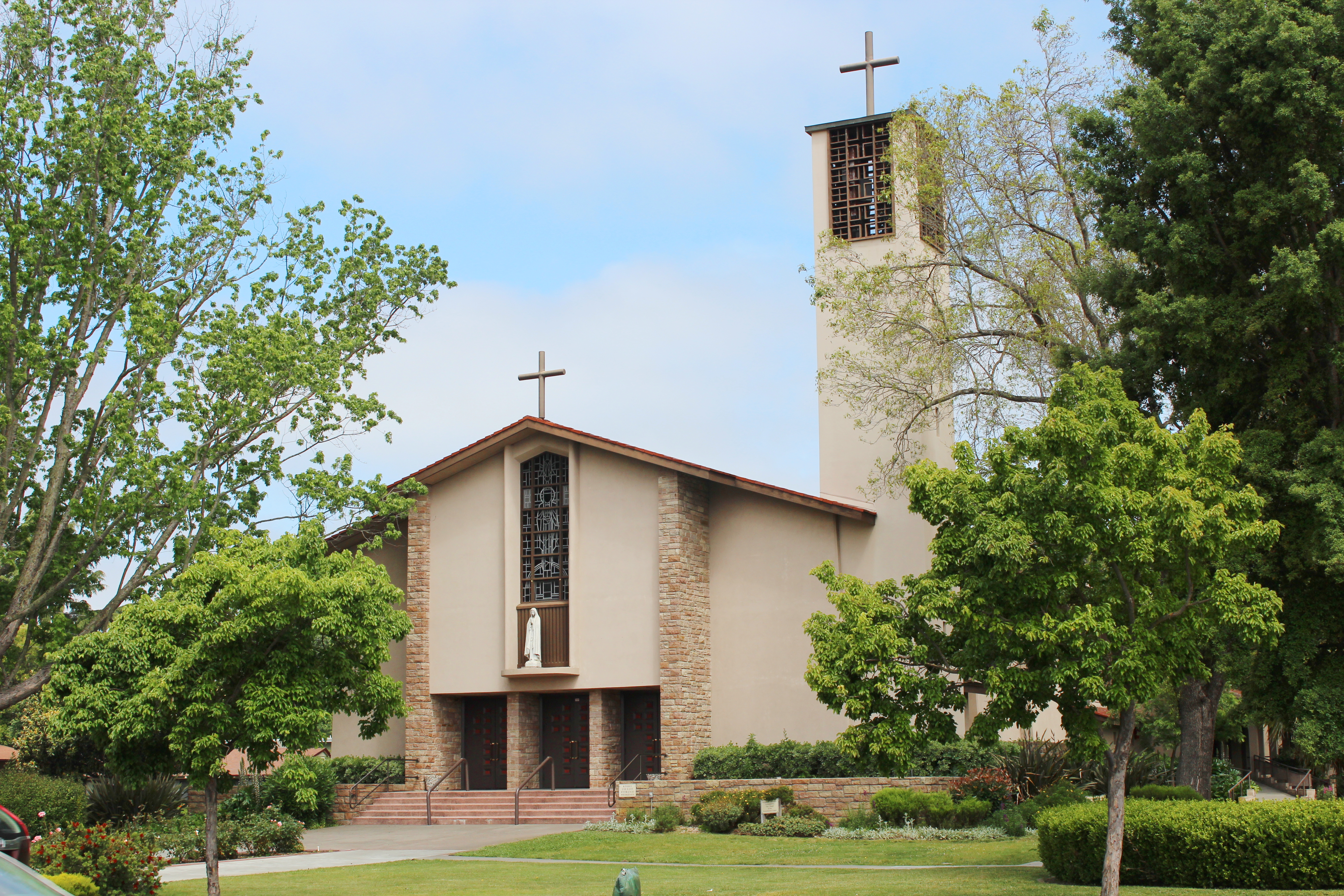
- Cathedral of St. Eugene

- Coat of arms

Location
- Country: United States
- Territory: Counties of Del Norte, Humboldt, Lake, Mendocino, Napa and Sonoma, California
- Ecclesiastical province: San Francisco

Statistics
- Area: 30,331.35 km^{2} (11,711.00 sq mi)
- Population: Total; Catholics: (as of 2023); 955,245; 191,049 (20%)
- Parishes: 40
- Schools: 15

Information
- Denomination: Catholic
- Sui iuris church: Latin Church
- Rite: Roman Rite
- Established: January 13, 1962
- Cathedral: Cathedral of Saint Eugene
- Patron saint: St. Rose of Lima
- Secular priests: 54

Current leadership
- Pope: Leo XIV
- Bishop: Robert Francis Vasa
- Metropolitan Archbishop: Salvatore Cordileone
- Bishops emeritus: Daniel Francis Walsh

Map
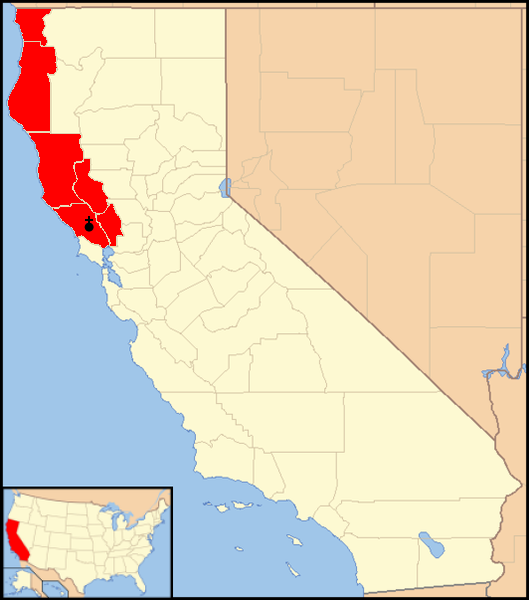

Website
- srdiocese.org

The Diocese of Santa Rosa in California (Latin: Diœcesis Sanctae Rosae in California) is a diocese of the Catholic Church in the northern California region of the United States. It is a suffragan diocese of the Archdiocese of San Francisco. The mother church is the Cathedral of Saint Eugene in Santa Rosa. The bishop is Robert Vasa.

== Territory ==
The Diocese of Santa Rosa in California comprises Del Norte, Humboldt, Lake, Mendocino, Napa and Sonoma Counties, all along the North Coast of California

== History ==
=== 1700 to 1840 ===
During the 18th century, all of California was a Spanish colony, part of the province of Las Californias in the Spanish Viceroyalty of New Spain. In 1804, the Spanish split Las Californias into two provinces:

- Alta California (Upper California) This included the modern American states of California, Nevada, Arizona, and Utah, along with western Colorado and southwestern Wyoming.
- Baja California Territory (Lower California). This consisted of the modern Mexican states of Baja California and Baja California Sur.

After the Mexican War of Independence ended in 1821, Spain ceded Alta California and Baja California to the new nation of Mexico. The first Catholic presence in the area was the establishment of the Mission San Francisco Solano in present-day Sonoma in 1823 by Jose Altamira.

In 1828, a Native American woman was listening to Juan Amoros preaching to a group by a creek near present-day Santa Rosa, now part of Mexico. She stepped forward and asked to be baptized a Christian. Since it was the feast day of Rose of Lima, Amoros baptized her as Rosa and named the creek and its surrounding area as Santa Rosa. The Asistencia Santa Rosa de Lima was established there.

The Mexican Government in 1833 announced plans to secularize all the missions in its territory, confiscating most of their vast land holdings. In response, the Mission San Francisco Solano in 1834 converted into a parish, with the missionaries being replaced by Mexican clergy.

=== 1840 to 1850 ===
In 1840, Pope Gregory XVI set up the Diocese of California. The new diocese included both Alta California and Baja California. Gregory XVI set the episcopal see at San Diego in Alta California. The first bishop of the new diocese was Francisco Garcia Diego y Moreno. Moreno designated the Mission Santa Barbara in Santa Barbara as his pro-cathedral.

In 1848, Mexico ceded Alta California to the United States at the close of the Mexican–American War. The government of Mexico then complained to the Vatican about San Diego, now an American city, having jurisdiction over the Mexican parishes in Baja California. In response, the Vatican in 1849 divided the Diocese of California:

- Baja California became a Mexican jurisdiction
- Alta California became the Diocese of Monterey. The Vatican moved the see city from San Diego to Monterey because it was more centrally located. The Royal Presidio Chapel in Monterey became the cathedral of the new American diocese.

=== 1850 to 1900 ===
The Vatican in 1853 erected the Archdiocese of San Francisco, including the entire North Coast region.Over the following decades, parishes were established in these communities:

- St. Vincent in Petaluma (1857)
- St. Bernard in Eureka (1858), the first parish in Humboldt and Del Norte Counties
- St. John the Baptist in Napa (1859), the first parish in Napa County
- St. Teresa of Avila in Bodega (1861)
- St. Anthony in Mendocino (1864), the first parish in Mendocino County
- St. Helena in St. Helena (1865)
- St. Joseph in Crescent City (1869)
- St. Peter in Kelseyville (1870)
- St. Mary in Lakeport (1871)

=== 1900 to 1987 ===
The Sisters of St. Joseph of Orange in 1912 travelled from Missouri to Eureka to start a school. During the Spanish Influenza epidemic in 1918, they traveled all over the community helping the sick. Community leaders then asked them to open a hospital in the town. The religious sisters established St. Joseph Hospital in 1920. It is today Providence St. Joseph Hospital Eureka. St. Patrick's was established as a mission church in Loleta in 1925.

In 1950, the Sisters of St. Joseph of Orange collaborated with local civic leaders to open Memorial Hospital in Santa Rosa. It is today Providence Santa Rosa Memorial Hospital. The same order in 1958 established Queen of the Valley Hospital in Napa. It is today Providence Queen of the Valley Medical Center.

Pope John XXIII erected the Diocese of Santa Rosa in California on February 21, 1962, with territory from the Archdiocese of San Francisco and the Diocese of Sacramento. He named Leo Maher of San Francisco as the first bishop of the new diocese.During his seven-year tenure as bishop, Maher established seven parishes, one mission, three high schools, four elementary schools, and several rectories and convents. He also elevated three missions to parish status and oversaw major renovations of four existing parish churches. Maher became bishop of the Diocese of San Diego in 1969.

Auxiliary Bishop Mark Hurley from San Francisco was the second bishop of Santa Rosa, named by Pope Paul VI in 1969. Hurley established terms of office for pastors and associate pastors, opened a low-income senior residence, and created the Priests' Retirement Fund, Project Hope, and the Apostolic Endowment Fund. He founded the Centro Pastoral Hispano and re-dedicated Blessed Kateri Tekakwitha Mission. Hurley established two new parishes in his last five years as bishop, and ordained over a dozen priests and deacons in his last three years. Hurley retired in 1986.

=== 1987 to present ===
Pope John Paul II named Auxiliary Bishop John Steinbock from the Diocese of Orange as the third bishop of Santa Rosa in 1987. Bishop Steinbock suspended youth minister Donald Kimball in 1990 after Kimball admitted to having sex with six minors. His actions became public when a 1997 lawsuit was filed against the diocese by four victims. He was laicized in 2000.

Steinbock became bishop of Fresno in 1991. To replace Steinbock, John Paul II appointed Auxiliary Bishop George Ziemann of Los Angeles. In 1996, priest Gary Timmons, who had been transferred since the 1960s whenever there were abuse reports, was convicted on charges of committing lewd or lascivious acts with minors and sentenced to four years in prison. Ziemann submitted his resignation as bishop of Santa Rosa to the Vatican in 1999 after admitting a sexual relationship with a man and being sued by him. To replace Ziemann, John Paul II appointed Bishop Daniel F. Walsh of the Diocese of Las Vegas in 2000. In 2011, Bishop Robert F. Vasa from the Diocese of Baker was appointed as coadjutor bishop to assist Walsh. When Walsh retired later that year, Vasa succeed him as bishop.

A massive wildfire in October 2017 partially destroyed Cardinal Newman High School and severely damaged Saint Rose Elementary School, both in Santa Rosa. In 2019, Bishop Vasa published a list of 39 clergy connected with the diocese who had credible accusations of sexual abuse of minors. In July 2019, Oscar Diaz, pastor of Resurrection Parish in Santa Rosa, admitted to stealing $95,000 from the parish. Although he was not prosecuted, the diocese permanently suspended Diaz from ministry. In March 2023, after facing nearly 200 sex abuse lawsuits, the diocese filed for Chapter 11 bankruptcy.

The diocese in October 2025 put two properties for sale to bolster its finances in the wake of its bankruptcy declaration. The properties were mission churches that were not being used for Mass. As of 2026, Vasa is the current bishop of Santa Rosa.

== Bishops ==
=== Bishops of Santa Rosa in California ===
1. Leo Thomas Maher (1962–1969), appointed Bishop of San Diego
2. Mark Joseph Hurley (1969–1986)
3. John Thomas Steinbock (1987–1991), appointed Bishop of Fresno
4. George Patrick Ziemann (1992–1999)
5. Daniel Francis Walsh (2000–2011)
6. Robert Francis Vasa (2011–present)

=== Coadjutor bishop ===
Robert Francis Vasa (2010–2011)

== Deaneries ==
As of 2025, the Diocese of Santa Rosa includes 40 parishes and 22 mission churches served by 37 active diocesan priests and 12 religious priests.It is divided into five deaneries.

== Education ==
As of 2023, the Diocese of Santa Rosa has a student enrollment exceeding 3,000.

=== High schools ===
As of 2025, the Diocese of Santa Rosa has the following Catholic high schools:

- Cardinal Newman High School – Santa Rosa, independent private school
- Justin-Siena High School – Napa, operated by the LaSallian Brothers
- Kolbe-Trinity School – Napa, independent private school
- St. Bernard's Academy – Eureka, operated by the diocese
- St. Vincent de Paul College Prep – Petaluma

== Health care ==
As of 2025, the following Catholic hospitals are in the Diocese of Santa Rosa. They are all operated by Providence, a health care network:

- Queen of the Valley Medical Center – Napa
- Redwood Memorial Hospital – Fortuna
- Petaluma Valley Hospital – Petaluma
- Santa Rosa Memorial Hospital – Santa Rosa
- St. Joseph Hospital – Eureka
