= George Patrick Ziemann =

American bishop (1941–2009)

Styles of George Patrick Ziemann
- Reference style: The Most Reverend
- Spoken style: Your Excellency
- Religious style: Monsignor

George Patrick Ziemann (September 13, 1941 – October 22, 2009) was the third Roman Catholic bishop of the Roman Catholic Diocese of Santa Rosa in California.

Born in Pasadena, California, Ziemann was ordained a Roman Catholic priest for the Roman Catholic Archdiocese of Los Angeles on April 29, 1967. On December 23, 1986, Pope John Paul II appointed Ziemann auxiliary bishop of the Los Angeles Archdiocese and he was consecrated on February 23, 1987, by then Archbishop Roger Mahony. On July 14, 1992, Pope John Paul II appointed Ziemann bishop of the Santa Rosa Diocese. On July 22, 1999, Ziemann resigned due to sexual and financial improprieties. Bishop Ziemann died in October 2009.

== Resources ==
- Past Bishops of the Diocese of Santa Rosa Retrieved: 2010-03-17

== Episcopal succession ==
Catholic Church titles
Preceded by John Steinbock	Bishop of Santa Rosa; 1992–1999	Succeeded by Daniel F. Walsh
