= Cathedral of Saint Eugene =

Catholic cathedral in California, US

Cathedral of St. Eugene
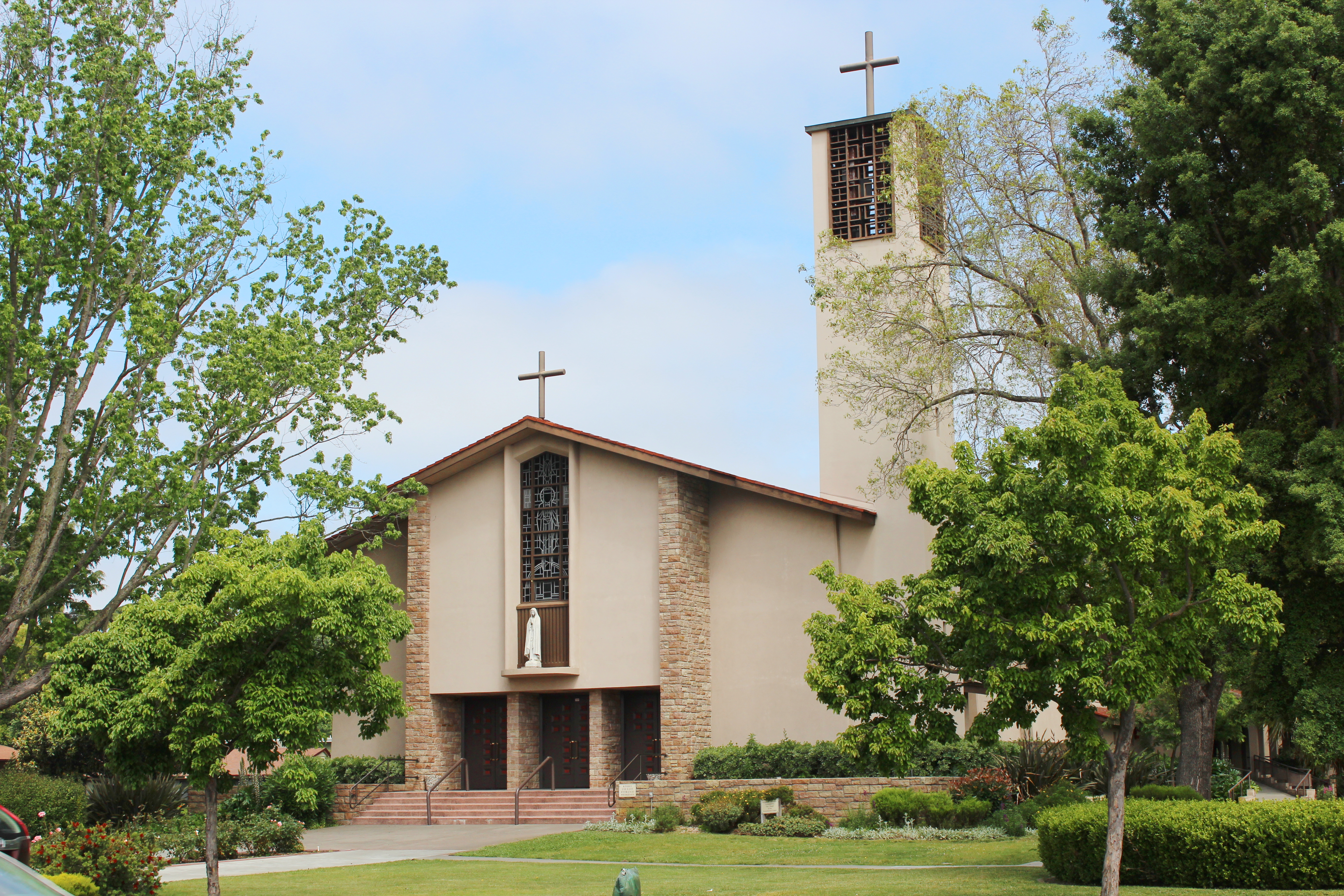
- Entrance of the Cathedral of St. Eugene

- Location in California Cathedral of St. Eugene (the United States)
- 38°26′50″N 122°41′16″W
- Location: 2323 Montgomery Dr . Santa Rosa, California
- Country: United States
- Denomination: Catholic Church
- Sui iuris church: Latin Church
- Website: www.steugenes.com

History
- Status: Cathedral
- Founded: 1950

Architecture
- Style: Modern

Administration
- Diocese: Santa Rosa in California

Clergy
- Bishop: Most Rev. Robert F. Vasa
- Rector: Rev. Frank Epperson

Cathedral of Saint Eugene is a cathedral of the Catholic Church in the United States. It is the mother church and seat of the diocesan bishop of the Diocese of Santa Rosa in California. It is located in the City of Santa Rosa.

== History ==
During the first half of the 20th century, Catholics living in the North Coast of California were either under the jurisdiction of the Archdiocese of San Francisco or the Diocese of Sacramento. In 1950, Archbishop John J. Mitty of San Francisco erected St. Eugene's Parish. The church was dedicated on November 25, 1951. Two years later, the parish opened a school.

Pope John XXIII on January 13, 196, established the Diocese of Santa Rosa. St. Eugene's Church was now designated as the Cathedral of St. Eugene.

== See also ==
- List of Catholic cathedrals in the United States
- List of cathedrals in the United States
- Carrillo Adobe, a historic ruin located on the grounds of the cathedral
