= Kolbe Academy and Trinity Prep =

Location
- 2055 Redwood Road; Napa, California 94558; United States; 38°19′13″N 122°18′44″W

Information
- Type: Private, Coeducational
- Motto: Ad Majorem Dei Gloriam (For the Greater Glory of God)
- Religious affiliation: Roman Catholic
- Established: 1980
- Founders: Lucille Cortese, Vince Cortese, Fran Crotty, Marge Crotty, Dianne Muth, Jerry Muth, Jack Kersting, Tony Ryan
- Principal: John Bertolini
- Faculty: 13
- Grades: K–12
- Colors: Blue and Red
- Mascot: Crusader
- Team name: Crusaders
- Accreditation: National Association of Private Catholic and Independent Schools
- Website: www.kolbetrinity.org

Kolbe Academy & Trinity Prep is a private school in Napa, California. It offers grades from pre-kindergarten through twelfth grade and embraces a classically based Catholic educational model. It is located within the Roman Catholic Diocese of Santa Rosa, though it operates independently.

== Background ==
Kolbe Academy was established in 1980 by Fran & Marge Crotty, Jerry & Dianne Muth, and Vince & Lucille Cortese in Napa, California. In 1995, the academy's homeschooling program, Kolbe Academy, began. Trinity Grammar and Prep was established in 1995 by Jack Kersting, Tony Ryan and others.

The two schools merged in 2008, and the homeschool program split off into an independent homeschool program.

In July of 2026, the school rebranded itself as St. Maximilian Catholic School in order to distinguish itself from the Kolbe Academy homeschool program that is also based in Napa, California.

== Curriculum ==
The school's curriculum is grounded in the Ignatian tradition. The spoken arts of grammar and rhetoric are emphasized. Grade levels at the school are combined in pairs — first-and second graders are in one classroom, third-and fourth graders are in another, for example. Students are exposed to the greatest works of Western Civilization and also study Latin and public speaking.

== History ==
Kolbe Academy was founded in 1980 as a 1st through 7th grade school, with a grade per year added until it was 1st-12th Grades. Trinity Education Center, Inc. was founded in 1991 in Fairfield, California as a home school. In 1995 it began doing business as Trinity Grammar and Prep as a 1st through 12th Grade school with 50 students.

In 2008, the two schools united to form Kolbe Academy & Trinity Prep.
