= Tigias =

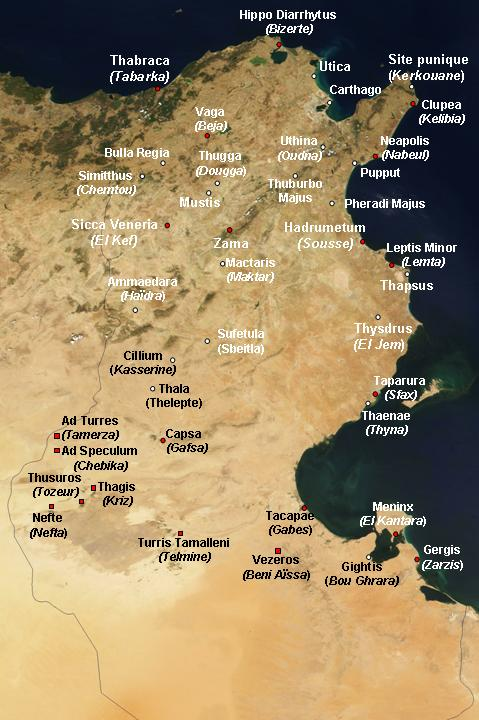
Map showing Tigias

Tigias was a Roman-Berber town in the province of Africa Proconsularis in Byzacena. Its stone ruins are located in Henchir-Taus in the oasis of Kriz, Tunisia.

The city was also the seat of an ancient diocese, which remains a titular see of the Catholic Church. The current bishop is Robert Francis Hennessey of Boston who replaced Jean-Claude Hertzog in 2006.
