= Guardian Angel Cathedral =

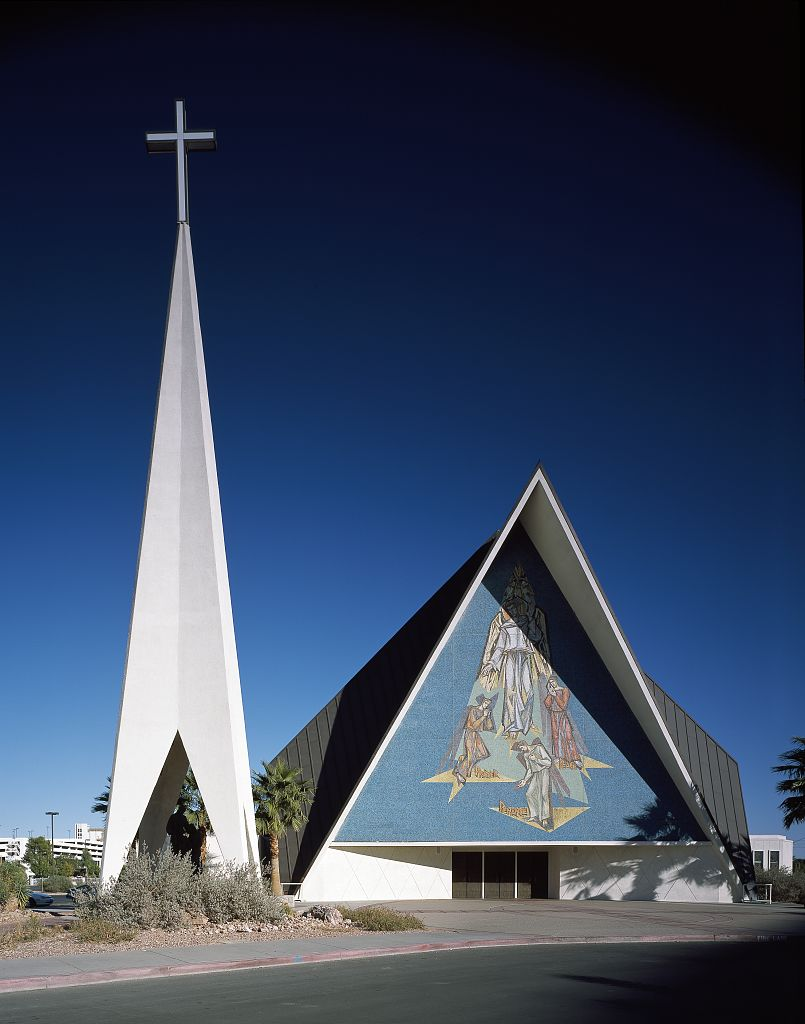

- Location in Nevada Guardian Angel Cathedral (the United States)
- 36°07′50″N 115°09′49″W
- Location: 302 Cathedral Way; Las Vegas, Nevada
- Country: United States
- Denomination: Roman Catholic Church
- Website: www.gaclv.org

History
- Status: Cathedral
- Founded: 1963
- Founder(s): Rev. Richard Crowley, CSV
- Dedication: Guardian Angel

Architecture
- Architect: Paul R. Williams
- Style: Modern
- Completed: 1963

Specifications
- Capacity: 1,100

Administration
- Province: Las Vegas
- Archdiocese: Las Vegas

Clergy
- Archbishop: George Leo Thomas
- Rector: Gregory W. Gordon
- Vicar: Rev. Mugagga Lule

Guardian Angel Cathedral is a Catholic cathedral in Winchester, Nevada, United States, in the Las Vegas Valley. It is located just off of the Las Vegas Strip, north of the Wynn and Encore hotels. It is the seat of the Archdiocese of Las Vegas. Before the establishment of the Diocese of Las Vegas in 1995, it was a parish of the Diocese of Reno.

== History ==
St. Viator Church was built on the site of the former city dump in 1955. The ground proved to be unstable and the church was condemned and torn down six months after it opened. The Rev. Richard Crowley, CSV, now churchless, approached Moe Dalitz to donate land on the Las Vegas Strip. Although Jewish, Dalitz liked the idea of having a church convenient for his casino workers. He donated land near the Desert Inn in 1961. Dalitz was familiar with the work of Los Angeles architect Paul R. Williams and approached him to design the new church. Guardian Angel Shrine was opened on October 2, 1963. In 1977 Bishop Norman McFarland of the recently re-designated Diocese of Reno-Las Vegas chose the shrine as the co-cathedral. The diocese was divided in 1995 and the Diocese of Las Vegas was established. Guardian Angel retained its status as a cathedral. The cathedral was renovated for $1.3 million in 1995.

== Architecture ==
Architect Paul R. Williams used an A-frame design for the church structure. A four-sided spire capped with a cross is located to the front left of the cathedral. At its base is a statue of the Holy Family. There is a large mosaic over the main entrance of the cathedral by Los Angeles artist Edith Piczek. It represents the Guardian Angel with three figures: Penance, Prayer and Peace. She also created the mural on the rear chancel wall, which is titled The Final Beginning. The stained glass windows, which depict the Stations of the Cross, are by her sister Isabel Piczek. They are located in 12 triangular niches that bisect the A-frame. A large crucifix is suspended from the ceiling above the altar and in front of the chancel mural. There is seating for 1,100 people in the cathedral. The pews on the main floor are divided into four sections across the nave, and a deep gallery above the main entrance. The Blessed Sacrament is housed in a chapel to the right of the altar, and the Lady chapel is located on the opposite side of the cathedral.

== In popular culture ==
The church is featured in the music video for the song "Boots" by Las Vegas native rock band the Killers, in which the main character of the video goes to pray inside the church.

== Gallery ==
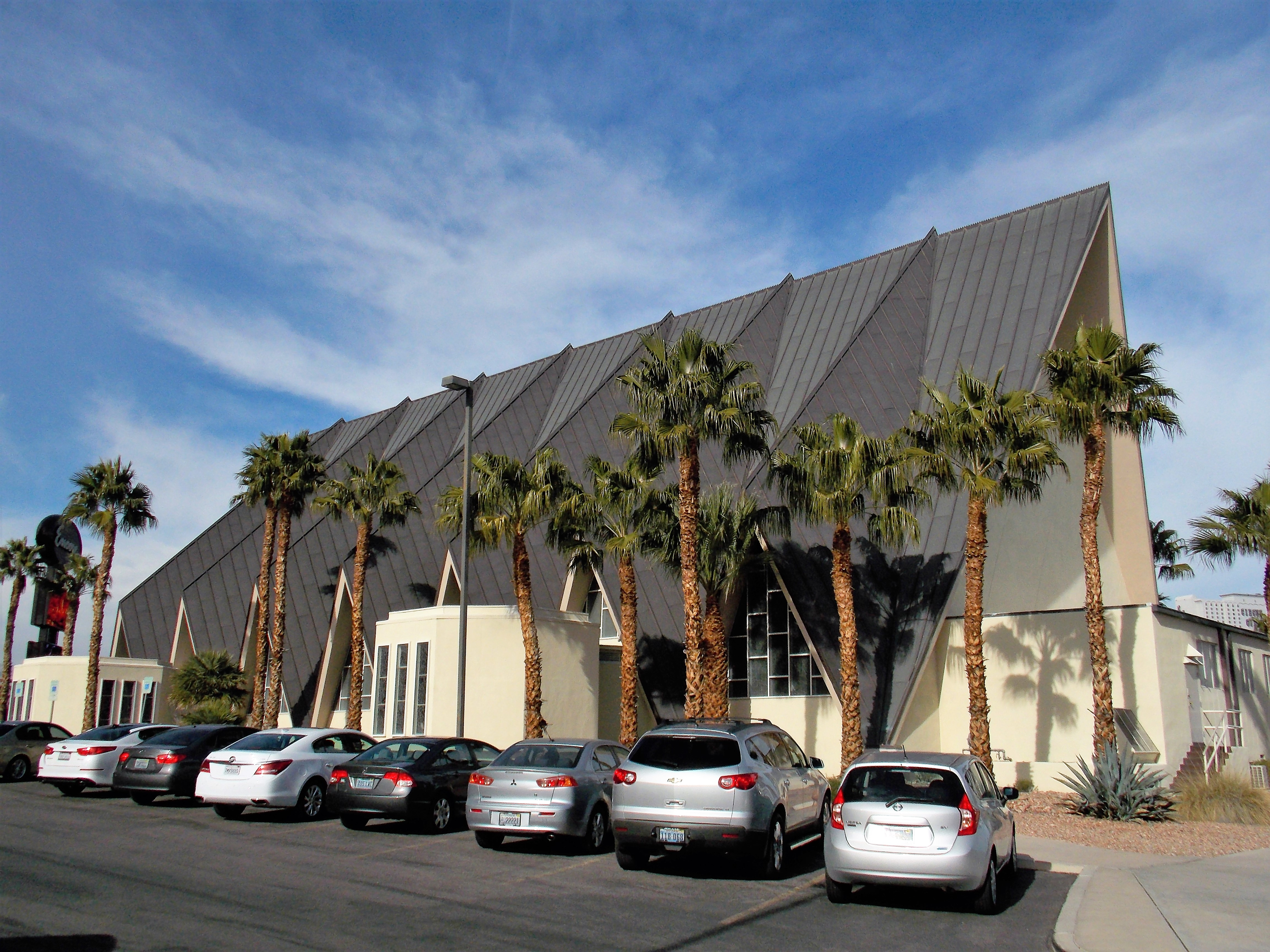
Exterior detail

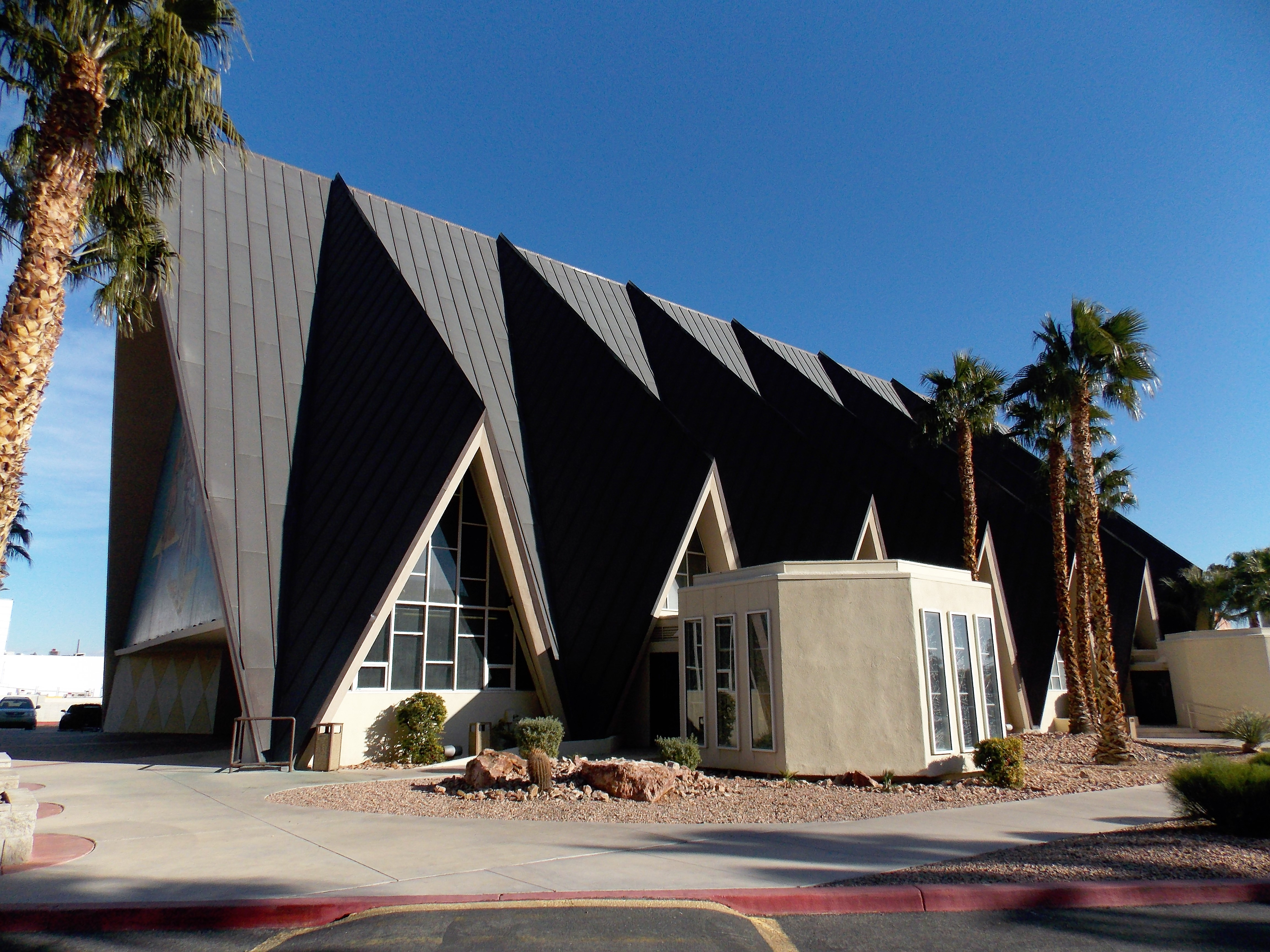
Exterior detail

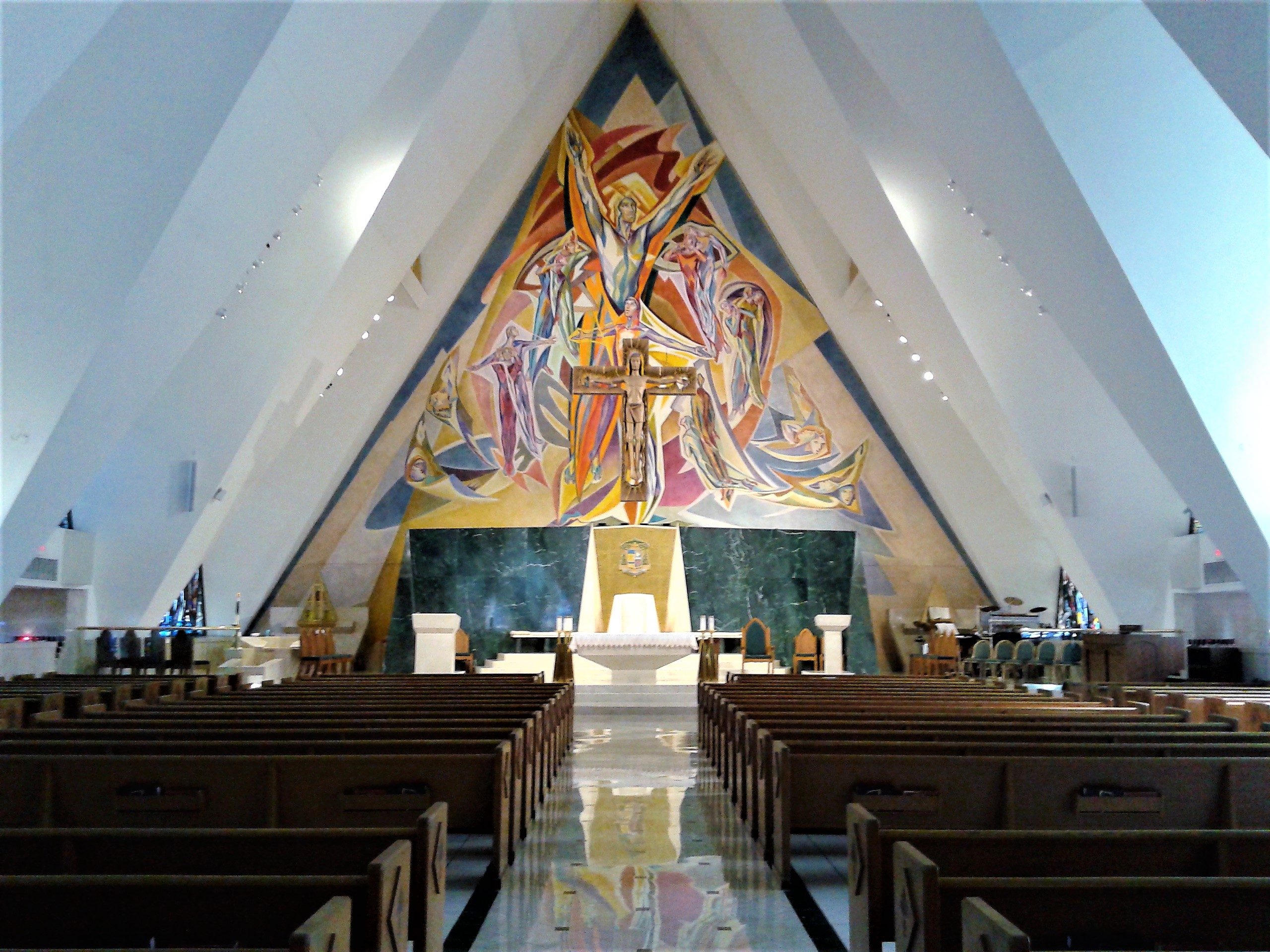
View up the nave to the sanctuary

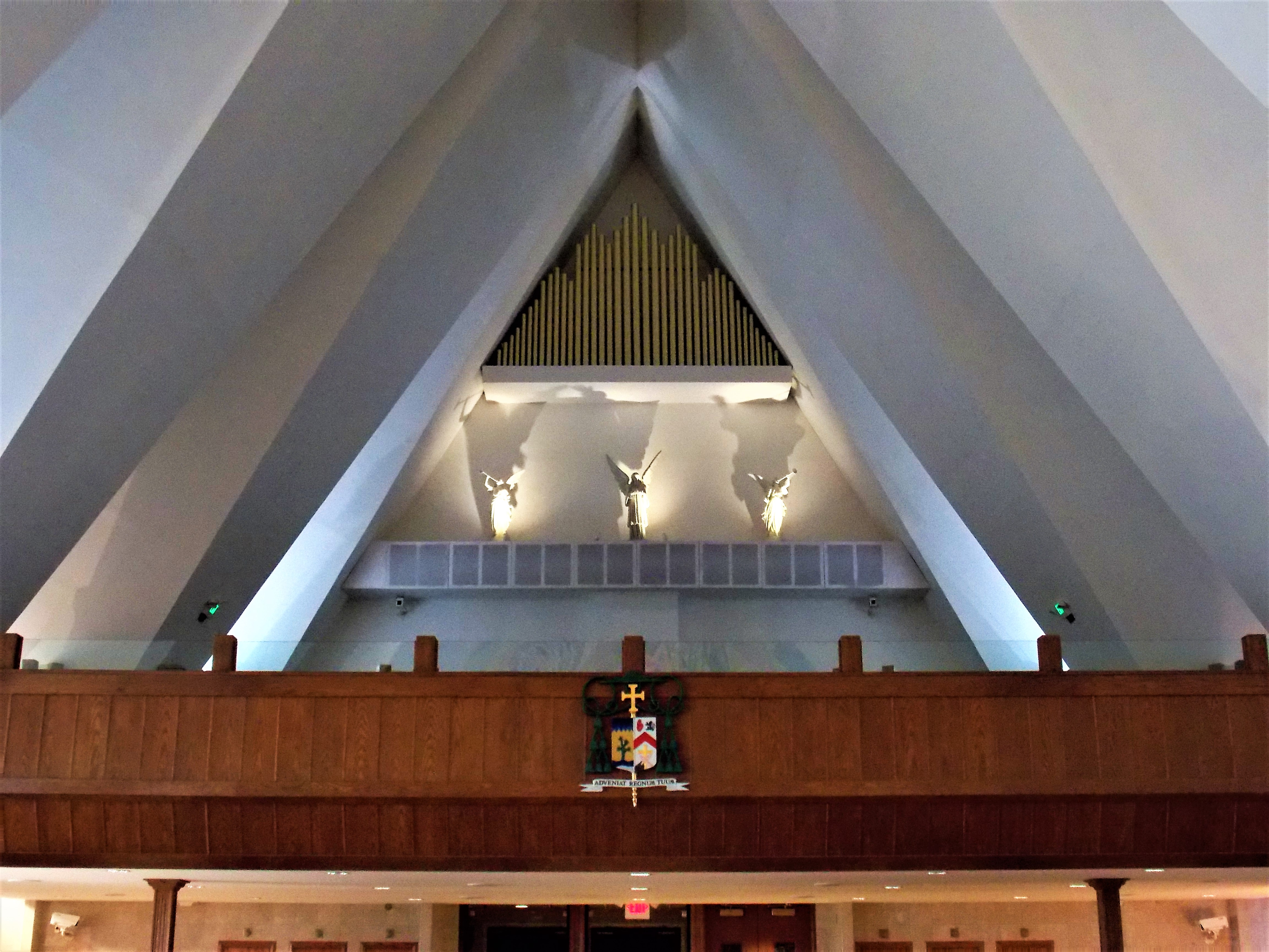
Rear gallery

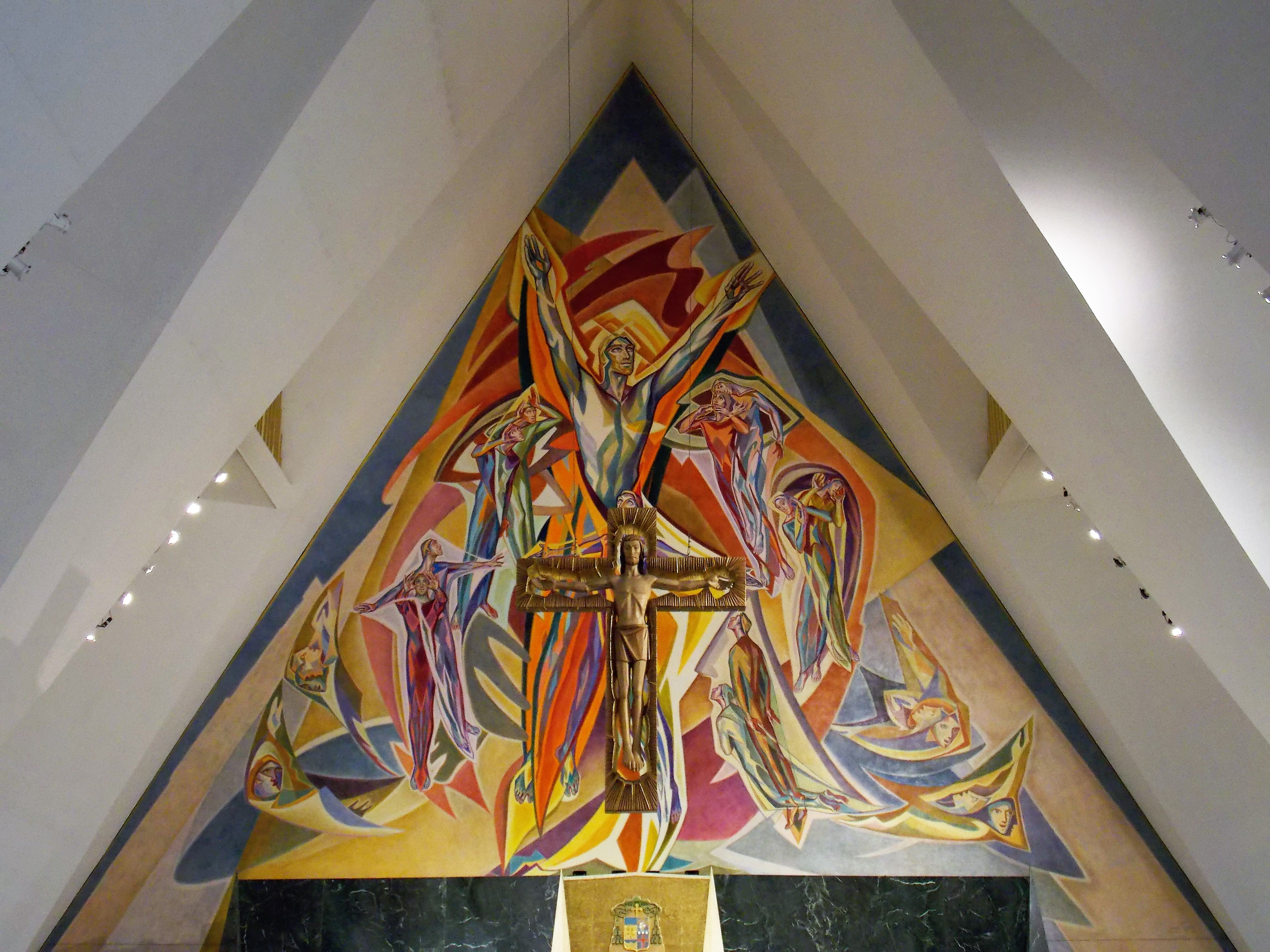
Detail of Chancel mural: The Final Beginning

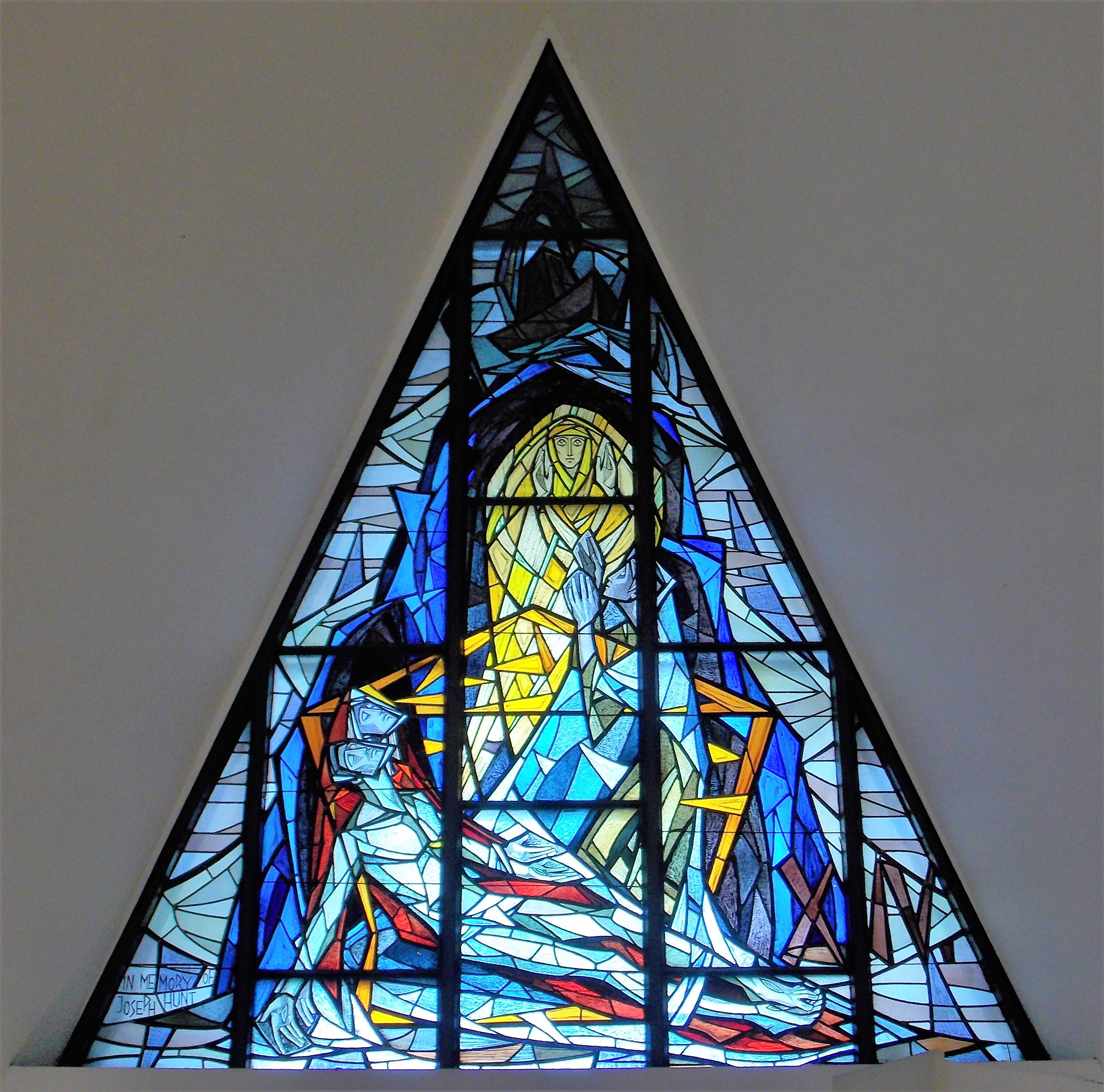
Stained glass window: Station 14

== See also ==
- List of churches in the Roman Catholic Archdiocese of Las Vegas
