= Daniel F. Walsh =

American Catholic prelate (born 1937)

His Excellency, The Most Reverend Daniel Francis Walsh
- Bishop Emeritus of Santa Rosa
- Diocese: Santa Rosa
- Appointed: April 11, 2000
- Installed: May 22, 2000
- Retired: June 30, 2011
- Predecessor: George Patrick Ziemann
- Successor: Robert F. Vasa
- Previous posts: Bishop of Las Vegas (1995-2000); Bishop of Reno-Las Vegas (1987-1995); Auxiliary Bishop of San Francisco and Titular Bishop of Tigias (1981-1987)

Orders
- Ordination: March 30, 1963 by Joseph Thomas McGucken
- Consecration: September 24, 1981 by John R. Quinn, Michael Hughes Kenny, and Joseph Anthony Ferrario

Personal details
- Born: October 2, 1937 (age 88) San Francisco, California, U.S.
- Education: Catholic University of America
- Motto: Adveniat regnum tuum (Thy kingdom come)

Styles of Daniel Francis Walsh
- Reference style: His Excellency; The Most Reverend
- Spoken style: Your Excellency
- Religious style: Bishop

Daniel Francis Walsh (born October 2, 1937) is an American prelate of the Roman Catholic Church.

Born in San Francisco, California, Walsh first served as an auxiliary bishop of the Archdiocese of San Francisco in California from 1981 to 1987, then as bishop of the Diocese of Reno-Las Vegas in Nevada from 1987 to 1995. With the creation of the Diocese of Las Vegas, Walsh served there as bishop from 1995 to 2000. Walsh then served as bishop of the Diocese of Santa Rosa in California from 2000 to 2011.

== Early life and priesthood ==
Daniel Francis Walsh was born on October 2, 1937, in San Francisco, California. He attend St. Anne's School before entering St. Joseph High School in Mountain View, California.

Walsh was ordained to the priesthood for the Archdiocese of San Francisco on March 30, 1963, in the Mission Dolores Basilica in San Francisco by Joseph Thomas McGucken. After his ordination, Walsh served as associate pastor of St. Pius Parish in Redwood City, California. The next year, he went to Washington D.C. to enter the Catholic University of America.

From 1966 to 1970, Walsh taught at Junípero Serra High School in San Mateo, California. He served as assistant chancellor for the archdiocese from 1970 to 1976. He then held the position of private secretary to Archbishop Joseph McGucken until 1978. Walsh became chancellor of the archdiocese in 1978, and its vicar general in 1981.

== Auxiliary Bishop of San Francisco ==
On July 30, 1981, Pope John Paul II appointed Walsh as an auxiliary bishop of San Francisco and titular bishop of Tigias. He was consecrated on September 24, 1981, by Archbishop John Quinn, with Bishops Michael Kenny and Joseph Ferrario serving as co-consecrators, in the Cathedral of Saint Mary of the Assumption in San Francisco.

== Bishop of Reno-Las Vegas ==
On June 9, 1987, John Paul II appointed Walsh as bishop of Reno-Las Vegas. He was installed on August 6, 1987.

== Bishop of Las Vegas ==
On March 1, 1995, Walsh was appointed as bishop of Las Vegas by John Paul II. This diocese and the new Diocese of Reno had been carved out of the former Diocese of Reno-Las Vegas. Walsh was installed on July 28, 1995.

== Bishop of Santa Rosa ==
On April 11, 2000, John Paul II appointed Walsh as the fifth bishop of Santa Rosa. He was installed on May 22, 2000.

In August 2006, the Sonoma County, California, Sheriff's Office recommended criminal charges be filed against Walsh for not reporting multiple child molestations by Reverend Francisco Ochoa. Ochoa had confessed sexual abuse crimes to Walsh, who immediately suspended him from ministry. However, Walsh failed to report these crimes to police during the five-day time period mandated by law. This delay enabled Ochoa to flee to Mexico to avoid prosecution. The Sonoma County District Attorney's Office eventually approved a plea agreement for Walsh, which called for four months of counseling in lieu of prosecution. Had the plea agreement not been reached, it would have been the first civil prosecution of an American bishop in concealing sex crimes. In September 2007, the diocese settled a lawsuit by ten individuals who alleged they had been sexually abused by Ochoa. The diocese paid them a $5 million settlement, including $20,000 donated by Walsh himself.

Within the United States Conference of Catholic Bishops, Walsh chaired the Committee on World Missions, and sat on the Committee on Evangelization and Catechesis. On January 24, 2011, Pope Benedict XVI appointed Bishop Robert F. Vasa from the Diocese of Baker as coadjutor bishop of Santa Rosa to assist Walsh.

== Retirement ==
On June 30, 2011, Benedict XVI accepted Walsh's resignation as bishop of Santa Rosa and Vasa became his successor. As of 2023, Walsh was residing at St. Anne's Home, a senior citizen facility operated by the Little Sisters of the Poor in San Francisco.

== See also ==
- Catholic Church hierarchy
- Catholic Church in the United States
- Historical list of the Catholic bishops of the United States
- List of Catholic bishops of the United States
- Lists of patriarchs, archbishops, and bishops

Catholic Church titles
Preceded by George Patrick Ziemann	Bishop of Santa Rosa; 2000–2011	Succeeded by Robert F. Vasa
Preceded by First Bishop	Bishop of Las Vegas; 1995–2000	Succeeded by Joseph Anthony Pepe
Preceded by Norman Francis McFarland	Bishop of Reno-Las Vegas; 1987–1995	Succeeded by Phillip Francis Straling
Preceded by -	Auxiliary Bishop of San Francisco; 1981–1987	Succeeded by -
