= Emilio Allué =

Catholic bishop (1935–2020)

His Excellency, The Most Reverend Emilio Allué SDB
- Auxiliary Bishop Emeritus of Boston; Titular Bishop of Croae
- Church: Roman Catholic Church
- Archdiocese: Boston
- Appointed: 24 July 1996
- Installed: 17 September 1996
- Term ended: 30 June 2010
- Other post: Titular Bishop of Croae

Orders
- Ordination: 22 December 1966 by Luigi Traglia
- Consecration: 17 September 1996 by Bernard Francis Law; Theodore Edgar McCarrick; Robert Joseph Banks

Personal details
- Born: Emilio Simeon Allué Carcasona; 18 February 1935 Huesca, Aragon, Spain
- Died: 26 April 2020 (aged 85) Boston, Massachusetts, U.S.
- Education: Don Bosco College; Salesian Pontifical University(STL); Fordham University(PhD)
- Motto: Da mihi animas (Give me souls)

Styles of Emilio Simeon Allué Carcasona
- Reference style: His Excellency; The Most Reverend
- Spoken style: Your Excellency
- Religious style: Bishop

Emilio Simeon Allué Carcasona, SDB (18 February 1935 – 26 April 2020) was a Spanish-born American prelate of the Roman Catholic Church in the United States. He served as an auxiliary bishop of the Archdiocese of Boston in Massachusetts from 1996 until his retirement in 2010.

== Life ==
=== Early years ===
Emilio Allué was born in Huesca, Spain, on 18 February 1935 to Domingo and Juliana Carcasona. Allué. After graduating from high school, Allué decided to become a priest. He entered the formation program of the Salesians of Don Bosco religious order in Gerona, Spain, in 1954. He made his first vows in 1956. Later that year, the Salesians sent Allué to Newton, New Jersey, to continue his studies at Don Bosco College.

Allué graduated from Don Bosco in 1959 with a Bachelor of Arts degree in philosophy. The Salesians then assigned him to teach math at Don Bosco Technical High School in Paterson, New Jersey. He was sent to Rome in 1962 to study at the Salesian Pontifical University.

=== Priesthood ===
Emilio Allué was ordained to the priesthood for the Salesian Order by Cardinal Luigi Traglia in Rome at the Salesian University on 22 December 1966. He earned a Licentiate of Sacred Theology from the Salesian University in 1967.

After his ordination, the Salesians assigned Allué in 1967 as the director of campus ministry at the Don Bosco Salesian Junior Seminary in Goshen, New York. He was transferred in 1970 to Don Bosco College to teach theology to the seminarians. Allué returned to Goshen in 1972 to serve as director of the junior seminary. He became a faculty member of Don Bosco Tech in 1975, teaching Spanish, and then as its treasurer in 1977.

Allué was assigned by the Salesians in 1978 to his first parish ministry, serving as an assistant pastor at Mary Help of Christians Parish in New York City and as administrator of St. Ann’s Parish in the city. He was moved in 1980 back to Don Bosco College to act a treasurer there. He received a Doctor of Theology degree from Fordham University in New York City in 1981 while serving at Don Bosco. In 1982, he became pastor of Our Lady of Mt. Carmel Parish in New Brunswick, New Jersey, where he stayed for the next eight years. During this time, Allué directed the Hispanic ministry for the Diocese of Metuchen.

Allué left Our Lady in 1992 to become director of the National Shire of Mary Help of Christians in Haverstraw, New York. He returned to Mary Help of Christians Parish in 1995 to serve as parochial vicar.

=== Auxiliary Bishop of Boston ===
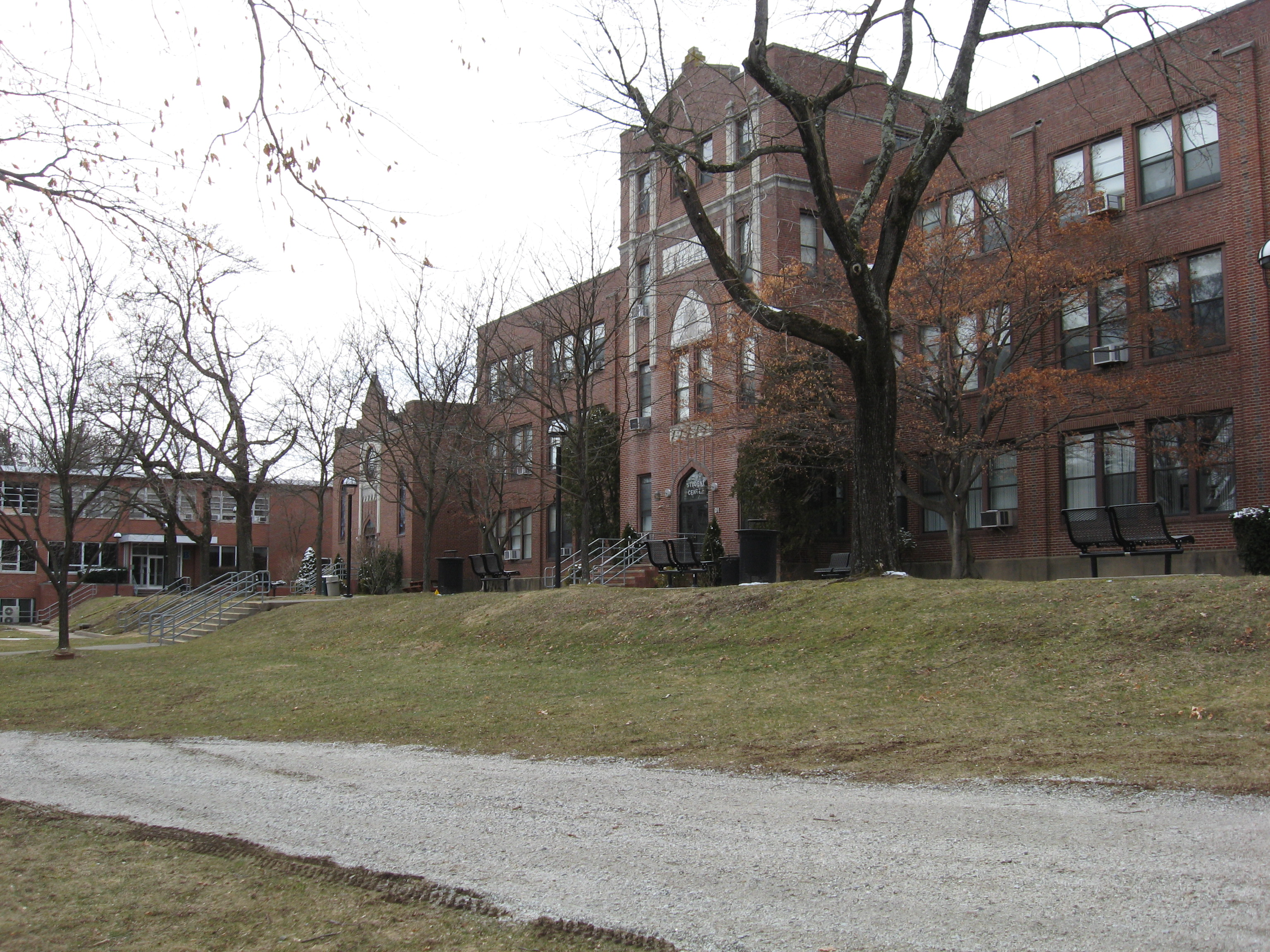
Former Don Bosco College, Newton, New Jersey (2013)

On 24 July 1996, Allué was appointed auxiliary bishop of Boston and titular bishop of Croae by Pope John Paul II. He received his episcopal consecration on 17 September 1996 from Cardinal Bernard Francis Law, with Archbishop Theodore McCarrick and Bishop Robert Banks serving as co-consecrators, at the Cathedral of the Holy Cross in Boston.

As an auxiliary, Allué served as regional bishop of the West Pastoral Region of the archdiocese from 1996 to 2000 and then bishop of the Merrimack Pastoral Region. He was appointed episcopal vicar for the Hispanic apostolate.

On one occasion in 1996, while wearing his episcopal cassock and pectoral cross, Allué was driving from Boston to New Jersey for a church event. While stopped at a toll both, the collector asked: “Is that a costume or are you really a priest? Allué responded, “I have news for you. I am a bishop!”

In 2002, Allué was named in a sexual abuse lawsuit claiming that he ignored credible allegations of abuse by priests during his tenure in 1972 as director of a junior seminary in Goshen. One allegation involved his efforts to expel a student rather than confront the alleged abuser.

=== Retirement and death ===
In February 2010, Allué retired as an auxiliary bishop of Boston. He died on 26 April 2020 at St. Elizabeth Hospital in Boston, after contracting COVID-19 during the COVID-19 pandemic.

== See also ==
- Catholic Church hierarchy
- Catholic Church in the United States
- Historical list of the Catholic bishops of the United States
- List of Catholic bishops of the United States
- Lists of patriarchs, archbishops, and bishops

== Episcopal succession ==
Catholic Church titles
Preceded by –	Auxiliary Bishop Emeritus of Boston; 2010–2020	Succeeded by
Preceded by –	Auxiliary Bishop of Boston; 1996–2010	Succeeded by –
