= George Leo Thomas =

American Catholic prelate (born 1950)

His Excellency, The Most Reverend George Leo Thomas
- Metropolitan Archbishop of Las Vegas
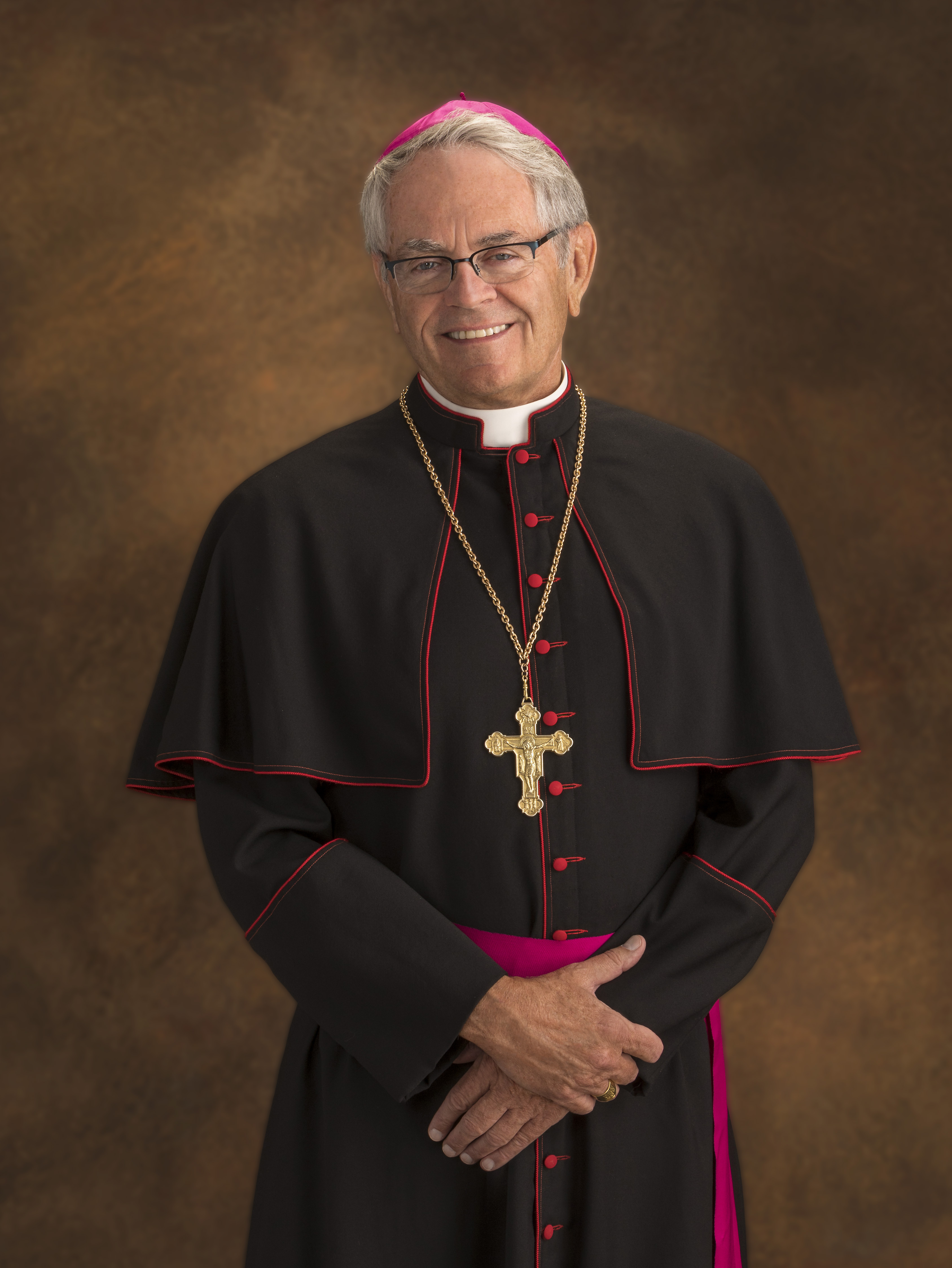
- Thomas in 2018
- Church: Catholic
- See: Las Vegas
- Appointed: May 30, 2023
- Predecessor: Joseph A. Pepe; (as bishop)
- Previous posts: Bishop of Las Vegas (2018–2023); Bishop of Helena (2004-2018); Auxiliary Bishop of Seattle and Titular Bishop of Vagrauta (2000–2004)

Orders
- Ordination: May 22, 1976 by Raymond Hunthausen
- Consecration: January 28, 2000 by Alexander Joseph Brunett, William S. Skylstad, and Carlos Arthur Sevilla

Personal details
- Born: May 19, 1950 (age 76) Anaconda, Montana, US
- Denomination: Catholic
- Parents: George and Mary (née Cronin) Thomas
- Education: Carroll College; St. Thomas Seminary; University of Washington
- Motto: Christ our light

Styles of George Leo Thomas
- Reference style: His Excellency; The Most Reverend
- Spoken style: Your Excellency
- Religious style: Archbishop

Ordination history of George Leo Thomas
History
Priestly ordination
- Ordained by: Raymond Hunthausen
Episcopal consecration
- Principal consecrator: Alexander Brunett
- Co-consecrators: William S. Skylstad; Carlos Sevilla, SJ
Episcopal succession
Bishops consecrated by George Leo Thomas as principal consecrator
- Gregory W. Gordon: July 16, 2021

George Leo Thomas (born May 19, 1950) is an American Catholic prelate who serves as archbishop of the Archdiocese of Las Vegas. He served as bishop of the Diocese of Las Vegas from 2018 until its elevation as an archdiocese in 2023.

Thomas previously served as bishop of the Diocese of Helena in Montana from 2004 to 2018 and as an auxiliary bishop of the Archdiocese of Seattle in Washington State from 1999 to 2004.

== Early life and education ==
George Thomas was born on May 19, 1950, in Anaconda, Montana, as the second of the five children of George and Mary (née Cronin) Thomas. Raised in Butte, Montana, he graduated from Butte Central Catholic High School in 1968. Thomas studied at Carroll College in Helena, Montana, obtaining his bachelor's degree in literature in 1972. Deciding to become a priest, Thomas then studied at St. Thomas Seminary in Bothell, Washington, earning his Master of Divinity degree there in 1976.

== Priesthood ==
Thomas was ordained to the priesthood for the Archdiocese of Seattle at St. James Cathedral in Seattle by Archbishop Raymond Hunthausen on May 22, 1976. After his ordination, Thomas served as associate pastor at Holy Family Parish in Kirkland, Washington, and then at St. James Cathedral Parish.

Thomas was then named as parish administrator at Sacred Heart Parish in Bellevue, Washington, and Holy Innocents Mission Church in Duvall, Washington Thomas also performed chaplain work for the King County Correctional Facility, the Seattle City Jail, and the Missionary Sisters of the Sacred Heart center, all in Seattle. For 10 years, he served as chair of the board for Catholic Community Services in the archdiocese

Thomas entered graduate school at the University of Washington in Seattle in 1981 and received a Master of Arts degree in counseling and community mental health in 1983. In 1986, he earned a doctor of philosophy degree, specializing in the mission history of the American Pacific Northwest.

Thomas became chancellor and vicar general the archdiocese in 1987. He was named as apostolic administrator for the archdiocese following the death of Archbishop Thomas Murphy in 1997. He served as both chancellor and vicar general until 2004.

== Auxiliary Bishop of Seattle ==
On November 19, 1999, Thomas was named as an auxiliary bishop of Seattle and as titular bishop of Vagrauta by Pope John Paul II. He received his episcopal consecration on January 28, 2000, at St. James Cathedral from Archbishop Alexander Brunett, with Bishops William S. Skylstad and Carlos Sevilla serving as co-consecrators.

== Bishop of Helena ==
John Paul II named Thomas as the tenth bishop of Helena on March 23, 2004; he was installed on June 4, 2004.

== Bishop of Las Vegas ==
On February 28, 2018, Thomas was appointed as bishop of Las Vegas by Pope Francis. He succeeded the retiring Bishop Joseph A. Pepe, and was installed on May 15, 2018.

In January 2022, Thomas wrote a column asking Catholic politicians who support abortion legislation not to present themselves for communion at Mass in his diocese.

== Archbishop of Las Vegas ==
On May 30, 2023, Thomas was named by Francis as the first archbishop of the newly created Archdiocese of Las Vegas.

== See also ==
- Catholic Church hierarchy
- Catholic Church in the United States
- Historical list of the Catholic bishops of the United States
- List of Catholic bishops of the United States
- Lists of patriarchs, archbishops, and bishops

Catholic Church titles
Preceded by Joseph A. Pepe	Bishop/Archbishop of Las Vegas; 2018–present	Incumbent
Preceded by Robert Charles Morlino	Bishop of Helena; 2004–2018	Succeeded by Austin Anthony Vetter
Preceded by -	Auxiliary Bishop of Seattle; 1999-2004	Succeeded by -
