= Archdiocese of Las Vegas =

Latin Catholic territory in Nevada, US

Coordinates: 36°10′30″N 115°08′11″W

Archdiocese of Las Vegas Archidiœcesis Campensis
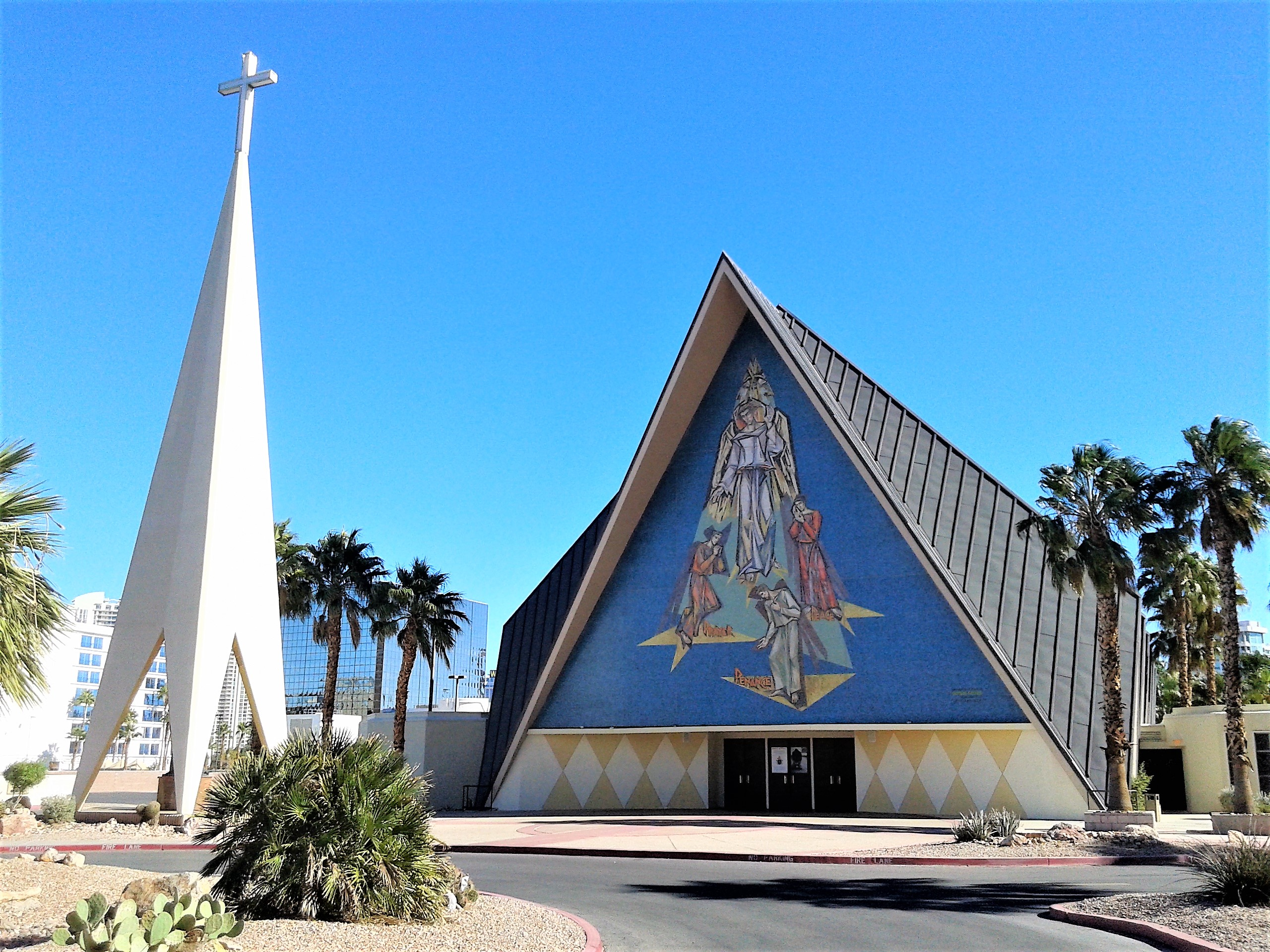
- Guardian Angel Cathedral

- Coat of arms

Location
- Country: United States
- Territory: Counties of Clark, Esmeralda, Lincoln, Nye, and White Pine
- Ecclesiastical province: Las Vegas

Statistics
- Area: 39,688 sq mi (102,790 km^{2})
- Population: Total; Catholics: (as of 2018); 2,263,946; 620,000 (27.4%)

Information
- Denomination: Catholic Church
- Sui iuris church: Latin Church
- Rite: Roman Rite
- Established: March 21, 1995; 31 years ago (as Diocese of Las Vegas); May 30, 2023; 3 years ago (elevated to archdiocese)
- Cathedral: Guardian Angel Cathedral
- Patron saint: Holy Family; St. Peter the Apostle; St. Paul the Apostle

Current leadership
- Pope: Leo XIV
- Archbishop: George Leo Thomas
- Auxiliary Bishops: Gregory W. Gordon
- Vicar General: Gregory W. Gordon
- Judicial Vicar: Robert M. Herbst
- Bishops emeritus: Joseph A. Pepe

Map
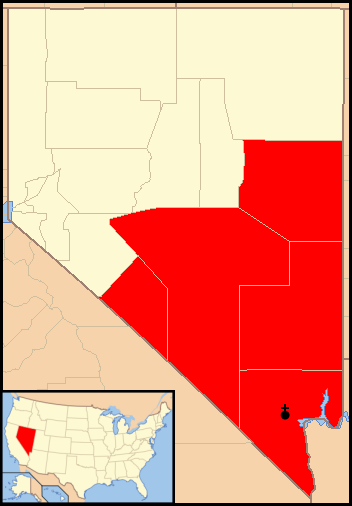

Website
- lvcatholic.org

The Archdiocese of Las Vegas (Latin: Archidiœcesis Campensis) is an archdiocese of the Catholic Church in southern Nevada in the United States. The seat of the archdiocese is Guardian Angel Cathedral in Las Vegas. The see had been a suffragan diocese of the Archdiocese of San Francisco from its creation in 1995 until 2023, when Las Vegas was elevated as a metropolitan see.

== Territory ==
The Archdiocese of Las Vegas comprises Clark, Esmeralda, Lincoln, Nye and White Pine Counties.

== History ==
=== Missionary territory (1776–1931) ===
The first Catholic mass in Southern Nevada was celebrated in 1776 in present-day Laughlin by the Franciscan missionary Francisco Garcés, traveling from Mexico when the entire region was part of the Spanish Empire. Unlike other areas on the Pacific Coast and the Southwest, Spain did not establish any missions in Nevada.

During the early 19th century, the few Catholics in Southern Nevada were under the jurisdiction of the Archdiocese of San Francisco. However, in 1887, the Vatican erected the Apostolic Vicariate of Salt Lake City, which included all of Nevada. Bishop Lawrence Scanlan of Salt Lake City established the first parish in the region in Pioche in the late 1880s. He ministered to the Catholic population scattered throughout Southern Nevada.

The first parish in Ely was Sacred Heart, erected in 1906. In 1908, Scanlan erected St. Joan of Arc, the first parish in Las Vegas. Scanlan said that he chose the name Joan of Arc because the blistering sun in Las Vegas reminded him of her suffering when she was burned at the stake.

=== Territory of the Diocese of Reno (1931–1995) ===
In 1931, Pope Pius XI erected the Diocese of Reno, including all of Nevada. The Southern Nevada region remained part of this diocese for the next 64 years. With the establishment of Boulder City in 1931 to construct Hoover Dam, St. Andrew Parish was created there to serve the Catholic construction workers. St. Peter the Apostle Church was constructed in 1944 in Henderson to serve workers in the defense industry there.St. Rose Dominican Hospital in Henderson was opened by the Adrian Dominican Sisters in 1947. It is now part of Dignity Health.Bishop Gorman High School opened in Las Vegas in 1954, becoming the first Catholic high school in Southern Nevada.

In 1976, Pope Paul VI renamed the Diocese of Reno the Diocese of Reno-Las Vegas to reflect the growth of the Catholic population in southern Nevada. St. Viator Guardian Angel Shrine on the Las Vegas Strip was designated in 1977 as the Guardian Angel Co-Cathedral for the diocese.

=== Formation as the Diocese of Las Vegas (1995–2023) ===
In 1995, Pope John Paul II divided the Diocese of Reno-Las Vegas into the Diocese of Reno and the Diocese of Las Vegas. He appointed Daniel F. Walsh, previously bishop of Reno-Las Vegas, as the first bishop of Las Vegas. Guardian Angel remained as the cathedral for the new diocese.

The second bishop of Las Vegas was Joseph A. Pepe of the Archdiocese of Santa Fe, who took office in 2001. In 2002, six families sued the diocese, along with Bishops Pepe and Walsh, claiming Mark Roberts had physically and sexually abused them as minors between 1996 and 1999. In 2004, Roberts pleaded guilty of open or gross lewdness and four counts of child abuse and neglect, and was sentenced to three years probation and inpatient psychological treatment.

In 2003, Pepe dedicated the Our Lady of La Vang Vietnamese Catholic Community in Las Vegas as a shrine. In 2004, he opened a diocese human resources department along with an Office of Hispanic Ministry, an Office of Liturgy and Worship and a diocesan Office of Archives. In 2007, Pepe re-dedicated Bishop Gorman High School.

In 2007, George Chaanine, a priest at Our Lady of Las Vegas Parish, was sentenced to four to 12 years in state prison for assault. Chaanine had physically and sexually assaulted Michaelina Bellamy, the events coordinator for the parish, then evaded arrest for six days. Bellamy's injuries included a broken hand and two large gashes to her head. Chaanine later said he was in love with Bellamy and investigators found evidence that he provided her with financial support.

On February 28, 2018, Pope Francis accepted Pepe's letter of resignation as bishop of Las Vegas after he reached the mandatory retirement age of 75.

=== Elevation to archdiocese (2018–present) ===
George Leo Thomas, previously bishop of the Diocese of Helena, was appointed bishop of Las Vegas on February 28, 2018, and was installed as bishop on May 15, 2018. In April 2019, the diocese published a list of 33 clergy with credible accusations of sexual abuse of minors. The list went back several decades, when the diocese was part of the Diocese of Reno.

On May 30, 2023, Francis elevated the Diocese of Las Vegas to an archdiocese and established the new ecclesiastical province of Las Vegas, with the Dioceses of Reno and Salt Lake City as suffragan dioceses. Bishop Thomas was named the first archbishop of the archdiocese.

== Bishops ==
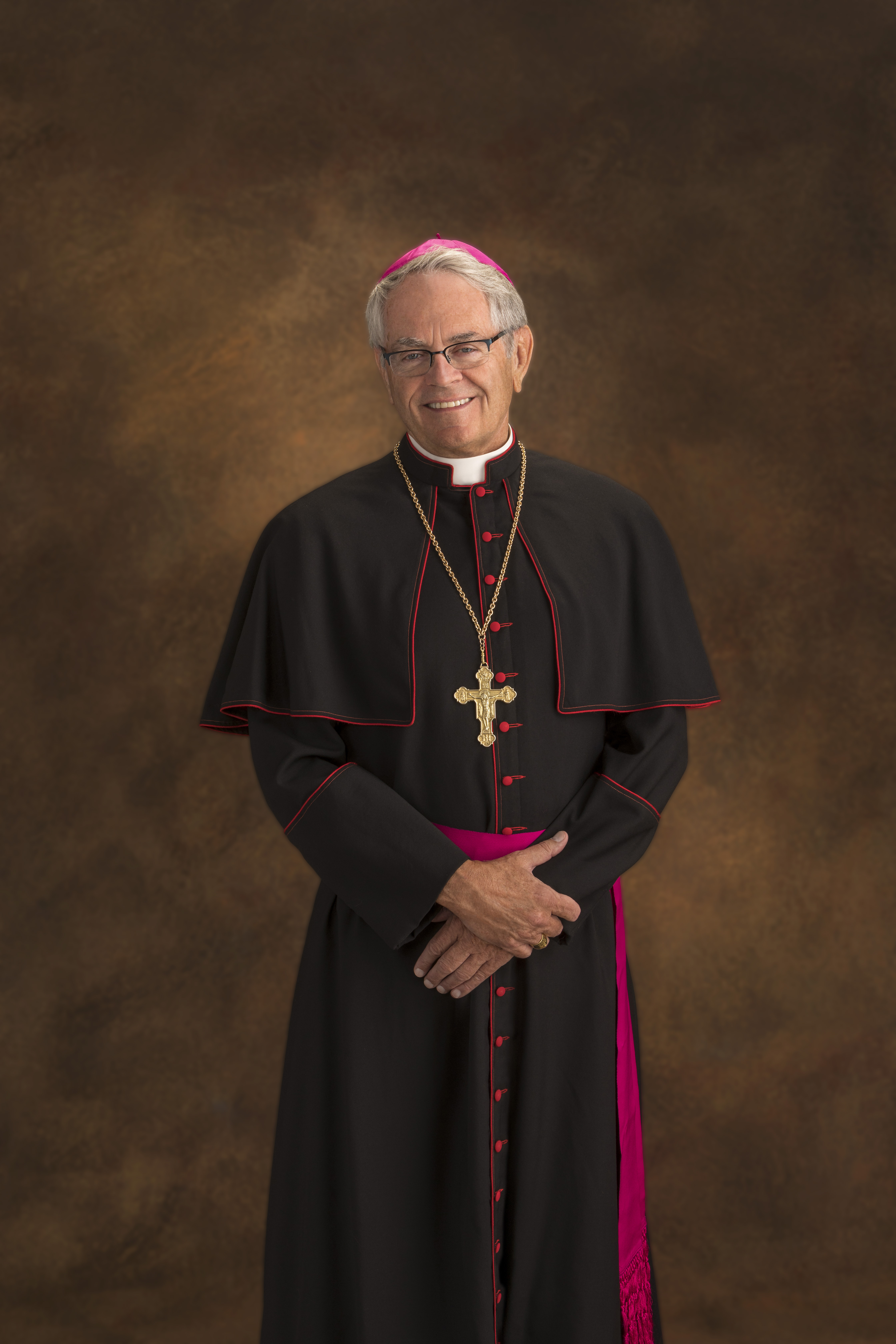
Bishop Thomas (2018)

=== Bishops of Las Vegas ===
1. Daniel F. Walsh (1995–2000), appointed Bishop of Santa Rosa in California
2. Joseph A. Pepe (2001–2018)
3. George Leo Thomas (2018–2023); elevated to Archbishop of Las Vegas

=== Archbishops of Las Vegas ===
1. George Leo Thomas (2023–present)

=== Auxiliary bishops ===
1. Gregory W. Gordon (2021–present)

== Education ==
=== High School ===
- Bishop Gorman High School – Las Vegas
