= Andres Cantoria Ligot =

Filipino American Catholic prelate (born 1965)

His Excellency, The Most Reverend Andres Cantoria Ligot
- Auxiliary Bishop of San José in California
- Diocese: San José in California
- Appointed: August 29, 2025
- Other post: Titular Bishop of Croae

Orders
- Ordination: June 14, 1992 by Pope John Paul II
- Consecration: November 3, 2025 by Oscar Cantú, José Horacio Gómez, and Oscar Solis

Personal details
- Born: November 30, 1965 (age 60) Laoag City, Philippines
- Education: San Pablo Seminary; Bidasoa International Seminary; University of Santo Tomas; University of Navarra
- Motto: Lex Christi caritas est (Latin for 'The law of Christ is love')
- Styles
- Reference style: His Excellency; The Most Reverend
- Spoken style: Your Excellency
- Religious style: Bishop

Ordination history
History
Priestly ordination
- Ordained by: Pope John Paul II
- Date: 14 June 1992
- Place: St. Peter's Basilica
Episcopal consecration
- Principal consecrator: Oscar Cantú
- Co-consecrators: Oscar Solis; José Horacio Gómez
- Date: 03 November 2025
- Place: Our Lady of La Vang Parish, San Jose, California

Andres Cantoria Ligot (born November 30, 1965) is a Filipino American Catholic serving as auxiliary bishop for the Diocese of San José in California since 2025.

== Biography ==
=== Early life and education ===
Ligot was born on November 30, 1965, in Laoag in the Philippines. He studied high school at St. Mary's Seminary, a minor seminary in Laoag. In 1986, he graduated from San Pablo Seminary in Baguio with a degree in philosophy. He studied theology for two years at the San Jose Seminary at Ateneo de Manila University before transferring to the Bidasoa International Seminary in Pamplona. He then received a master's degree in philosophy from University of Santo Tomas in Manila in 1988. He went on to study at the University of Navarra in Pamplona, receiving a bachelor's degree in sacred theology and a master's degree in theology in 1992, a Licentiate of Canon Law in 1997, and a Doctorate of Canon Law in 1999.

=== Priesthood ===
On June 14, 1992, Ligot was ordained to the priesthood by Pope John Paul II at St. Peter's Basilica and assigned to the Diocese of Laoag, where he served as a parochial vicar and director of the national office for the Catholic School of Evangelization for Asia. In 1999, Laoag Bishop Edmundo Abaya granted him permission to minister in California, where he served in the Archdiocese of San Francisco as a chaplain at the San Francisco VA Medical Center and the Church of the Nativity in Menlo Park. Subsequently, he served in the Diocese of San José in California for several years before his incardination into the diocese on March 30, 2004.

=== Auxiliary Bishop of San José ===
On August 29, 2025, Pope Leo XIV appointed Ligot as auxiliary bishop of San José and titular bishop of Croae. Ligot was consecrated as a bishop on November 3, 2025, at Our Lady of La Vang Parish.

== Personal life ==
Ligot speaks Tagalog, Ilocano, Spanish, and English. He is the nephew of Victorino Cristobal Ligot, the first bishop of the Diocese of San Fernando de La Union in the Philippines.

== See also ==
- Catholic Church hierarchy
- Catholic Church in the United States
- Historical list of the Catholic bishops of the United States
- List of Catholic bishops of the United States
- Lists of patriarchs, archbishops, and bishops

== Episcopal succession ==
Catholic Church titles
Preceded by Bruce Lewandowski	— TITULAR — Bishop of Croae; 2025–present	Incumbent
Preceded by Thomas Anthony Daly	Auxiliary Bishop of San José in California; 2025-present	Succeeded by -
