= Chanel College, Dublin =

Co-educational secondary school in Dublin, Ireland

Chanel College
- Coláiste Chanel
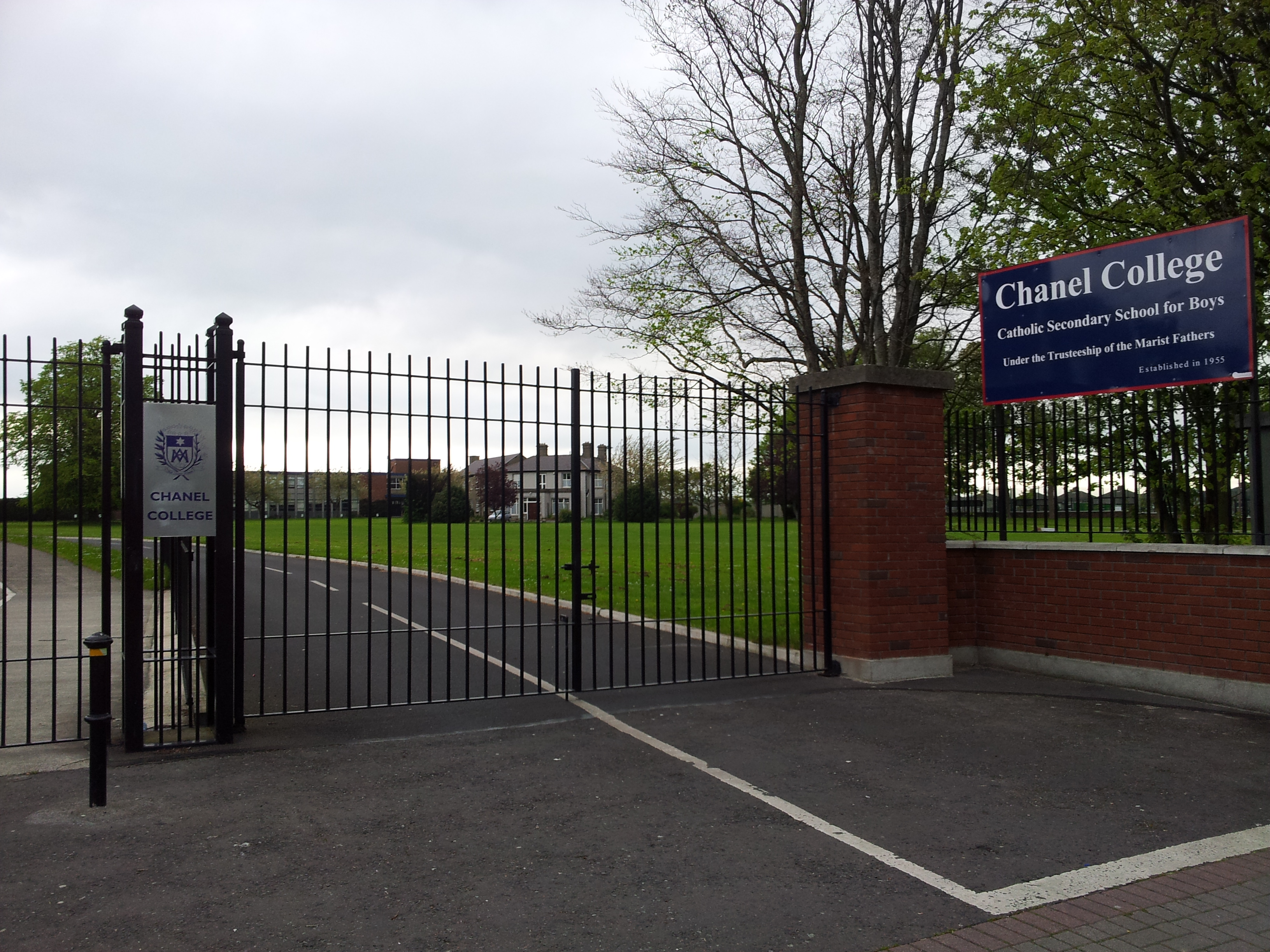
- Chanel College main building, 2019

Location
- Coolock Village, Malahide Road, Dublin 5 Coolock, Dublin, Ireland; Dublin City, County Dublin, Leinster, D05 EY86; Ireland; 53°23′17.2″N 6°12′13.5″W

Information
- School type: Secondary school
- Religious affiliation: Roman Catholic
- Opened: 1955; 71 years ago
- Founder: Marist Fathers
- Status: Open (Monday to Friday)
- Principal: Dara Gill
- Years offered: 6
- Gender: Mixed
- Age range: 12–19
- Enrollment: 466 (Male); 0 (Female) (2025)
- Language: English, Gaelic, French, Spanish, German
- Hours in school day: 6.5 hours
- Sports: Gaelic football, football, rugby, basketball, hurling, badminton, debating, cross country running
- Website: chanelcollege.ie
- Last updated: May 2, 2026

Chanel College (Irish: Coláiste Chanel) is a Catholic co-educational secondary school in Coolock, Dublin, Ireland. As of 2026, the principal is Dara Gill, and the school has approximately 466 pupils.

== History ==
The school opened in 1955 with 12 pupils in the first year. It was the year after the canonisation of Saint Peter Chanel (one of the early Marists and the first to be canonised) and so the college was named in his honour. The main part of the school was built in the late sixties. Chanel was the third school to be opened by the Marist Fathers in Ireland, coming after Catholic University School (CUS) in 1867, and St Mary's College, Dundalk in 1861.

== Sports facilities ==
In 2012, Chanel transferred some of its sports fields to the neighbouring Parnells GAA club, which built a new sports complex on the site consisting of several floodlit all-weather pitches, training facilities, and a social centre. Chanel has the use of these facilities. It subsequently sold much of its campus to developers, who have built private housing on the approach to the school.

== Community involvement ==
Chanel College has been involved in Civic Link since 2001. In the first year, they were linked to St. Joseph's High School, Derry. Subsequently, they were linked to Knockbreda High School, Belfast, and Ballycastle High School, County Antrim. They are currently linked with Keithryan High School, County Antrim.

Chanel joined the National Foundation for Teaching Entrepreneurship programme in 2006.

== Change to co-educational operation ==
In September 2026, Chanel College became a co-educational school. It also introduced home economics as a new subject, along with launching a new building and more classrooms. In the first year of the co-educational changes, there were approximately 15 new pupils, mostly girls.

== Notable past pupils ==
- Terence Flanagan (b. 1975) - Dublin City Councillor and former Teachta Dála for Dublin North East (2007-2016)
- Ian Lawlor (b. 1994) - professional football goalkeeper
- Patrick Joseph McGrath (1945-2023) - Bishop of San Jose, California (1999-2009)
- Alex White (b. 1958) - Politician, former Teachta Dála for Dublin South
- G. V. Wright (b. 1947) - politician, senator and Teachta Dála

== Uniforms ==
(This information was sourced from the manufacturer's website)

=== Regular Uniform ===
- Grey trousers
- Navy Chanel College jumper with school crest
- Blue shirt
- Fully black shoes or runners - no coloured stripes/soles/logos, etc.
- Navy Chanel College jacket with school crest (winter option is available)

=== PE Uniform ===
(to be worn only on PE days):

- Navy Chanel College tracksuit bottoms with crest
- Navy Chanel College T-shirt with crest
- Navy Chanel College ¼ zip PE top
- Official Chanel College jacket with crest
