= Patrick J. McGrath =

Irish-American Catholic bishop (1945–2023)

His Excellency, The Most Reverend Patrick Joseph McGrath
- Bishop of San José in California
- McGrath in 2007
- Church: Cathedral Basilica of St. Joseph
- Diocese: San Jose
- Appointed: June 30, 1998
- Installed: November 27, 1999
- Term ended: May 1, 2019
- Predecessor: Pierre DuMaine
- Successor: Oscar Cantú
- Previous posts: Coadjutor bishop of San Jose (1998–1999); Auxiliary bishop of San Francisco and Titular bishop of Allegheny (1989–1998)

Orders
- Ordination: June 7, 1970 by Michael Russell
- Consecration: January 25, 1989 by John R. Quinn, Mark Joseph Hurley, and Michael Joseph Kaniecki

Personal details
- Born: June 11, 1945 Dublin, Ireland
- Died: May 7, 2023 (aged 77)
- Denomination: Roman Catholic
- Education: Chanel College, Dublin
- Motto: Together in Christ
- Coat of arms

Styles of Patrick Joseph McGrath
- Reference style: His Excellency; The Most Reverend
- Spoken style: Your Excellency
- Religious style: Bishop

Patrick Joseph McGrath (/məˈɡrɔː/ meh-GRAW; June 11, 1945 – May 7, 2023) was an Irish-born American prelate of the Roman Catholic Church. He served as coadjutor bishop and bishop of the Diocese of San Jose in California from 1998 to 2019 and as an auxiliary bishop of the Roman Catholic Archdiocese of San Francisco from 1989 to 1998.

== Biography ==
=== Early life ===
Patrick McGrath was born in Dublin, Ireland, on June 11, 1945. He was the youngest of three sons of Patrick Joseph McGrath, Sr., and Eileen Gaule McGrath. For secondary school, Patrick McGrath attended Chanel College in Dublin. In 1964, at age 19, McGrath entered St. John's Seminary in Waterford, Ireland. His father died while he was in seminary.

=== Priesthood ===
In 1970, McGrath was ordained to the priesthood in Waterford at the Cathedral of the Most Holy Trinity by Bishop Michael Russell for the Archdiocese of San Francisco. McGrath moved to San Francisco, where he was assigned as parochial vicar of St. Anne of the Sunset Parish and as a member of the archdiocesan tribunal.

In 1974, McGrath was sent to Rome to continue his education, earning a Doctor of Canon Law degree from the Pontifical Lateran University on June 11, 1977. After returning to San Francisco. McGrath was appointed the vice-officialis, then officialis, of the archdiocesan tribunal. In 1986, he became pastor, then rector of the Cathedral of St. Mary of the Assumption Parish in San Francisco.

=== Auxiliary Bishop of San Francisco ===
Pope John Paul II appointed McGrath as an auxiliary bishop of San Francisco and titular bishop of Allegheny on December 6, 1988. He was consecrated on January 25, 1989, at the Cathedral of Saint Mary of the Assumption in San Francisco. Archbishop John R. Quinn served as his principal consecrator.

=== Bishop of San Jose ===
Coat of arms as Bishop of San Jose

John Paul II named McGrath as coadjutor bishop of San Jose on June 30, 1998. When Bishop Pierre DuMaine retired on November 27, 1999, McGrath automatically succeeded him.

On August 23, 2018, the diocese, with McGrath's approval, paid US$2.3 million for a 3,269 square foot, five-bedroom home in Silicon Valley to serve as McGrath's retirement residence. McGrath explained that the money for house came from a fund that was dedicated only for housing expenses for retired bishops. However, facing criticism about the purchase, McGrath said a day later that the parish would sell the house and he would eventually retire in a parish rectory instead.

On October 23, 2018, McGrath released a list of 15 priests with credible allegations of sexual abuse against minors. As part of the investigative process, McGrath held several listening sessions with individuals impacted by the alleged crimes.

=== Retirement and death ===
Before having reached the mandatory retirement age of 75 for bishops, McGrath submitted his letter of resignation as bishop of the Diocese of San Jose to Pope Francis. The pope accepted it on May 1, 2019.

McGrath died on May 7, 2023, at the age of 77.

== See also ==
- Catholic Church in the United States
- Hierarchy of the Catholic Church
- Historical list of the Catholic bishops of the United States
- List of Catholic bishops in the United States
- Lists of popes, patriarchs, primates, archbishops, and bishops

Catholic Church titles
Preceded by Pierre DuMaine	Bishop of San Jose; 1999–2019	Succeeded by Oscar Cantú
Preceded by —	Auxiliary Bishop of San Francisco; 1989–1999	Succeeded by —
Preceded by Edward Michael Egan	Titular Bishop of Allegheny; 1989–1999	Succeeded by Robert Joseph McManus
