= Saint Patrick School (San Jose, California) =

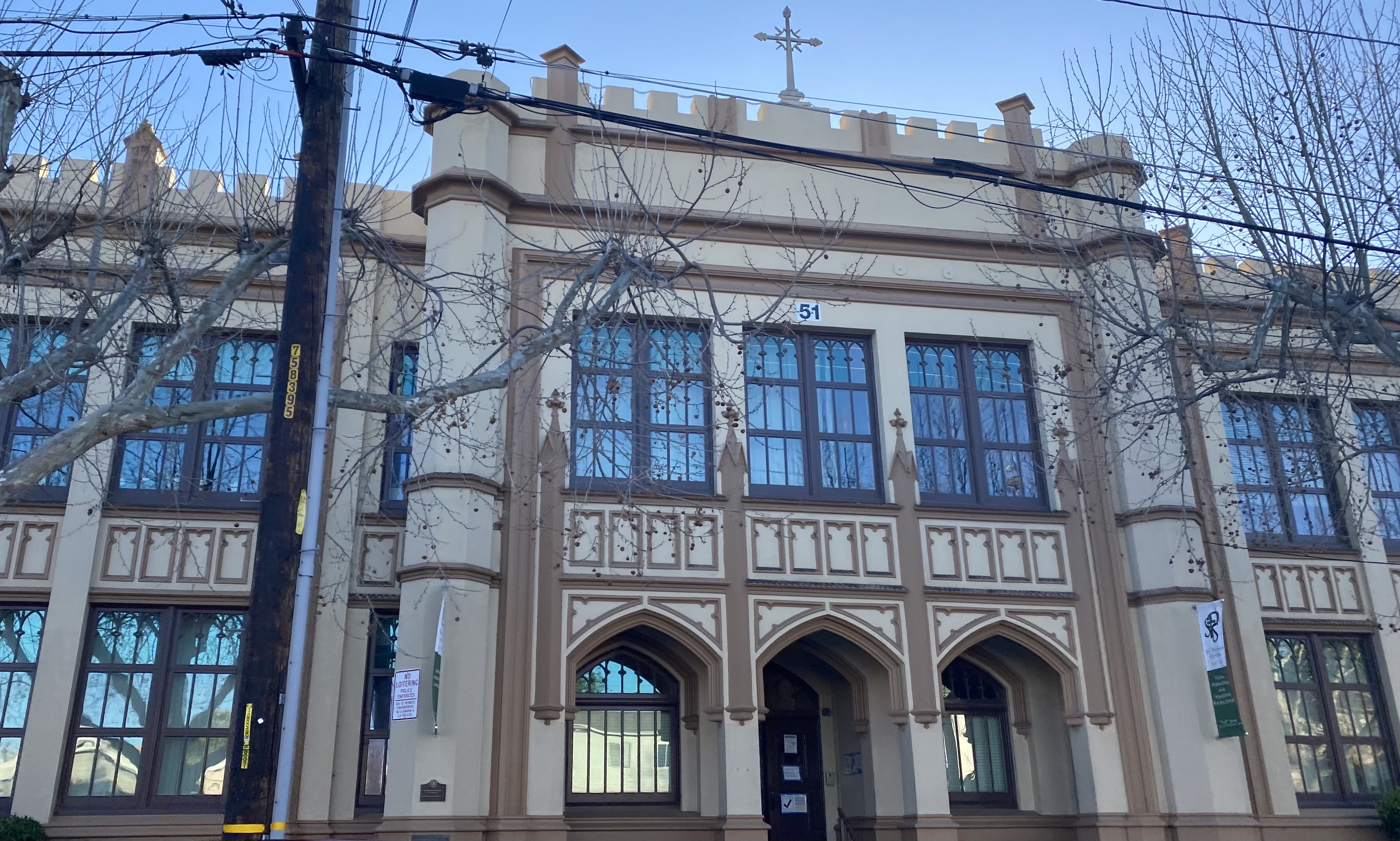

Location
- 1051 West San Fernando Street; San Jose, California 95126; United States; 37.3409°N 121.8832°W

Information
- Type: Private, coeducational
- Religious affiliation: Diocese of San Jose
- Established: 1925
- Principal: Lara de Guzman Ed.D.
- Grades: TK-8
- Campus type: Urban
- Athletics conference: Diocese of San Jose
- Website: stpatrickschool.org

Saint Patrick School is a private Catholic school (transitional kindergarten to eighth), located in San Jose, California. Founded in 1925, the school's historic gothic revival campus is located in Downtown San Jose, next to the Our Lady of La Vang Church, and designated as a city landmark.

== History ==
The school was founded in 1925, by the Sisters of the Presentation, through the patronage of prominent local figure Edward McLaughlin. The Sisters of the Presentation continued management of the school until 1985.

In 2004, the Daughters of Charity of Saint Vincent de Paul were selected by the Roman Catholic Diocese of San Jose in California to run the school.

== Notable alumni ==
- Viet Thanh Nguyen, Pulitzer Prize-winning journalist

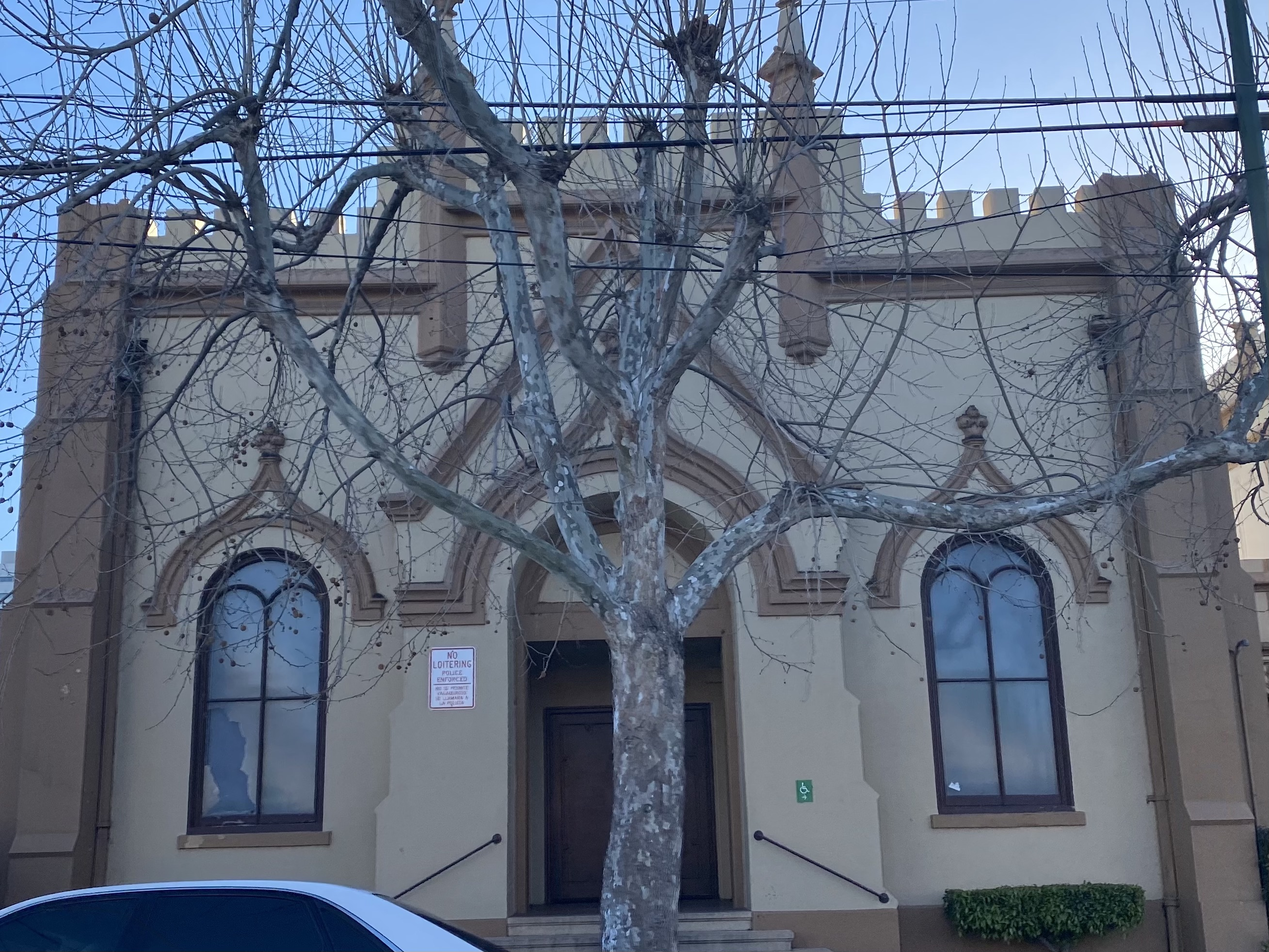
Saint Patrick School chapel
