= Judah and Funston station =

Muni Metro light rail stop in San Francisco

Judah and Funston
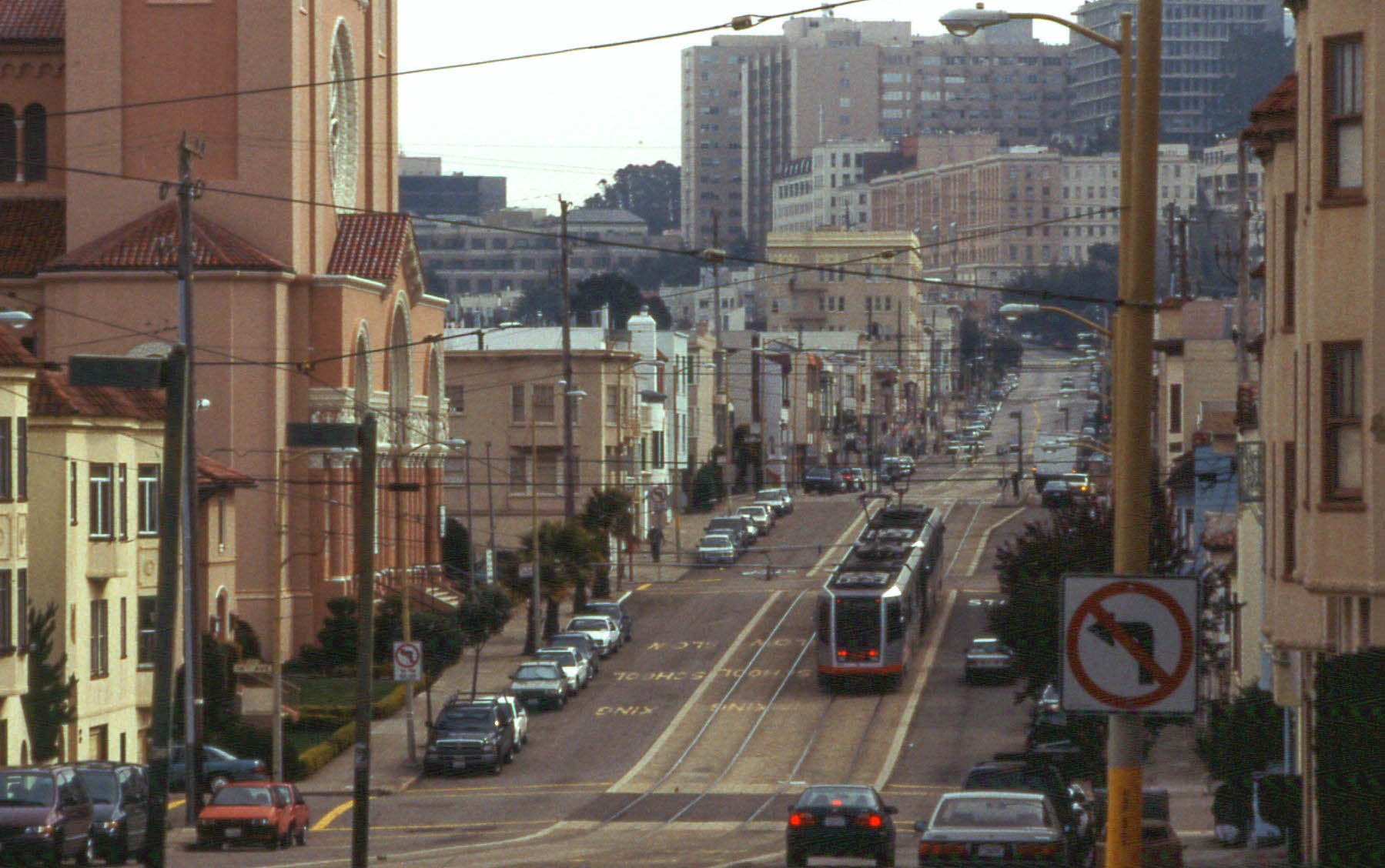
- A eastbound train at Funston Avenue in March 2001

General information
- Location: Judah Street at Funston Avenue; San Francisco, California
- Coordinates: 37°45′43″N 122°28′14″W
- Platforms: 2 side platforms
- Tracks: 2

Construction
- Accessible: No

History
- Opened: October 21, 1928
- Rebuilt: 1978

Services
Preceding station	Muni	Following station
Judah and 15th/16th Avenues toward Ocean Beach	N Judah	Judah and 12th Avenue toward 4th and King
Location

Judah and Funston station is a light rail stop on the Muni Metro N Judah line, located in the Sunset District neighborhood of San Francisco, California adjacent to the St. Anne of the Sunset Church. The station opened with the N Judah line on October 21, 1928. Judah and Funston has no platforms; trains stop at marked poles before the cross street, and passengers cross travel lanes to board. The station is not accessible to people with disabilities.

The stop is also served by the N Bus and N Owl bus routes, which provide service along the N Judah line during the early morning and late night hours respectively when trains do not operate.

In March 2014, Muni released details of the proposed implementation of their Transit Effectiveness Project (later rebranded MuniForward), which included a variety of stop changes for the N Judah line. Under that plan – which will be implemented as the N Judah Rapid Project – the stop at Funston Avenue would be closed because it is just one block away from the stop at 12th Avenue.
