= Saint Joseph of Cupertino School =

Location
- 10120 North De Anza Boulevard; Cupertino, California 95014; United States; 37°19′28″N 122°1′49″W

Information
- School type: Parochial school
- Motto: "A School, A Community, A Family"
- Religious affiliation: Roman Catholic
- Founded: 1962
- Founder: Msgr. Philip Ryan
- Grades: Pre-K - 8
- Mascot: Jerry the Jaguar
- Team name: Jaguars

Saint Joseph of Cupertino School is a parochial school located in Cupertino, California. It serves grades pre-k to 8. It is part of the Roman Catholic Diocese of San Jose in California.

The school is accredited by the Western Association of Schools and Colleges (WASC) and the Western Catholic Educational Association (WCEA).
