= Our Lady of La Vang Parish (San José) =

Cathedral in San Jose, California

Coordinates: 37°20′26″N 121°52′58″W

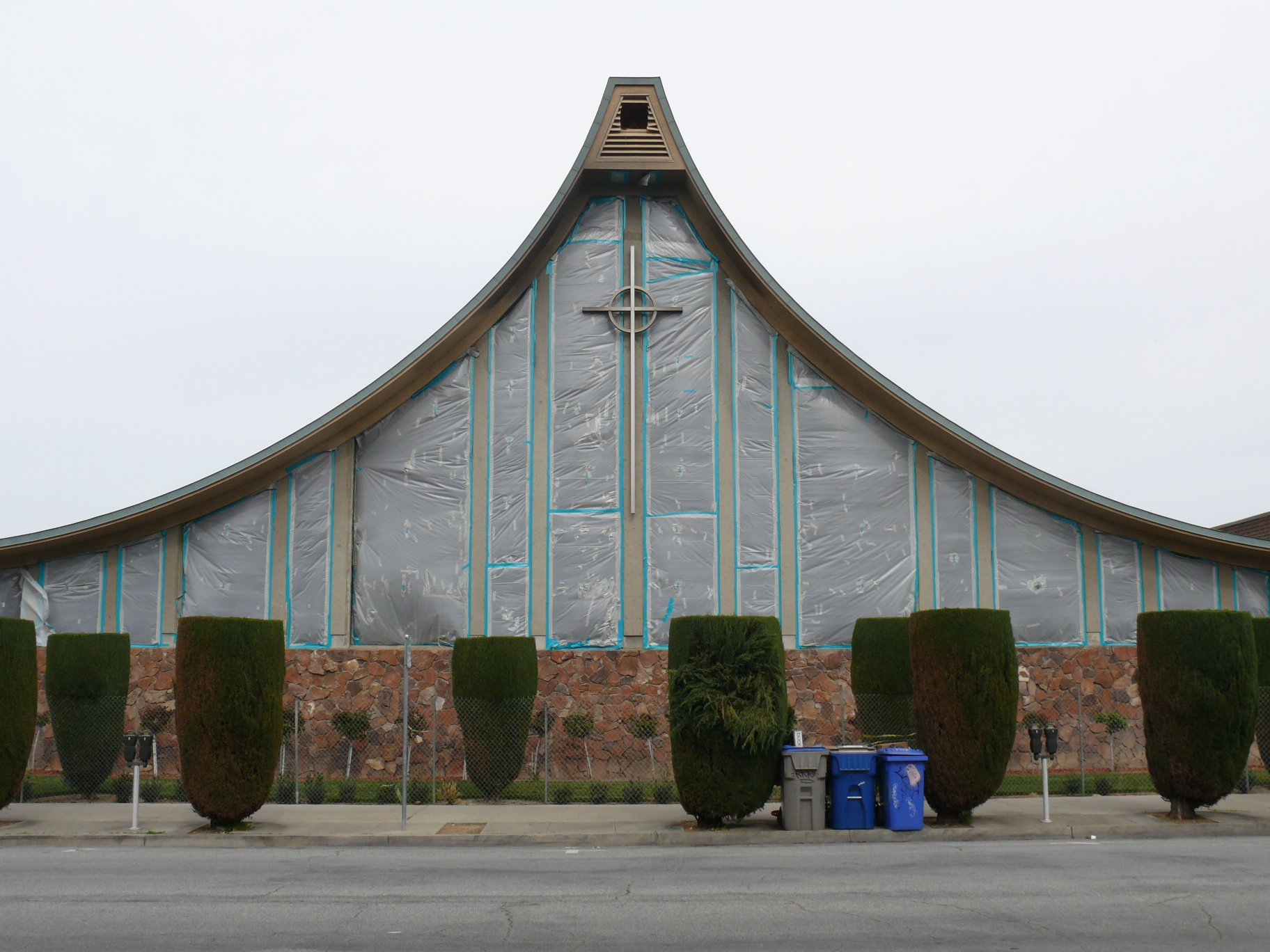
The proto-cathedral after the fire in 2012

Our Lady of La Vang Parish (Vietnamese: Giáo Xứ Đức Mẹ La Vang, Spanish: Iglesia Católica Nuestra Señora de La Vang), formerly Saint Patrick Proto-Cathedral Parish, is a Vietnamese national parish and former cathedral of the Roman Catholic Diocese of San Jose in California. The proto-cathedral is located in Downtown San José, one block north of San José State University. It is named after Our Lady of La Vang. The Daughters of Charity of Saint Vincent de Paul sponsor St. Patrick Elementary School which is located on the church grounds.

== History ==
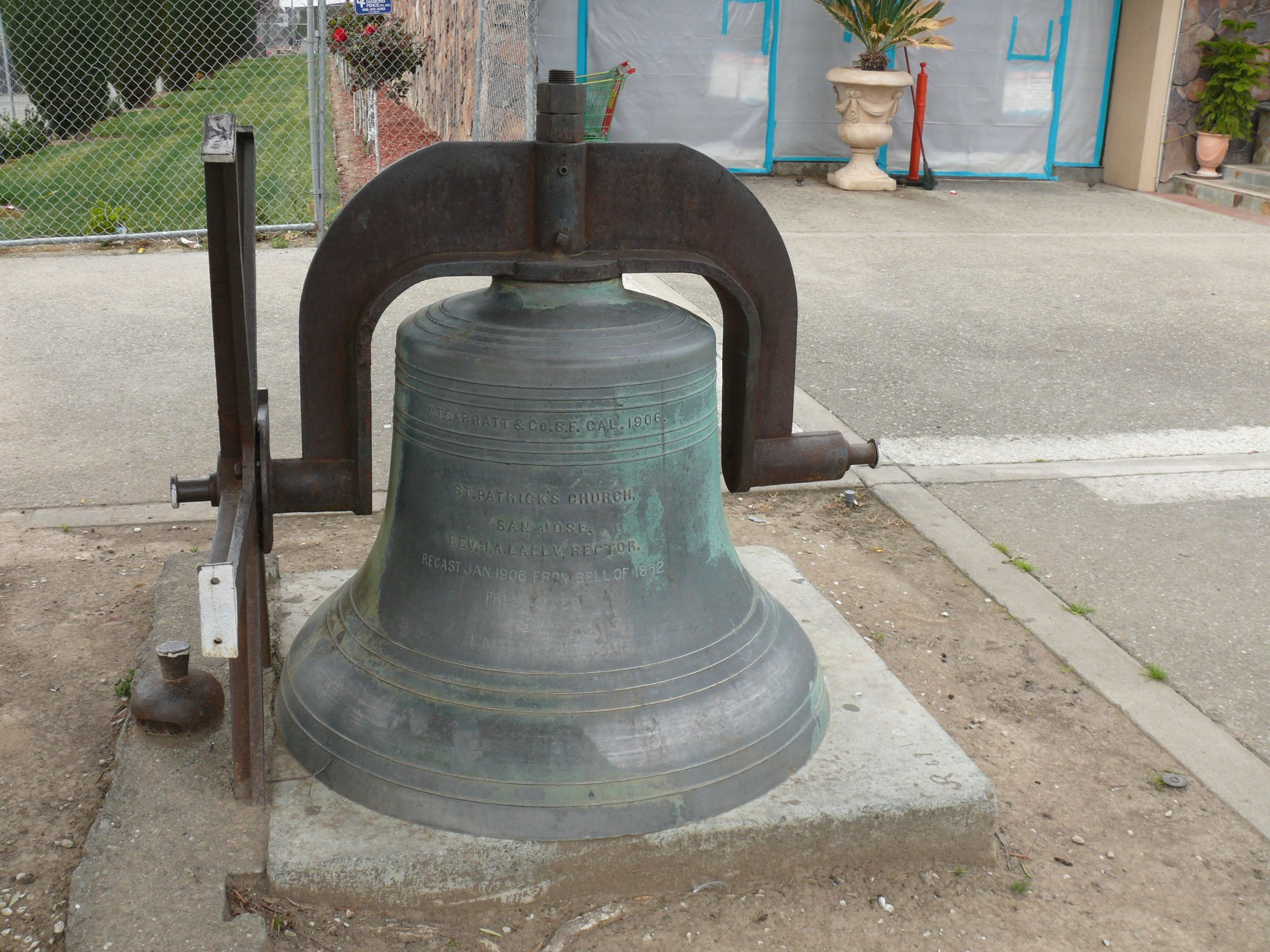
The bell of St. Patrick's Church, recast in 1906 from the original 1872 bell

Originally called St. Patrick, the parish was established in the city of San José, following what is now the Cathedral Basilica of St. Joseph. The parish was founded in 1872, with Father Joseph Gallagher serving as the first pastor. It was named for Patrick, Archbishop of Armagh and patron saint of Ireland.

The original parish church was a Gothic building at the intersection of Ninth and Santa Clara streets, which was completed in 1888. This church was destroyed in the 1906 San Francisco earthquake, but rebuilt less than a year later. The second church was replaced by the current church at the intersection of Eighth and Santa Clara streets in 1967. From 1981 until 1990, St. Patrick’s served as the cathedral of the Diocese of San José. The cathedra was then transferred to the newly renovated St. Joseph’s, at which time the parish was redesignated St. Patrick Proto-Cathedral Parish.

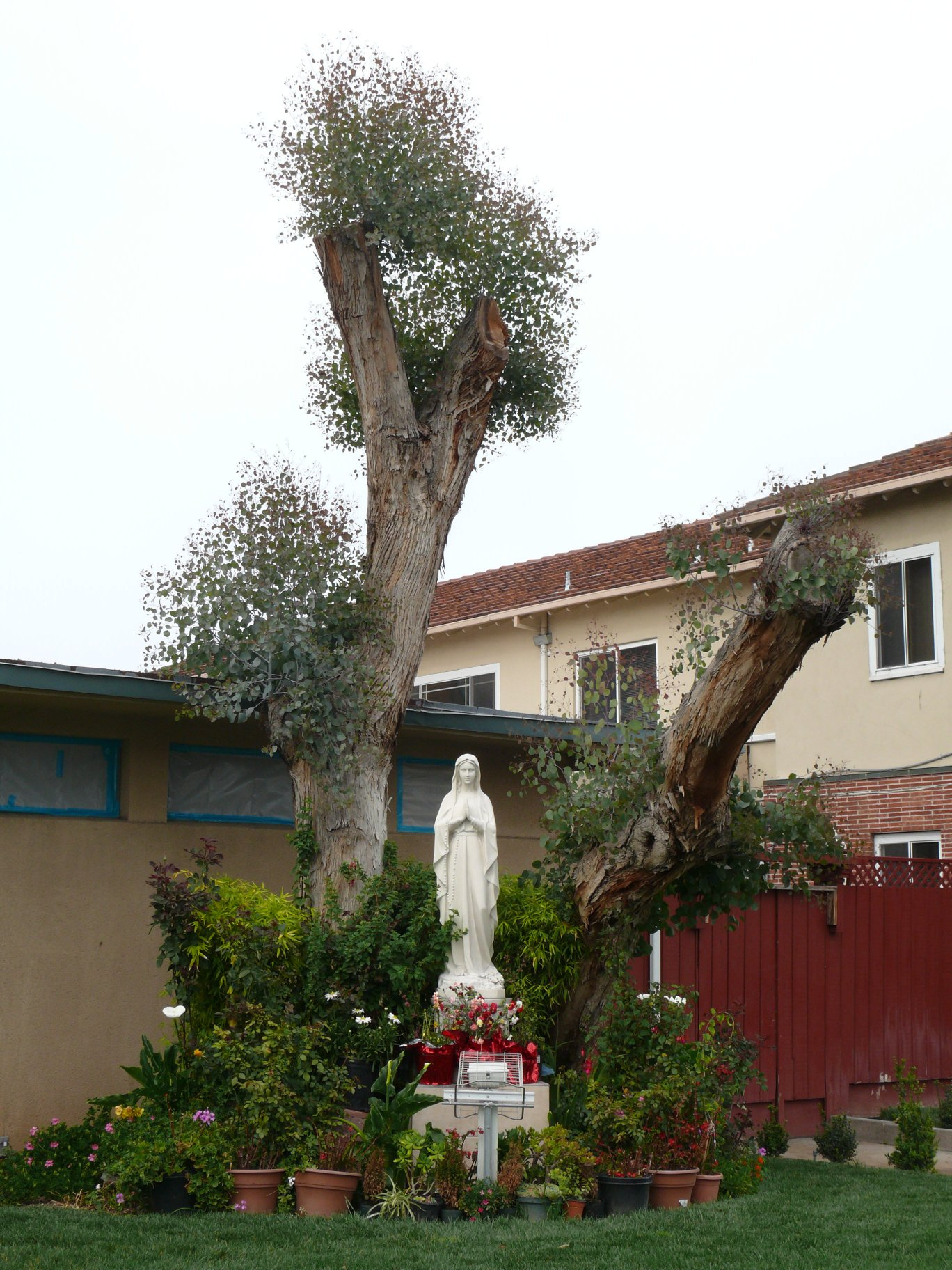
A statue of the Virgin Mary on the church grounds

In 2002, the parish changed from being a “regular” territorial parish to being a national parish for the Vietnamese population. In addition to the several services offered in Vietnamese, the parish also offers English and Spanish Masses.

The church building was destroyed by a fire on the morning of August 31, 2012, and demolished in 2017. On April 28, 2013, Bishop Patrick J. McGrath signed a decree renaming the proto-cathedral in honor of Our Lady of La Vang. The attached school remained St. Patrick School. The new church officially opened May 13, 2023.

== See also ==
- List of Catholic cathedrals in the United States
- List of cathedrals in the United States
