= Roman Catholic Diocese of Croae =

Catholic titular see in Albania

Diocese of Croae

Location
- Country: Albania
- Headquarters: Krujë

Information
- Denomination: Catholic
- Established: 13th Century
- Suppressed: 16th Century

Current leadership
- Bishop: Andres Cantoria Ligot

The Roman Catholic Diocese of Croae (Latin: Diœcesis Croënsis) is a titular see of the Roman Catholic Church. It used to consist of the city of Krujë in Albania.

== Bishops ==
- Titular Bishop Isidoro Aparici Gilart (Appointed 25 January 1694 - Died 1 January 1711)
- Titular Bishop Giovanni Battista di Mandello, O.F.M. Obs. (Appointed 14 February 1792 - Died 25 Jun 1804)
- Titular Bishop Andrea Canova, O.F.M. Cap. (Appointed 14 December 1847 - Died 10 August 1866)
- Titular Bishop Moise Amberbojan, C.M.V. (Appointed 27 February 1885 - Died 1898)
- Titular Bishop Giovanni Barcia (Appointed 24 April 1902 - Died 1912)
- Titular Bishop Antônio José dos Santos, C.M. (Appointed 13 December 1918 Appointed - Appointed Bishop of Assis, São Paulo, 22 November 1929)
- Titular Bishop Crisanto Luque y Sánchez (Appointed 16 January 1931 - Appointed Bishop of Tunja, 9 September 1932)
- Titular Bishop John Bernard MacGinley (Appointed 26 September 1932 - Died 18 October 1969)
- Titular Bishop Evelio Ramos Díaz (Appointed 26 October 1970 - Died 25 November 1976)
- Titular Bishop Edgardo Gabriel Storni (Appointed 4 January 1977 Appointed - Appointed Archbishop of Santa Fe, 28 August 1984)
- Titular Bishop Santiago García Aracil (Appointed 20 November 1984 - Appointed Bishop of Jaén, 31 May 1988)
- Titular Bishop Michel Malo, Ist. del Prado (Appointed 1 September 1988 - Appointed Bishop of Mahajanga, 29 March 1966)
- Titular Bishop Emilio Simeón Allué Carcasona, S.D.B. (Appointed 24 July 1996 - Died 26 April 2020)
- Titular Bishop Bruce Alan Lewandowski, C.Ss.R. (Appointed 10 June 2020 - 8 April 2025)
- Titular Bishop Andres Cantoria Ligot, J.C.D. (Appointed 29 August 2025 - )
