= Giovanni Barcia =

Roman Catholic bishop

Most Reverend Giovanni Barcia
- Ordinary for the Albanians of Calabria
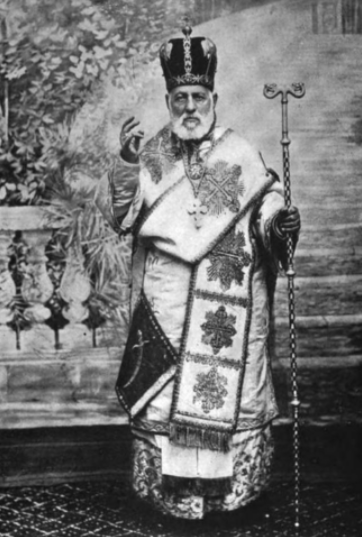
- Church: Italo-Albanian Catholic
- Diocese: Sicily
- See: Croae
- Appointed: 24 April 1902
- Predecessor: Giuseppe Schirò
- Successor: Giovanni Mele

Orders
- Consecration: 24 June 1902 by Vincenzo Vannutelli, Giustino Adami, and Wladyslaw Michal Zaleski

Personal details
- Born: 8 April 1829 Palazzo Adriano, Sicily, Italy
- Died: 2 December 1912 (age 83) San Demetrio Corone, Calabria, Italy
- Denomination: Italo-Albanian Catholic

Ordination history
History
Episcopal consecration
- Consecrated by: Vincenzo Vannutelli
Styles of Giovanni Barcia
- Spoken style: Your Excellency
- Religious style: Bishop

Giovanni Barcia (8 April 1829 – 2 December 1912) was the last Ordinary of the Italo-Albanian Catholic Church from 1902 until his death in 1912.

== Biography ==
Giovanni Barcia was born in Palazzo Adriano (PA) in 1829, during that time in the territory of the Latin diocese of Monreale.

On 24 April 1902, he was appointed to be the Bishop of the Italo-Albanian Catholic Church by Pope Leo XIII. Later, on 24 June 1902, Giovanni Barcia was consecrated as a bishop by Cardinal Vincenzo Vannutelli with co-consecrators Archbishop Giustino Adami and the future Latin Patriarch of Antioch Wladyslaw Michal Zaleski. Pope Leo XIII gave him the titular see of Croae and Giovanni went on to lead the Italo-Albanian Catholic Church for ten years.

Giovanni Barcia resided in Naples and was also the superior of the College of San Adriano in San Demetrio Corone (CS), Calabria. Bishop Giovanni Barcia was also the president of the Italian Clergy Committee for the relief of those affected by the Calabria earthquake.
