= Church of the Nativity (Menlo Park, California) =

Historic church in California, United States

- U.S. National Register of Historic Places
- California Historical Landmark
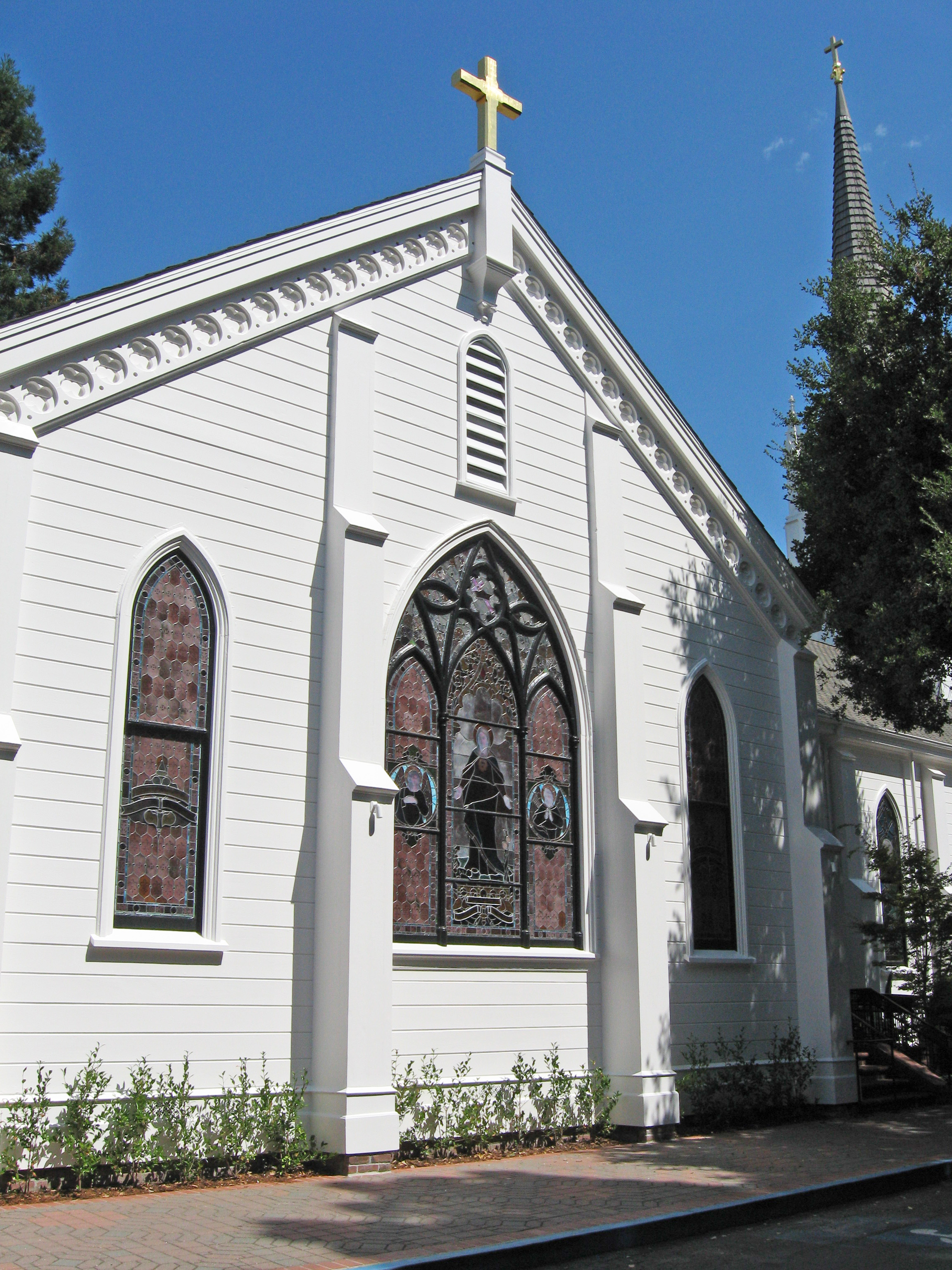

- Location within San Francisco Bay Area Location within California Location within the United States
- Location: 210 Oak Grove Avenue, Menlo Park, California
- Coordinates: 37°27′39″N 122°10′48″W
- Area: 1.7 acres (0.69 ha)
- Built: 1872
- Architect: James Doyle
- Architectural style: Gothic Revival
- NRHP reference No.: 80000855
- CHISL No.: P197

Significant dates
- Added to NRHP: October 31, 1980
- Designated CHISL: May 19, 1971

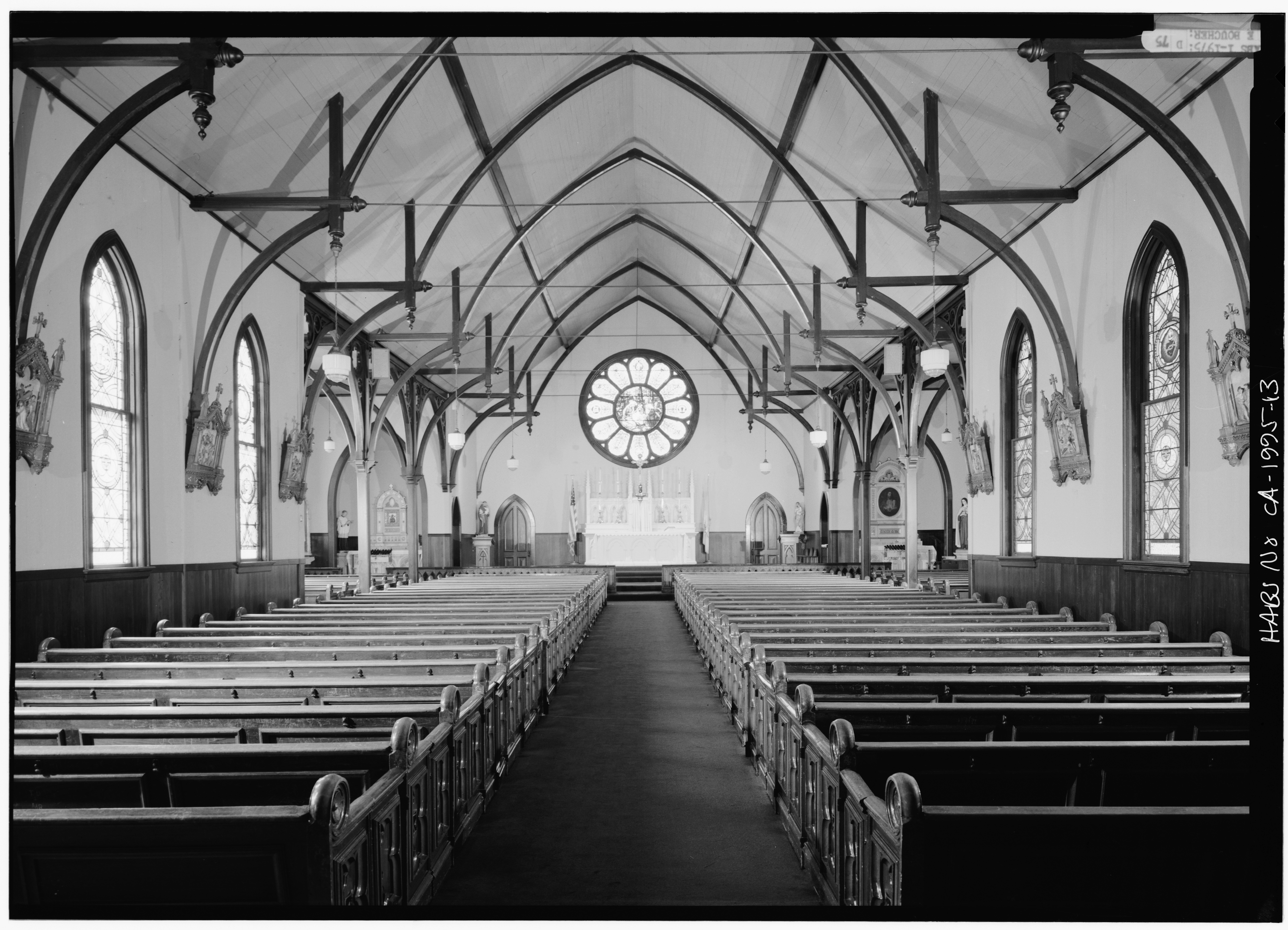
Church interior

Church of the Nativity is a historic Roman Catholic church on the National Register of Historic Places in Menlo Park, California. It was built in 1887 and added to the National Register in 1980.

== History ==
The church was constructed in 1872 and was moved on log rollers twice before arriving at its current location in 1877. This earned it the nickname of the "Roaming Catholic Church."

In 1996 the church adopted the tradition of Perpetual Adoration, with members of the church volunteering to pray continuously in an uninterrupted chain, and has continued for over 20 years.

The current pastor at the Church of the Nativity is the Rev. Msgr. Steven D. Otellini, brother to past Intel CEO Paul Otellini, and, because of the church's proximity to Saint Patrick's Seminary and University in Menlo Park, weekend assistants often include young or international priests. Nearby are the Vallombrosa Center retreat house and the Corpus Christi Monastery of Dominican sisters. The parish serves a predominantly Anglo Catholic community and has an associated parochial school, Nativity School. With a relatively strong academic reputation locally, students from Nativity School have gone on to such local high schools as Sacred Heart Preparatory (Atherton, California), Santa Catalina School (Monterey, California) Saint Francis High School (Mountain View), Mercy High School (Burlingame, California), Bellarmine College Preparatory, and Notre Dame High School (Belmont, California) as well as colleges including Stanford University, Loyola Marymount University, California Polytechnic State University, New York University, University of California, Berkeley, University of California, Davis, and Saint Mary's College of California among others.
