= Pierre DuMaine =

American Roman Catholic bishop (1931–2019)

His Excellency, The Most Reverend Roland Pierre DuMaine
- Bishop of San Jose
- See: Roman Catholic Diocese of San Jose in California
- Appointed: January 27, 1981
- Installed: March 18, 1981
- Term ended: November 27, 1999
- Successor: Patrick Joseph McGrath
- Previous posts: Auxiliary Bishop of San Francisco; 1978 to 1981

Orders
- Ordination: June 15, 1957
- Consecration: June 29, 1978 by John R. Quinn, Joseph Thomas McGucken, and William Joseph McDonald

Personal details
- Born: August 2, 1931 Paducah, Kentucky, US
- Died: June 13, 2019 (aged 87) Sunnyvale, California, US
- Denomination: Roman Catholic
- Education: Catholic University of America; Saint Patrick's Seminary, Menlo Park
- Motto: Gaudium et spes (Joy and hope)
- Coat of arms

Styles of Roland Pierre DuMaine
- Reference style: His Excellency; The Most Reverend
- Spoken style: Your Excellency
- Religious style: Bishop

Roland Pierre DuMaine (August 2, 1931 – June 13, 2019) was an American Catholic prelate who served as the first Bishop of San José in California from 1981 to 1999. He also served as an auxiliary bishop for the Archdiocese of San Francisco from 1978 to 1981.

== Biography ==
=== Early life ===
DuMaine was born in Paducah, Kentucky, on August 2, 1931. DuMaine attended St. Joseph College in Mountain View, California and Saint Patrick's Seminary in Menlo Park, California.

=== Priesthood ===
DuMaine was ordained a priest of the Archdiocese of San Francisco at the Cathedral of St. Mary of the Assumption in San Francisco on June 15, 1957, by Bishop Hugh Aloysius Donohoe. DuMaine earned his Doctor of Education degree at the Catholic University of America in Washington, D.C., in 1961, where he served as assistant professor until 1963.

From 1963 through 1965, DuMaine taught at Junípero Serra High School in San Mateo. He then served as assistant superintendent and superintendent of schools for the archdioceses from 1965 to 1978. He was named prelate of honor by the Vatican on July 18, 1972.

=== Auxiliary Bishop of San Francisco ===
DuMaine was named an auxiliary bishop of San Francisco by Pope Paul VI on April 24, 1978. He was consecrated at the Cathedral of St. Mary of the Assumption in San Francisco, California on June 29, 1978, by Archbishop John Raphael Quinn. He was the founding director of Catholic Television Network in Menlo Park from 1978 to 1981.

=== Bishop of San Jose ===
On January 27, 1981, DuMaine was named by Pope John Paul II the first bishop of the Diocese of San Jose, where he was installed on March 18, 1981.

=== Retirement and legacy ===
DuMaine's request to retire as bishop of San Jose was accepted by John Paul II on November 27, 1999.

After his retirement, DuMaine remained active in national Bishops' Committees for Science and Human Values and for Women in Society and the Church. He participated in dialogues and conferences on science and religion, and taught in the Religious Studies departments of Stanford University and Santa Clara University. Santa Clara appointed him presidential professor of catholic theology.

DuMaine died on June 13, 2019, in Sunnyvale, California at age 87.

== Episcopal succession ==
Religious titles
| Preceded by First Bishop | Bishop of San Jose; 1981–1998 | Succeeded by Patrick Joseph McGrath |
| Preceded by — | Auxiliary Bishop of San Francisco; 1978–1981 | Succeeded by — |
