= Cathedral Basilica of St. Joseph (San Jose, California) =

Historic church in California, United States

Cathedral Basilica of Saint Joseph
- Spanish: Catedral Basílica de San José
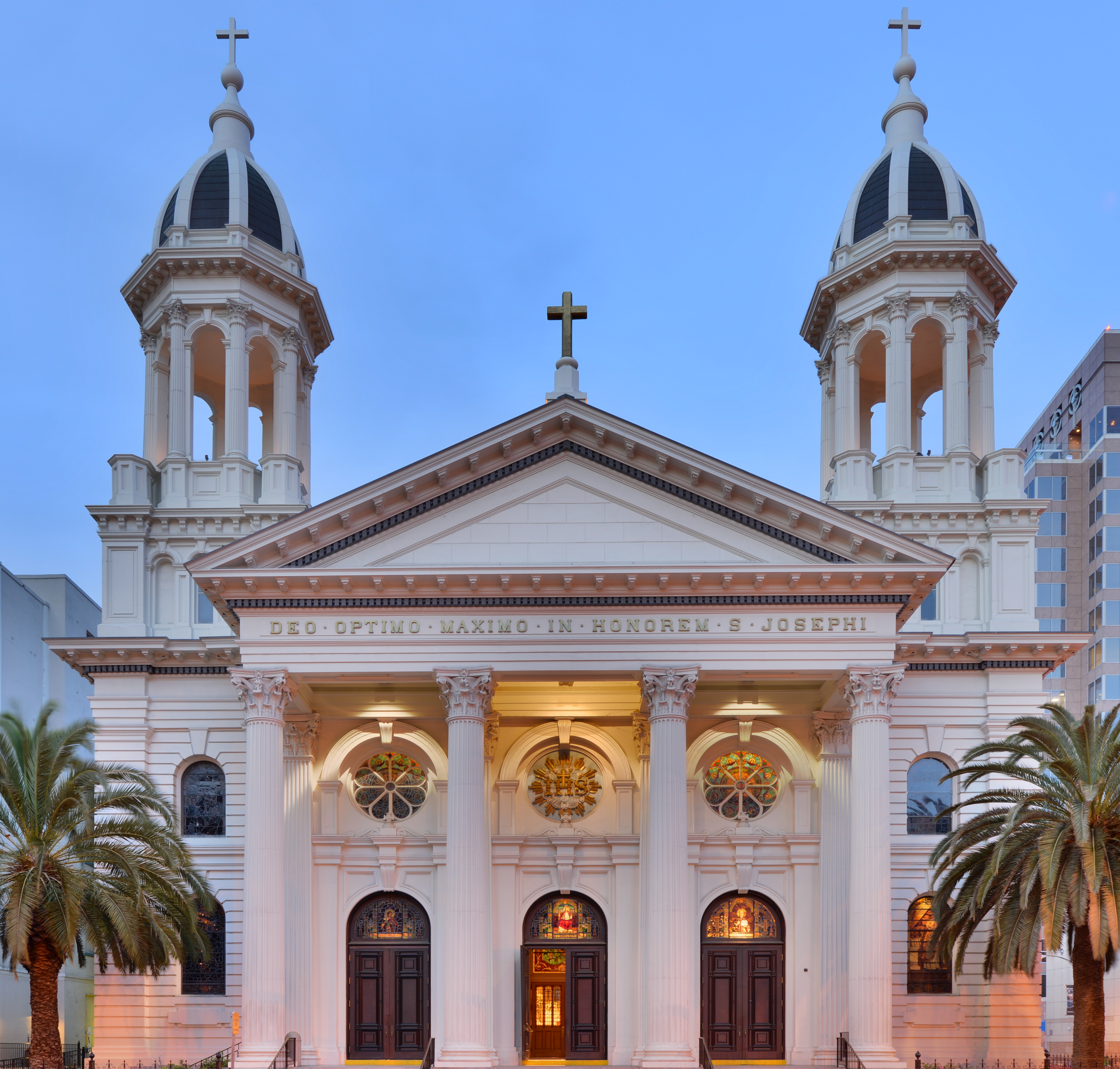
- Cathedral Basilica of St. Joseph

- Location within San Jose, California
- 37°20′03″N 121°53′27″W
- Location: 80 South Market Street; San Jose, California
- Country: United States
- Denomination: Roman Catholic
- Website: www.stjosephcathedral.org

History
- Status: Minor Basilica, Cathedral
- Founded: April 22, 1877
- Dedication: Saint Joseph
- Dedicated: 1990
- Consecrated: 1803, 1877

Architecture
- Functional status: Active
- Groundbreaking: 1876
- Completed: 1885

Specifications
- Capacity: 950

Administration
- Province: Ecclesiastical province of San Francisco
- Archdiocese: Archidioecesis Sancti Francisci
- Diocese: Dioecesis Sancti Josephi in California
- Deanery: Deanery 3

Clergy
- Bishop: Oscar Cantú
- Vicars: Rev. Fr. Gerardo Menchaca; Rev. Fr. Tadeusz Terembula
- Dean: Rev. Fr. Ritche Bueza (St. John the Baptist Parish)
- Pastor: Rev. Fr. Joseph M. Benedict
- St. Joseph's Roman Catholic Church
- U.S. National Register of Historic Places
- California Historical Landmark
- Location within California Location within the United States
- Location: Market and San Fernando Sts., San Jose, California
- Coordinates: 37°20′03″N 121°53′22″W
- Area: 0.6 acres (0.24 ha)
- Built: 1875
- Architect: Clinch,Bryan
- Architectural style: Greek Revival
- NRHP reference No.: 77000345
- CHISL No.: 910

Significant dates
- Added to NRHP: August 26, 1977
- Designated CHISL: May 12, 1977

The Cathedral Basilica of St. Joseph (Spanish: Catedral Basílica de San José) is a historic Catholic church in Downtown San Jose that serves as the cathedral for the Diocese of San José in California, with the distinction of minor basilica.

The basilica is named for Saint Joseph, patron saint of the Catholic Church and the namesake of San Jose, California.

== History ==
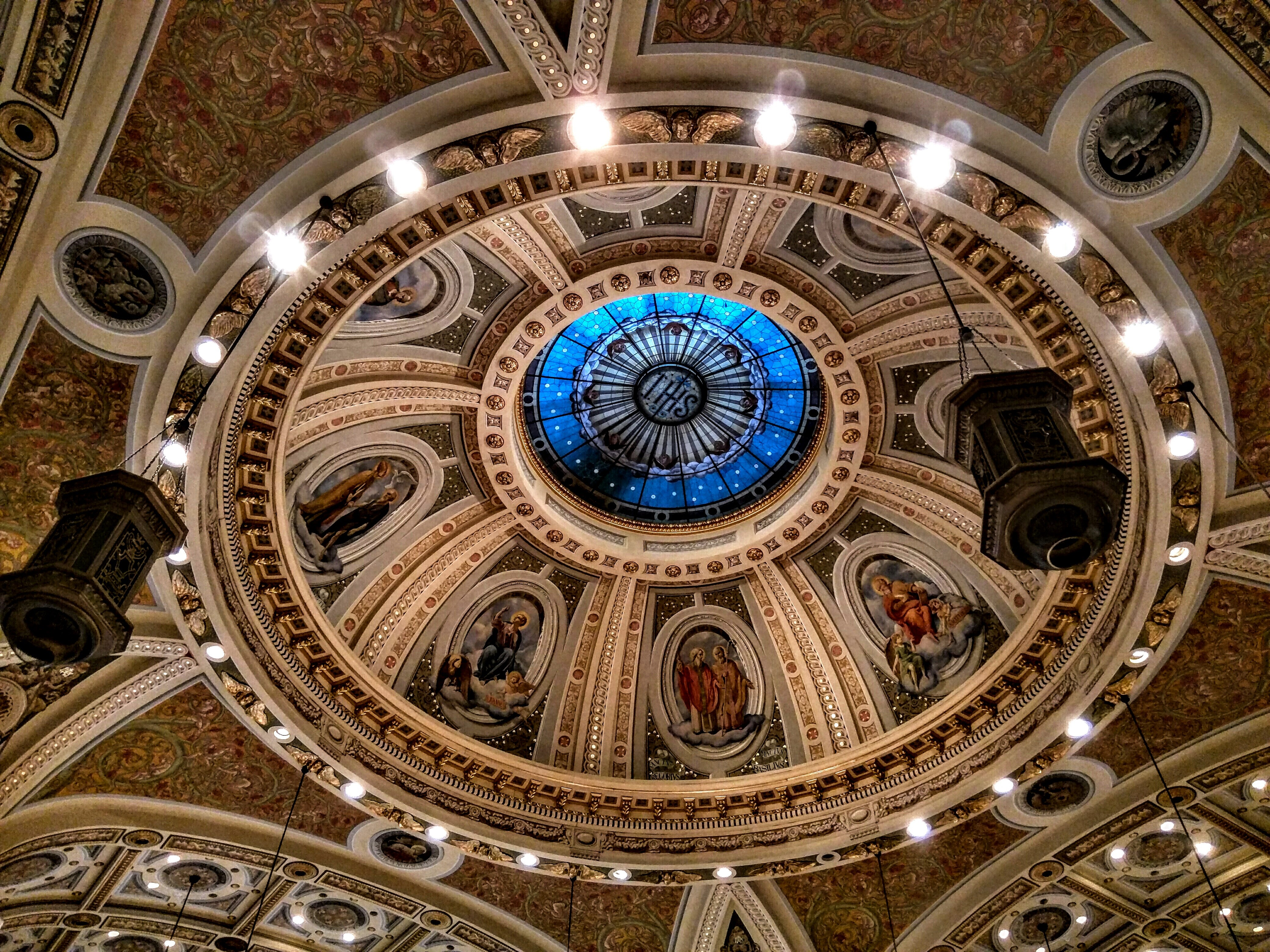
Detail of the dome

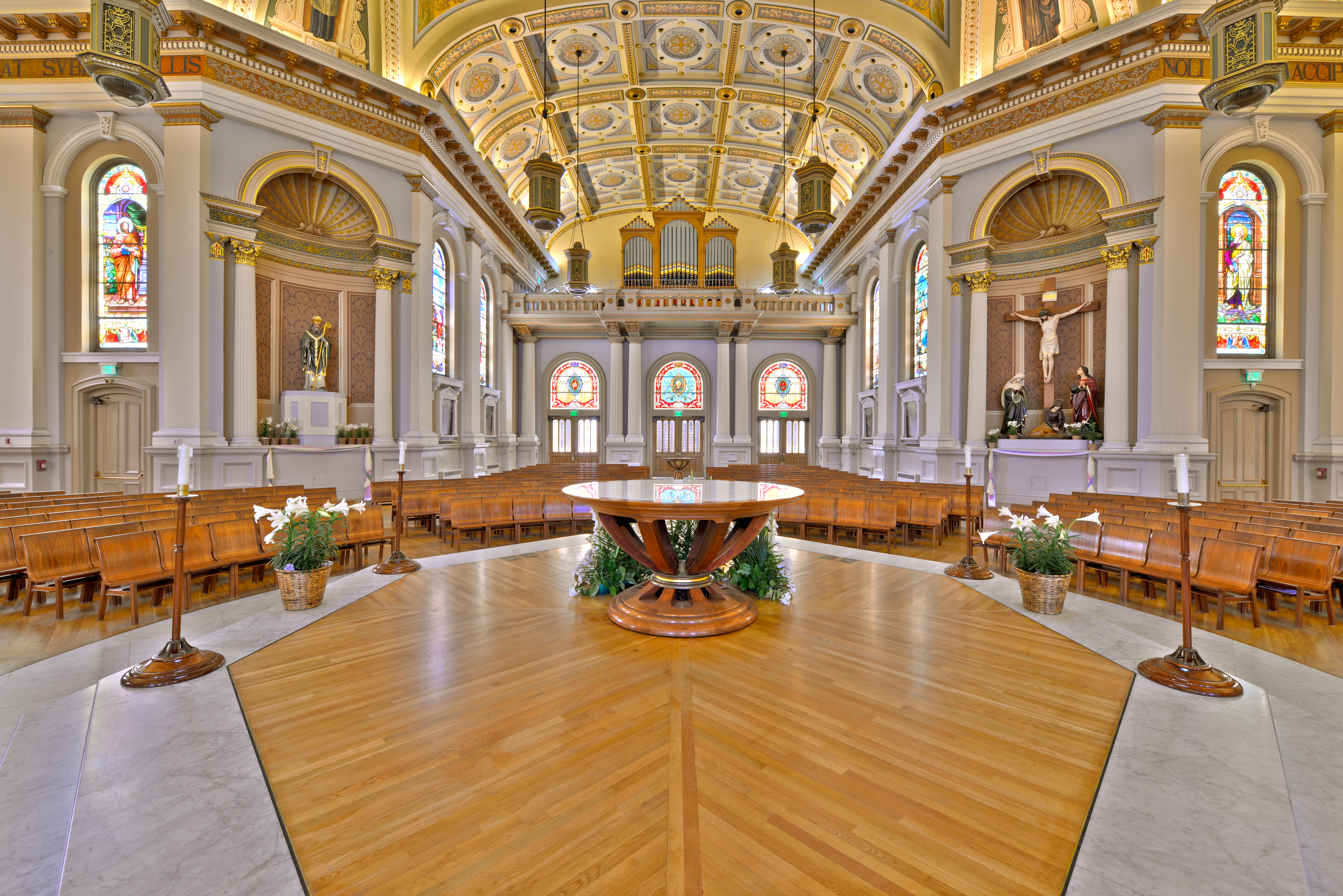
View from the altar

The original St. Joseph's Church was called San Jose de Guadalupe built on the site of the current basilica in 1803, and was the first non-mission parish built in California for the benefit of Spanish settlers instead of the Mission Indians (Ohlone). The Pueblo de San Jose de Guadalupe was connected with Mission Santa Clara by The Alameda which was part of the historic El Camino Real. The original adobe structure was damaged by earthquakes in 1818 and 1822.

In 1835, prominent Californio businessman Antonio Suñol donated the land at the northeast corner of the Plaza del Pueblo (modern Plaza de César Chávez) for the construction of a new, larger adobe church. Suñol, alongside his brother-in-law Antonio María Pico (who served as Alcalde of San José at the time), oversaw the construction of the church for the next eight years until its completion and consecration in 1846. In 1842, Suñol petitioned Francisco García Diego y Moreno, the Bishop of the Californias, for proper religious vestments and relics for the church. The second church was severely damaged by the 1868 Hayward earthquake.

Work on the third church began in 1869. The third church was destroyed by fire in 1875, and a temporary fourth church was built a few blocks away while the fifth and current church was being constructed. The fifth church was dedicated by Joseph Alemany, Archbishop of San Francisco, in 1877 while construction continued. The current portico was completed in 1884, and the large dome was finished in 1885.

In 1981, a major renovation project was begun at the church, which was to become the cathedral for the new Roman Catholic Bishop of San Jose. In 1985, the church was elevated to a cathedral, pending completion of the restoration in 1990. It replaced Saint Patrick Proto-Cathedral Parish, located a few blocks away, as the cathedral of the diocese. The cathedral was made a minor basilica by Pope John Paul II in 1997.

The Cathedral Basilica of St. Joseph is listed as a California Historical Landmark and is listed on the National Register of Historic Places.

== Architecture ==
=== Plaques at entrance ===
Just inside the entrance to the cathedral are two plaques that read:

The Most Rev. Joseph S. Alemany, O.P.
First Archbishop of San Francisco
dedicated Saint Joseph Church,
fourth on this site, on land
donated by Antonio Sunol for the
first permanent Catholic Parish
in California, founded in 1803.

— Rev. Nicholas Congiato, S.J., Pastor, 22 April 1877

The Most Rev. R. Pierre DuMaine
First Bishop of San Jose
dedicated this Church
restored and renovated
as the new Cathedral
of the Diocese of San Jose.

— Rev. P. Jeremiah Helfrich, S.J. Rector, 4 November 1990

=== Joseph bible quotes ===
The top of the walls of the inside of the cathedral include quotes from the Vulgate about Joseph:

- Matthew 1:20 - ANGELVS DOMINI APPARVIT IN SOMNIS JOSEPH NOLI TIMERE ACCIPERE MARIAM CONIVGEM TVAM
- Matthew 1:24 - EXSVRGENS JOSEPH A SOMNO FECIT SICVT PRÆCEPIT ET ANGELVS DOMINI ET ACCEPIT CONIVGEN SVAM
- Matthew 2:13–2:14 - FVTVRVM EST VT HERODES QVÆRAT PVERVM AD PEDENDVM ET MATREM EIVS NOCTE ET SECESSIT IN ÆGYPTVM
- Luke 2:48 - DIXIT MATER EIVS ECCE PATER TVVS ET EGO DOLENTES QVÆREBVS TE
- Luke 2:51 - DESCENDIT CVM EIS ET VENIT NAZARET ET ERAT SVBDITVS ILLIS
- Luke 3:23 - ET JESVS PVTABATVR FILIVS JOSEPH

=== Stained glass windows ===
The stained glass windows going counter clockwise from the east transept depict:

1. Agony in the Garden
2. Crucifixion
3. Saint Aloysius Gonzaga
4. Saint Catherine of Alexandria
5. Saint Patrick
6. Saint John
7. Saint Luke
8. The Holy Family
9. Saint Casimir
10. Saint Edward the Confessor
11. Saint John the Baptist
12. Saint Mark
13. Saint Matthew
14. Saint Margaret Mary Alacoque & The Sacred Heart of Jesus
15. Saint Francis Xavier
16. Saint Claude de la Colombière
17. Resurrection
18. Ascension

=== Odell pipe organ ===
The Odell pipe organ was built in 1886 by the J. H. and C. S. Odell Company in Yonkers, New York. It is the only such Odell instrument surviving in its original condition in the United States. It has 40,000 parts. It has 27 ranks of 60 pipes each. It was restored in 1987–90.

== Gallery ==
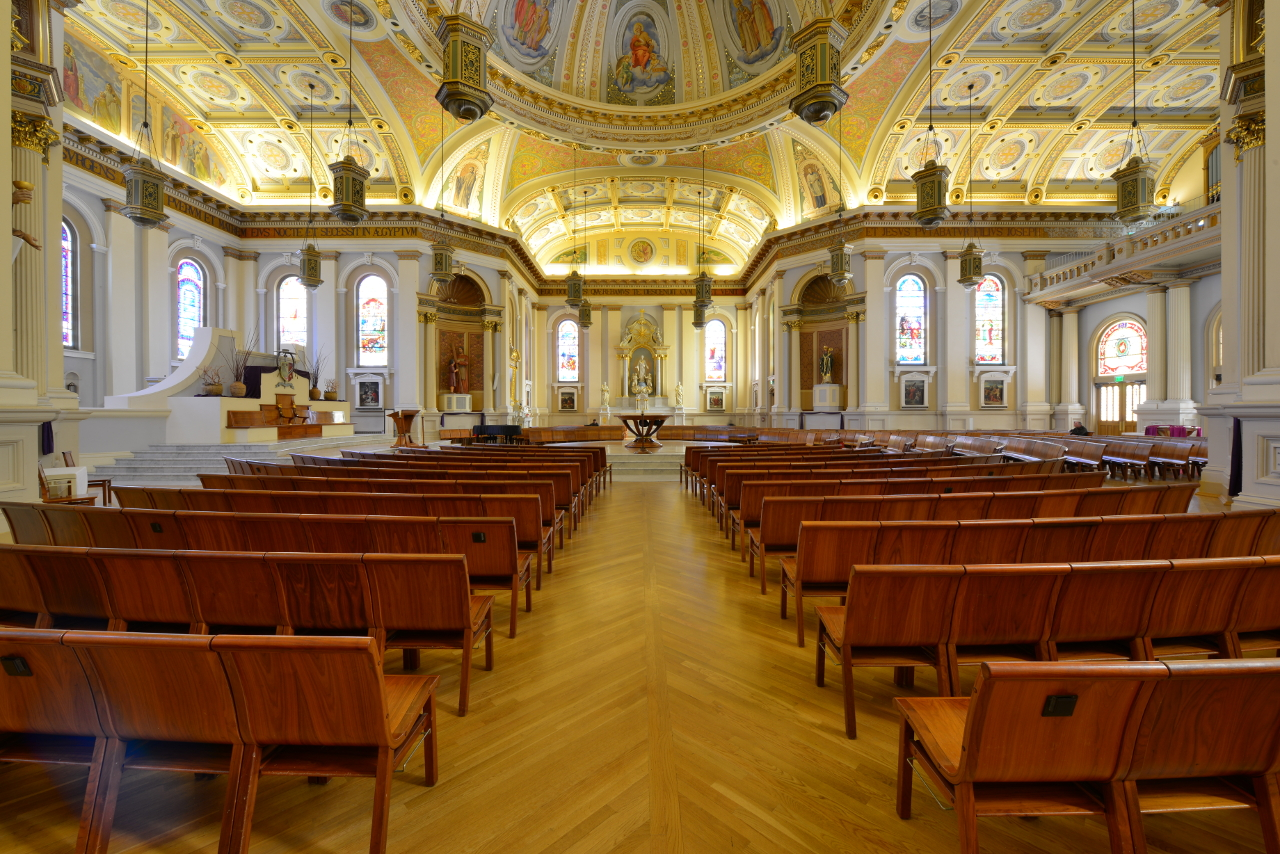
From the baptismal font, looking up the nave to the altar.

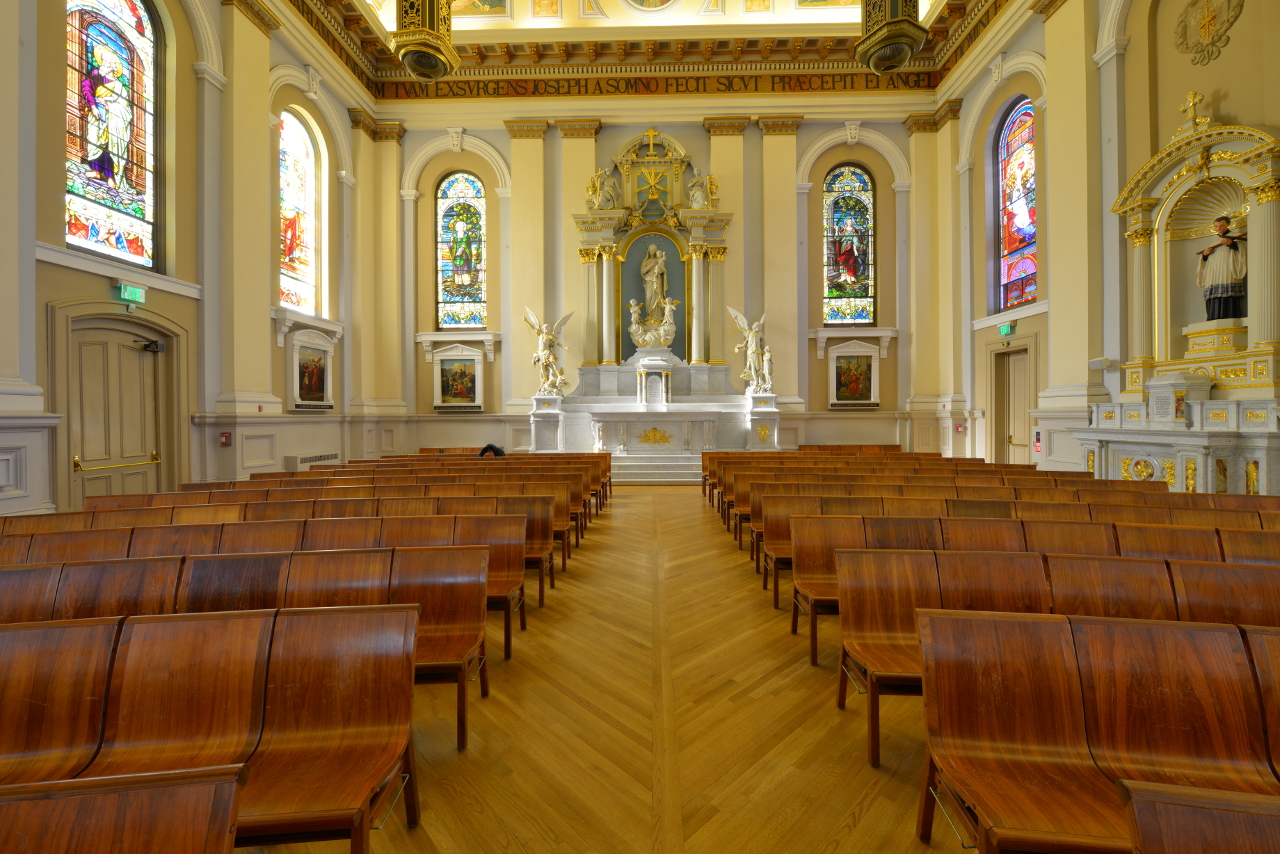
The south semitransept, from the altar

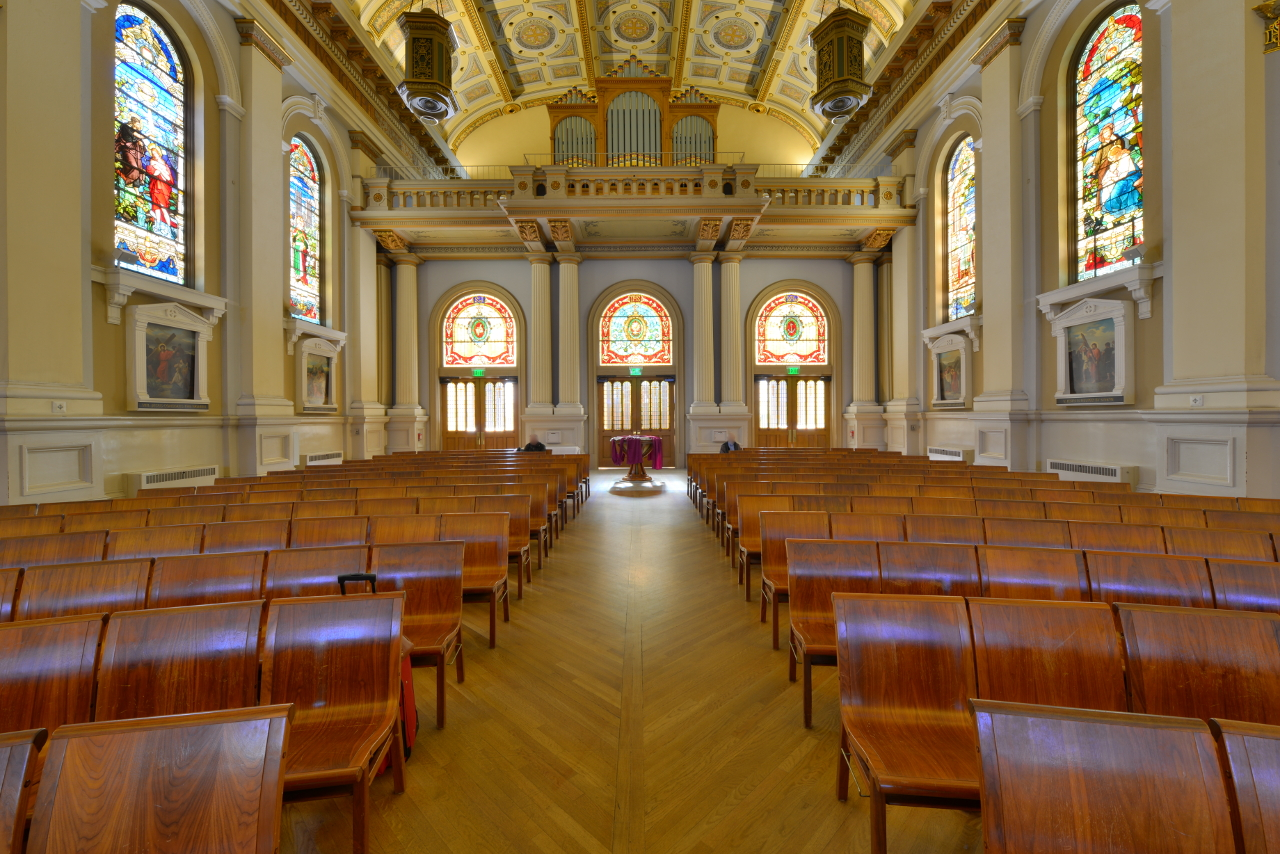
The nave from the altar, showing the baptismal font, with organ loft above

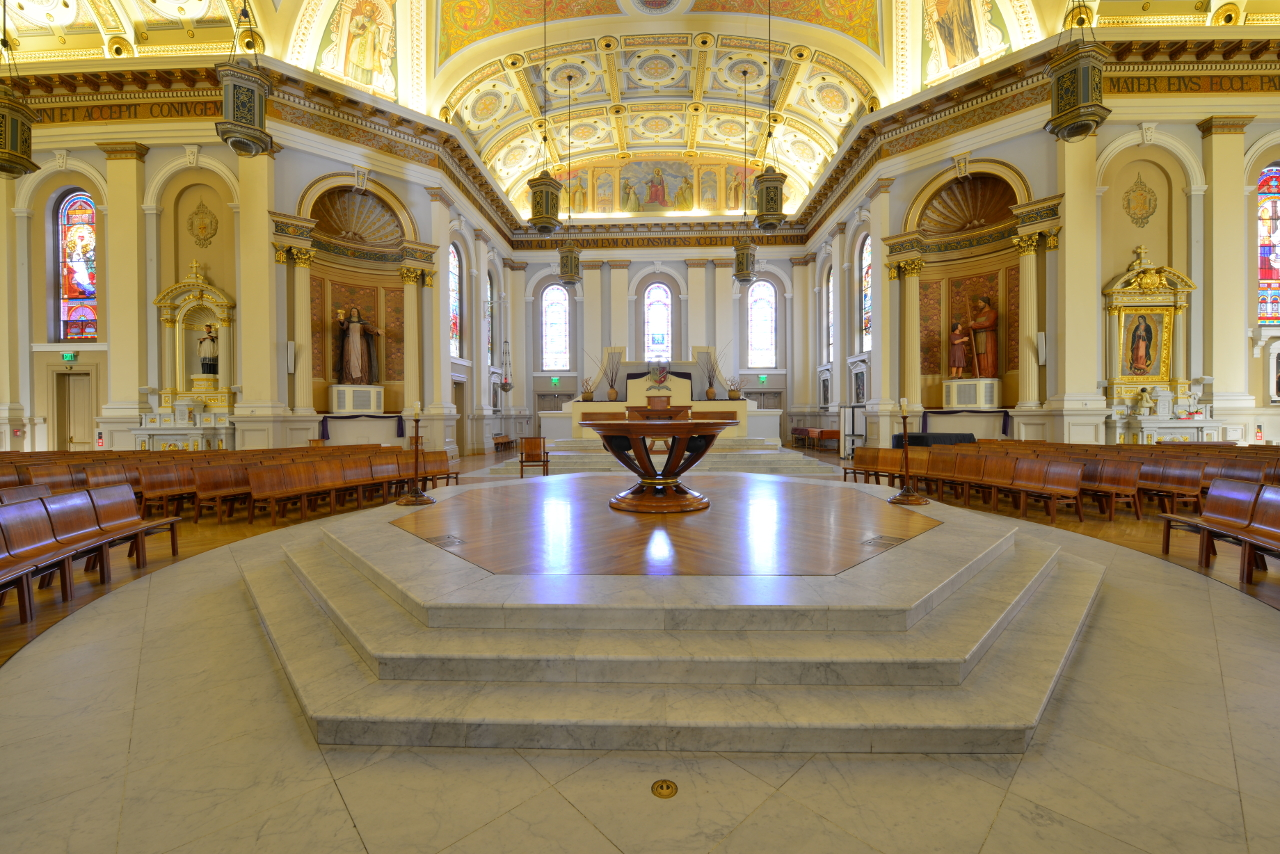
The altar from the top of the nave with the ambo and cathedra behind it

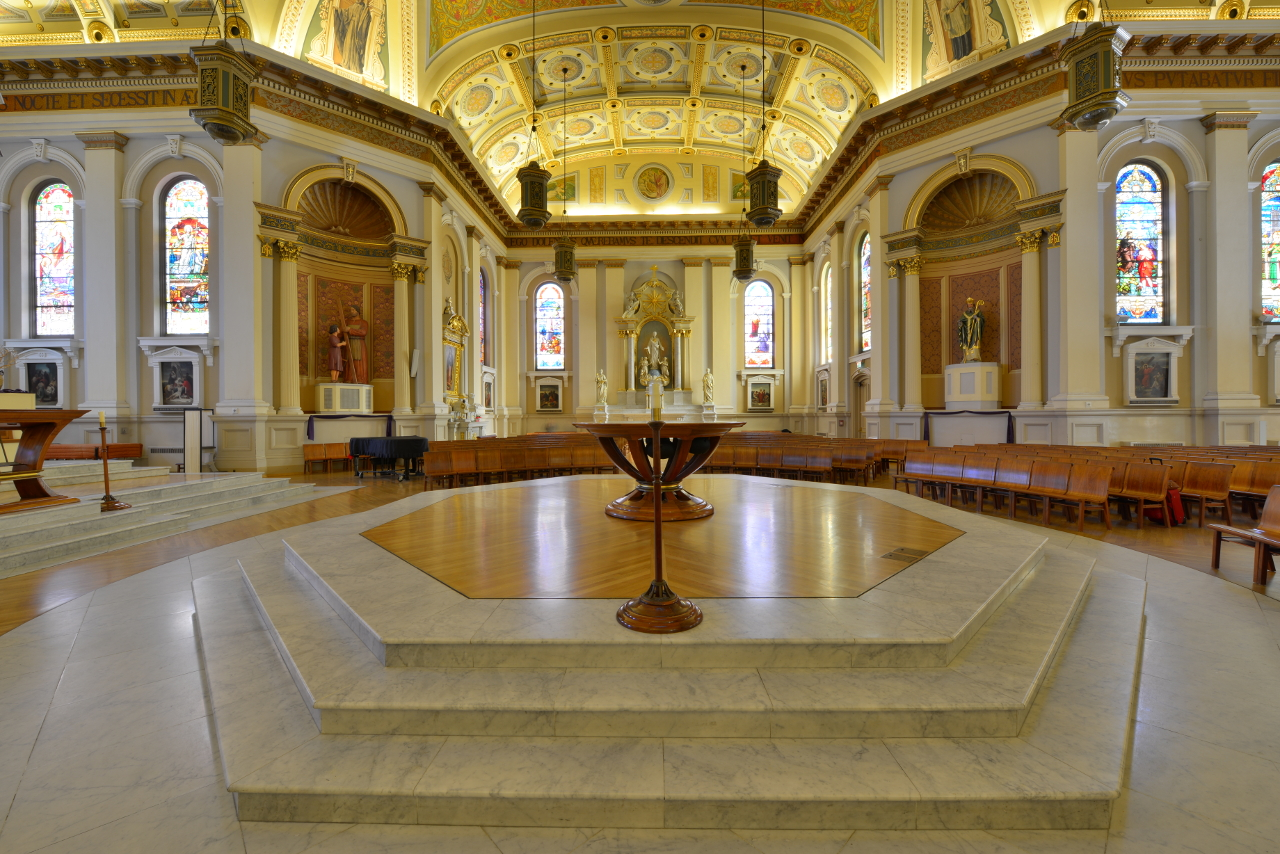
The altar, from the north semitransept

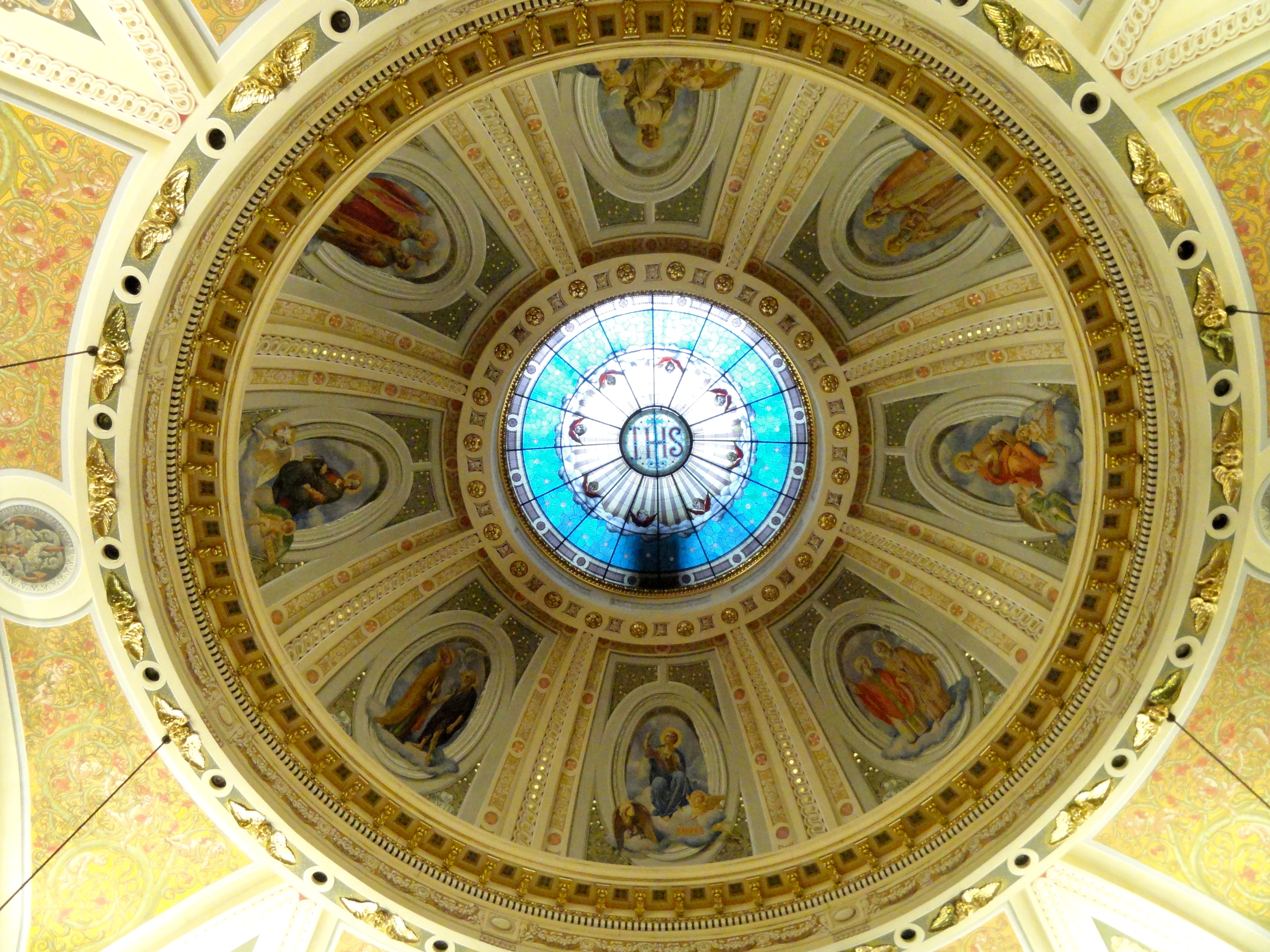
Interior of the large dome over the crossing

== See also ==
- List of Catholic cathedrals in the United States
- List of cathedrals in the United States
