= St. Anne of the Sunset Church in San Francisco =

St. Anne of the Sunset Church
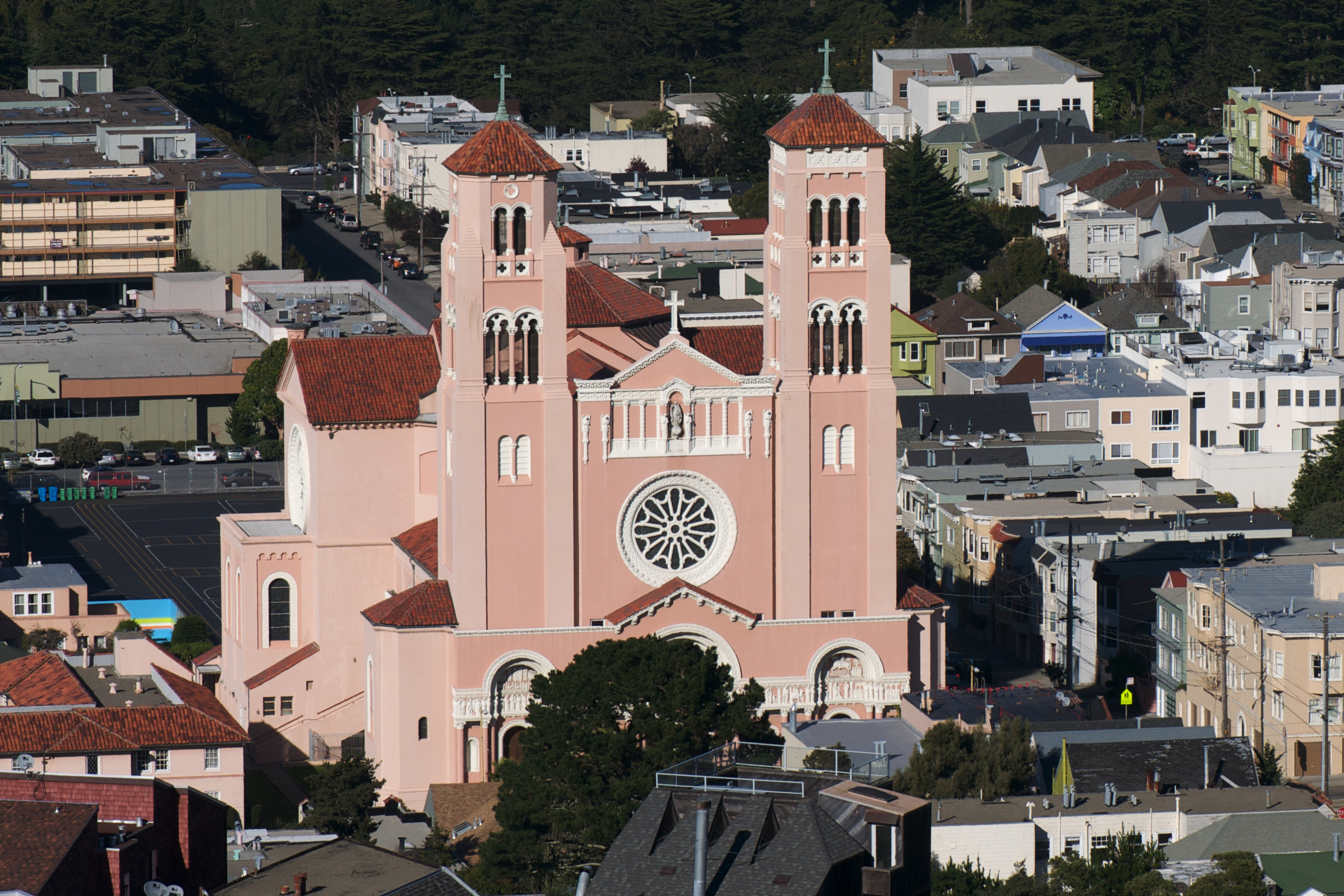

Religion
- Affiliation: Roman Catholic Church
- Diocese: Archdiocese of San Francisco
- Province: Archdiocese of San Francisco
- Leadership: Archbishop of San Francisco

Location
- Location: San Francisco, California, United States
- Interactive map of St. Anne of the Sunset Church

Architecture
- Architect: Shea & Lofquist
- Style: Romanesque Revival
- Completed: 1932
- Direction of façade: North

Website
- Official website

St. Anne of the Sunset Catholic Church in San Francisco is a parish of the Archdiocese of San Francisco in San Francisco, California. St. Anne is one of four Sunset District Catholic churches and mainly caters to the Inner Sunset area near Golden Gate Park and the University of California, San Francisco hospital campus.

== About ==
The larger, rosy-red church can easily be seen from anywhere in the Inner Sunset and a MUNI streetcar has a line that travels along Judah Street in front of the Church. Every year since 1908, the parishioners have held a St. Anne novena (July 17 to July 25, with a solemn Mass on her feast day, July 26) to honor their patron saint. Following Mass, a procession is held around the neighborhood.

In addition to English, the church celebrates mass in Cantonese and formerly Arabic. Mass in Arabic is now celebrated at St. Thomas More parish.

== History ==
The church was founded in 1904. The first church, a small wood-frame structure, was built in 1905 on land donated by a Mrs. Jane Callahan. The church, which then seated up to 450 people, was toppled in the 1906 earthquake. The parish school, St. Anne School, opened in 1920.

Reconstruction for a new church building began in 1930 and was completed two years later in 1932. It was dedicated by Archbishop John J. Mitty. The reconstruction increased the church's seating capacity to 750.

The church is notable for its Romanesque Revival architecture, massive dome, uneven twin towers, great rose windows, and the frieze sculpture that adorns the front facade entrance. The sculpture, created by Mission San Jose Sister Justina Niemierski, OP, depicts a "scriptural account of the whole of salvation history."

== Pastors ==
1. Fr. Joseph J. McCue (1904–1911)
2. Fr. William O’Mahoney (1911–1936)
3. Msgr. Patrick G. Moriarty (1937–1970)
4. Msgr. John T. Foudy (1970–1990)
5. Fr. Richard S. Deitch (1990–1995)
6. Fr. Anthony E. McGuire (1995–1998)
7. Fr. Eduardo A. Dura (1998–2006)
8. Fr. Raymund M. Reyes (2006–2014)
9. Fr. Daniel Nascimento (2014–2026)
10. Fr. James G. Liebner, SVD (2026–present)

== Interior photos ==
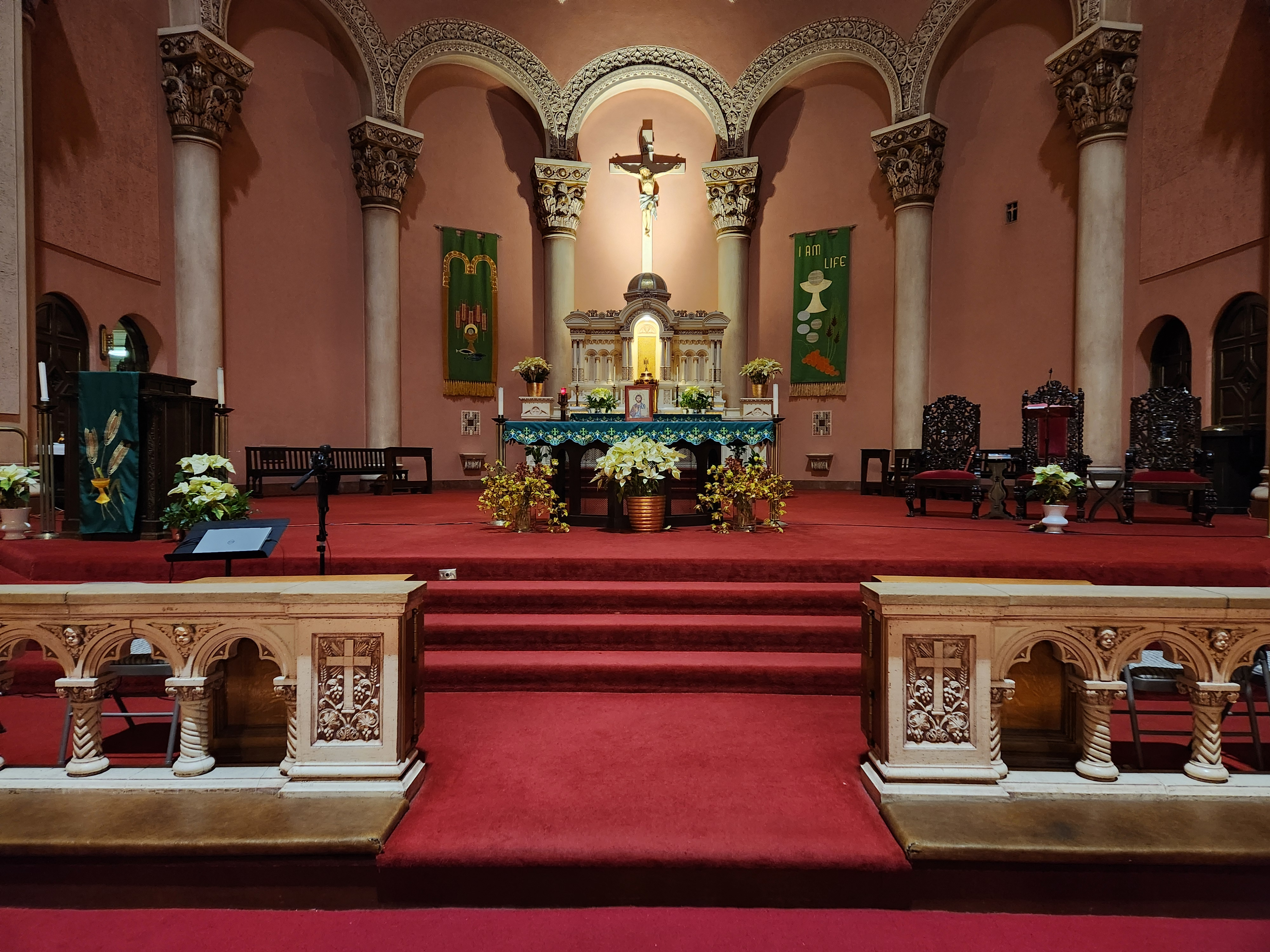

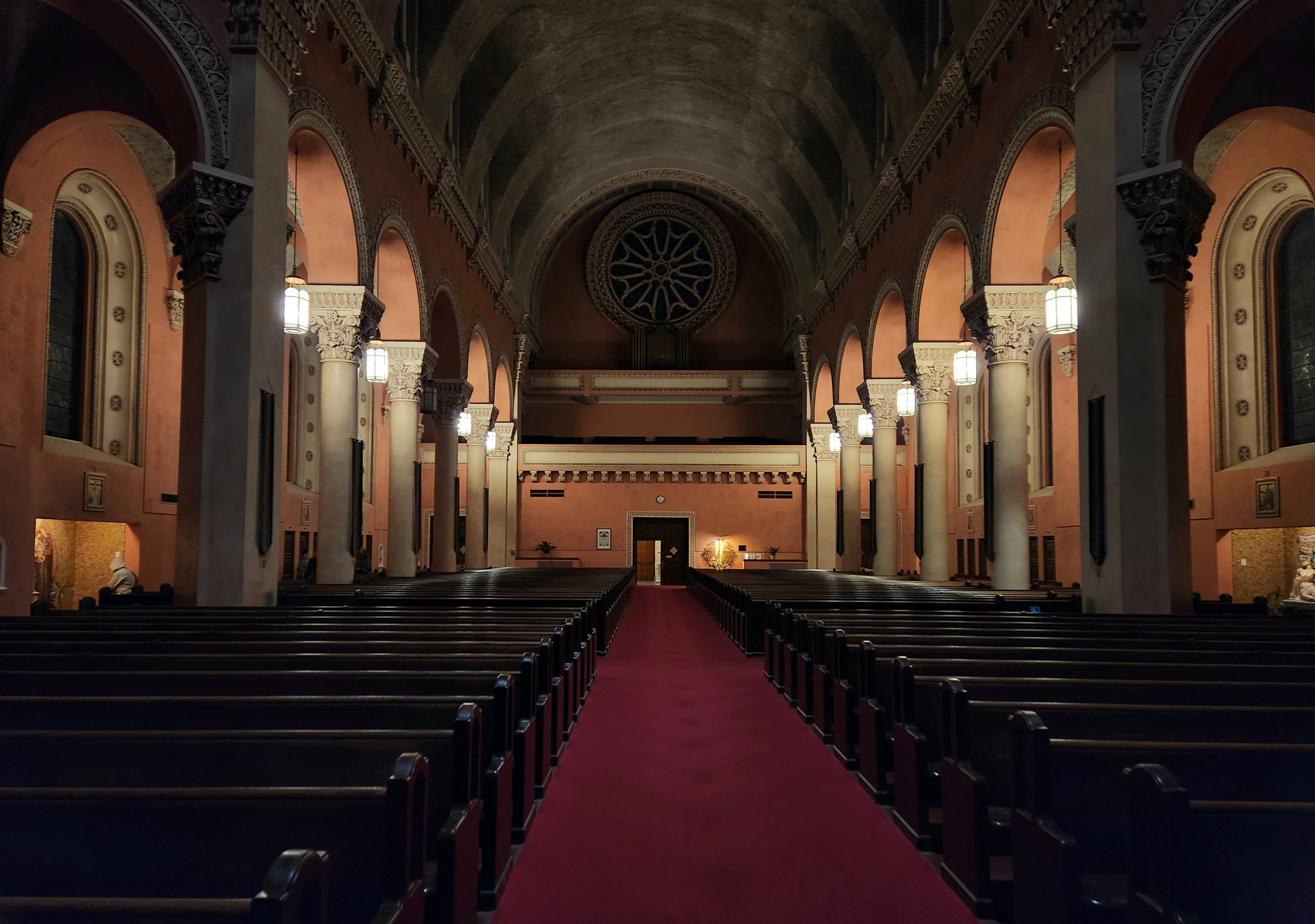

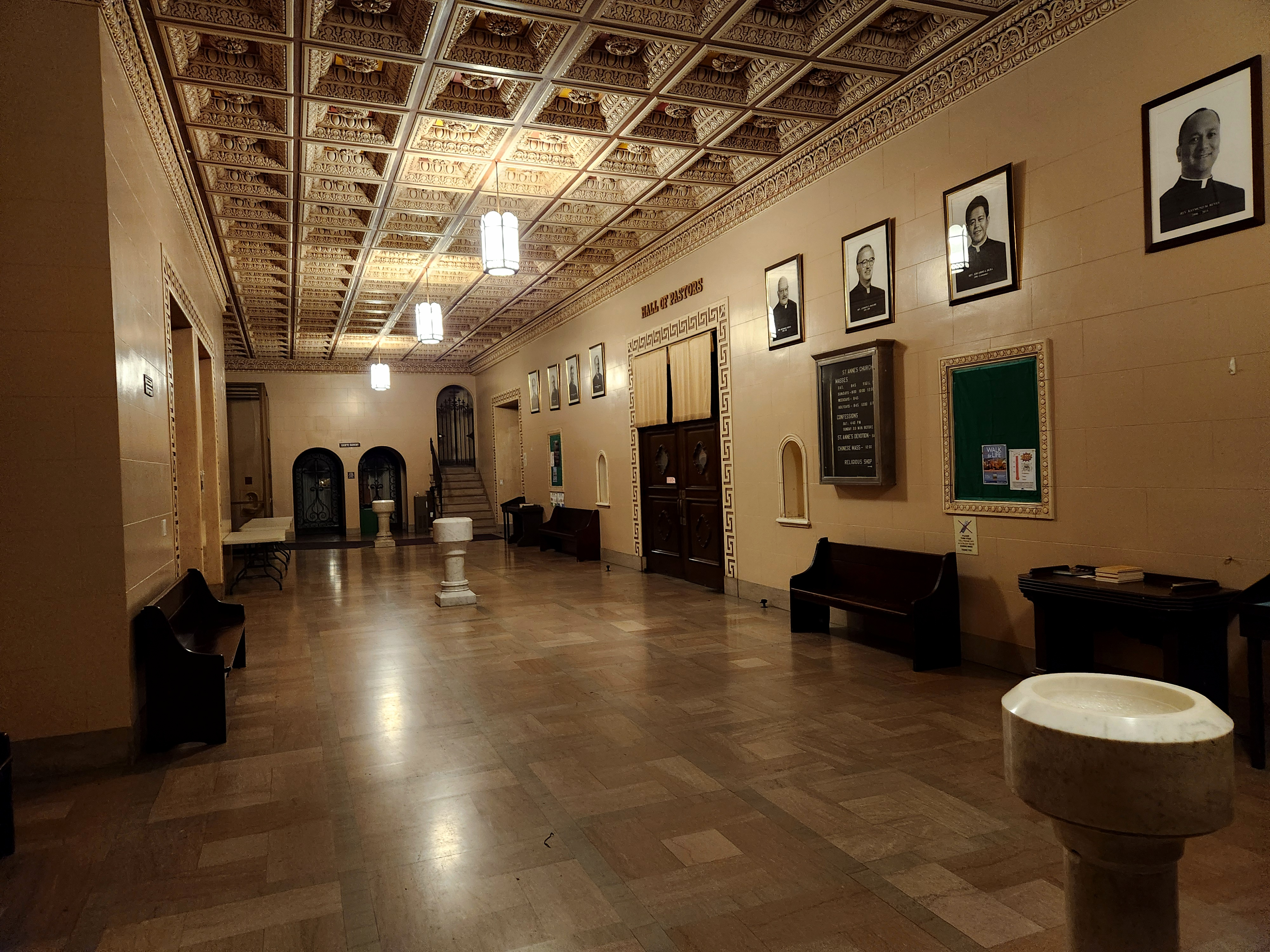
