= Diocese of San José in California =

Latin Catholic ecclesiastical jurisdiction in California, USA

Coordinates: 37°18′07″N 121°52′31″W

Diocese of San José in California Diœcesis Sancti Josephi in California Diócesis de San José en California Giáo Phận Thánh Giuse tại California
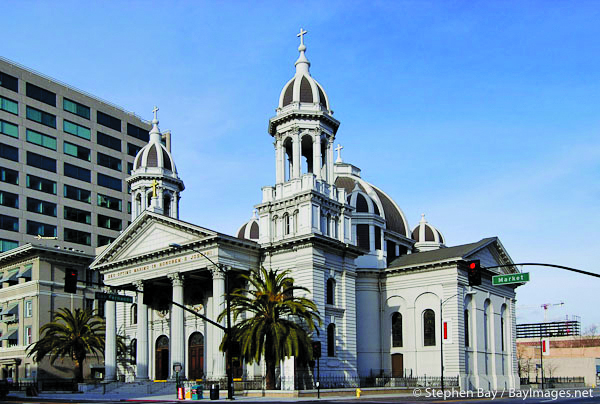
- Cathedral Basilica of St. Joseph

- Coat of arms

Location
- Country: United States
- Territory: County of Santa Clara
- Ecclesiastical province: San Francisco
- Headquarters: 1150 N. First St., San Jose CA 95112

Statistics
- Population: Total; Catholics: (as of 2017); 1,918,044; 633,000 (33.0%)
- Parishes: 52 (including missions)

Information
- Denomination: Catholic
- Sui iuris church: Latin Church
- Rite: Roman Rite
- Established: January 27, 1981
- Cathedral: Cathedral Basilica of St. Joseph
- Co-cathedral: Saint Patrick Proto-Cathedral
- Patron saint: Saint Joseph; Saint Clare of Assisi

Current leadership
- Pope: Leo XIV
- Bishop: Oscar Cantú
- Metropolitan Archbishop: Salvatore Cordileone
- Auxiliary Bishops: Andres Cantoria Ligot

Map
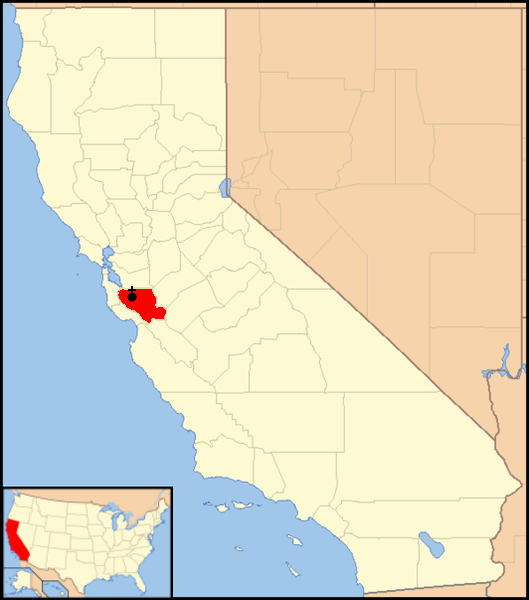

Website
- dsj.org

The Diocese of San José in California (Latin: Diœcesis Sancti Josephi in California) is a diocese of the Catholic Church in Santa Clara County in California in the United States. The mother church is the Cathedral Basilica of St. Joseph in San Jose.

== Statistics ==
The patron saints of the Diocese of San José in California are Saint Joseph and Clare of Assisi. The diocese serves 525,000 Catholics, encompassing 54 parishes, missions, and pastoral centers, eight preschools, 26 TK/K-8th grade, 28 elementary schools and one high school, three college or university campus ministries, one of which part of a Catholic university, and several Catholic cemeteries. They also partner with two independent Catholic elementary schools, five independent Catholic high schools, Catholic Charities of Santa Clara County, and Villa Siena Retirement Community.

== History ==
=== 1777 to 1981 ===
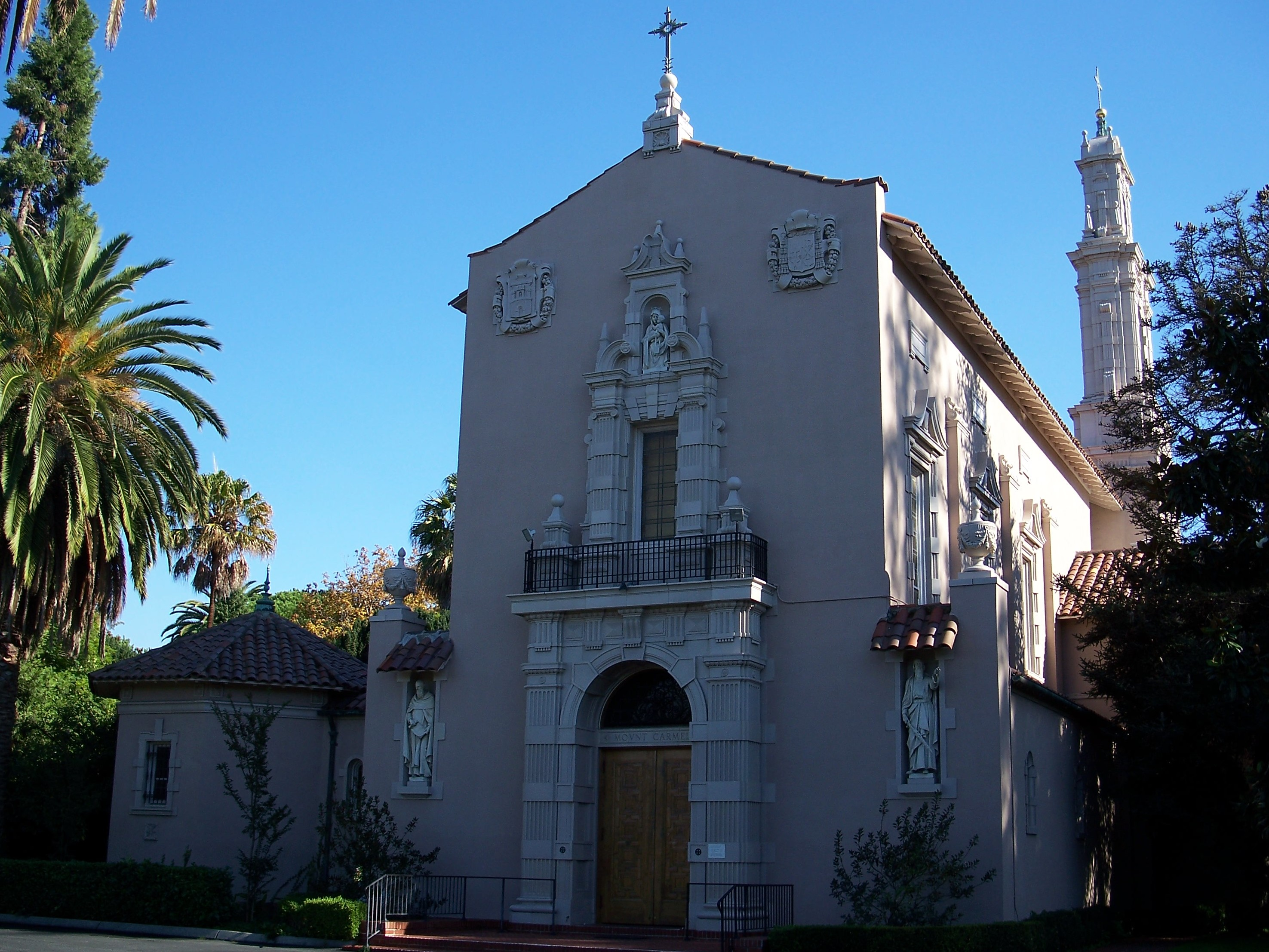
Carmelite Convent of the Infant Jesus, Santa Clara, California (2007)

The first Catholic presence in the present-day San Jose area, then part of the Spanish province of Alta California in New Spain, was the Mission Santa Clara de Asís, built in 1777. The missionary Junipero Serra established the mission on the Guadalupe River to minister to the Ohlone Native Americans.

San Jose de Guadalupe Church was dedicated in San Jose in 1803. It was the first church built for Spanish settlers in Alta California, as opposed to mission churches established for evangelizing Native Americans. In 1840, the Vatican moved Alta California, now part of the Republic of Mexico, into the Diocese of Alta and Baja California.

After the Mexican-American War ended in 1848, Alta California became an American territory. In 1850, the Vatican transferred the new State of California from its Mexican diocese to the new American Diocese of Monterey. Santa Clara College, the first higher education institution in California, was founded in 1851 by Franciscan Fathers in Santa Clara.

In 1853, the Vatican moved the northern half of Santa Clara County into the newly erected Archdiocese of San Francisco. In 1922, the Vatican transferred the southern half of Santa Clara County from the Diocese of Monterey to the Archdiocese of San Francisco. Saint Clare Parish was established in 1925 as the successor to the Mission Santa Clara de Asís.

=== 1981 to 2000 ===
The Diocese of San José in California was erected in 1981, taking Santa Clara County from the Archdiocese of San Francisco. Auxiliary Bishop Pierre DuMaine of San Francisco as the first bishop. The Saint Patrick Proto-Cathedral was designated as the diocesan cathedral.

The 1989 Loma Prieta earthquake in Northern California caused $22 million in damage to St. Joseph's Cathedral. The earthquake also caused one death and extensive damage to Saint Joseph's Seminary in Mountain View. The diocese decided to closed Saint Joseph's, demolish the building, and sell part of the property. It used the cash proceeds to repair the cathedral. The diocese donated the remaining 138 acres (0.56 km^{2}) to the country to create the Rancho San Antonio County Park. Auxiliary Bishop Patrick J. McGrath of San Francisco was made coadjutor bishop of the diocese in 1998. After DuMaine retired in 1999, McGrath succeeded him as the next bishop of San José.

=== 2000 to present ===
In 2017, Hien Minh Nguyen, director of the Vietnamese Catholic Center in San Jose, was sentenced to three years in prison for bank fraud and tax evasion after stealing US$1.4 million in donations to the center.

Bishop Oscar Cantú of the Diocese of Las Cruces was made coadjutor bishop of San José in July 2018 to assist McGrath. The next month, using money from a diocesan account for bishop housing, McGrath purchased a five-bedroom for his retirement, costing $2.3 million. After receiving criticism for the purchase, McGrath said the diocese would sell the house and give the sale proceeds to Catholic Charities. Cantú took office after McGrath retired in 2019.

=== Reports of sex abuse ===
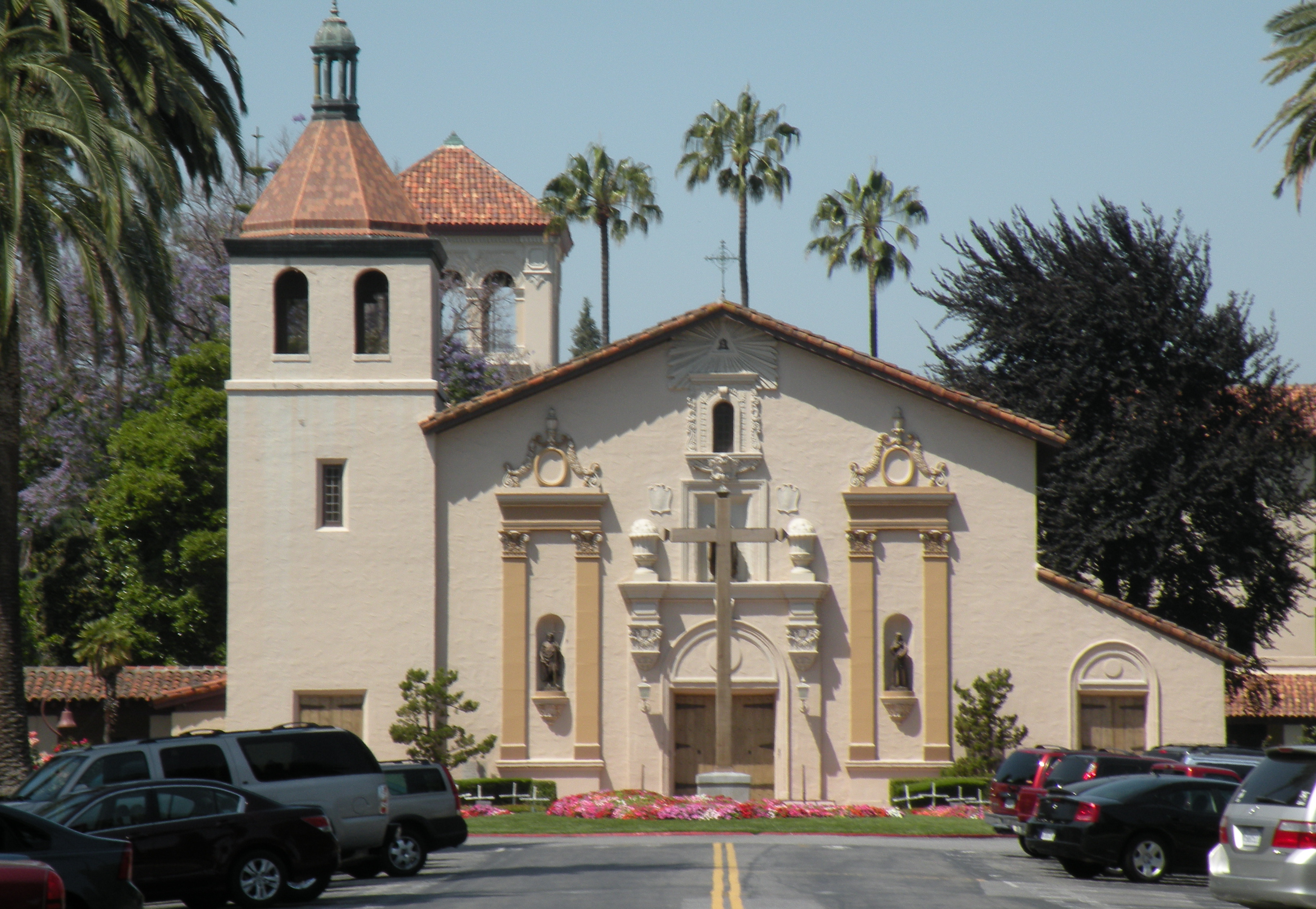
Mission Santa Clara de Asís, Santa Clara, California (2009)

In 2005, the Archdiocese of San Francisco agreed to a $21 million financial settlement to 15 alleged victims of sexual abuse. The plaintiffs were abused by several priests during the 1960s and 1970s when they were minors in the San Jose area, then part of the archdiocese of San Francisco.

In 2018, the diocese released the names of 15 former diocesan priests who were "credibly accused" of sexual abuse of minors. It was also reported that the diocese knew about allegations against these priests and shielded them from potential prosecution.

== Bishops ==
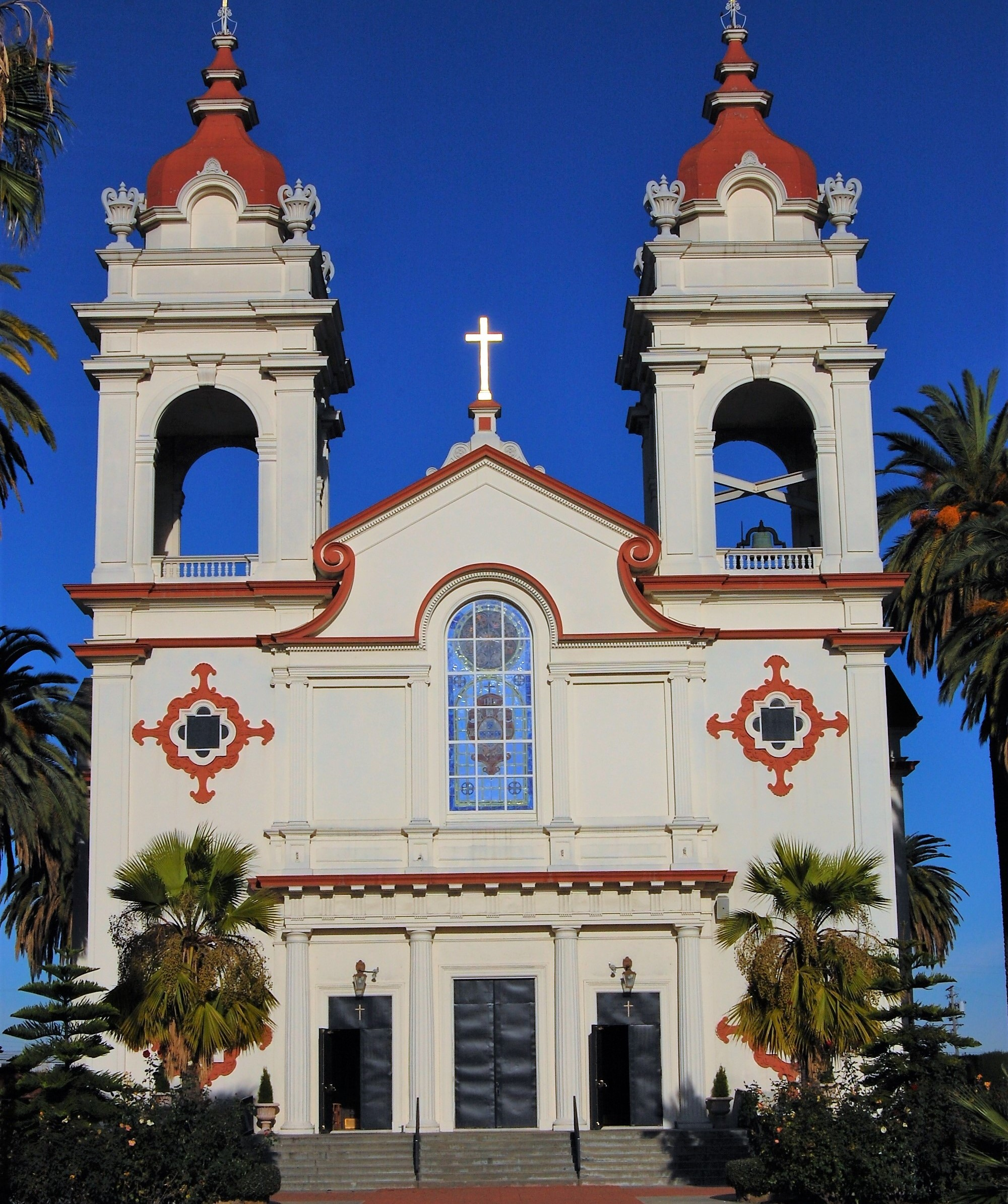
Five Wounds Portuguese National Church, San Jose, California (2010)

=== Bishops of San José in California ===
1. Pierre DuMaine (January 27, 1981 – November 27, 1999)
2. Patrick Joseph McGrath (November 27, 1999 – May 1, 2019)
3. Oscar Cantú (May 1, 2019–present)

=== Coadjutor Bishops ===
- Patrick Joseph McGrath (1998–1999)
- Oscar Cantú (2018–2019)

=== Auxiliary Bishop ===
- Thomas A. Daly (May 25, 2011 – May 20, 2015), appointed Bishop of Spokane
- Andres (“Andy”) C. Ligot (2025-present)

=== Other diocesan priest who became bishop ===
- Richard John Garcia, appointed auxiliary bishop of Sacramento in 1997, appointed Bishop of Monterey in 2006

== Education ==
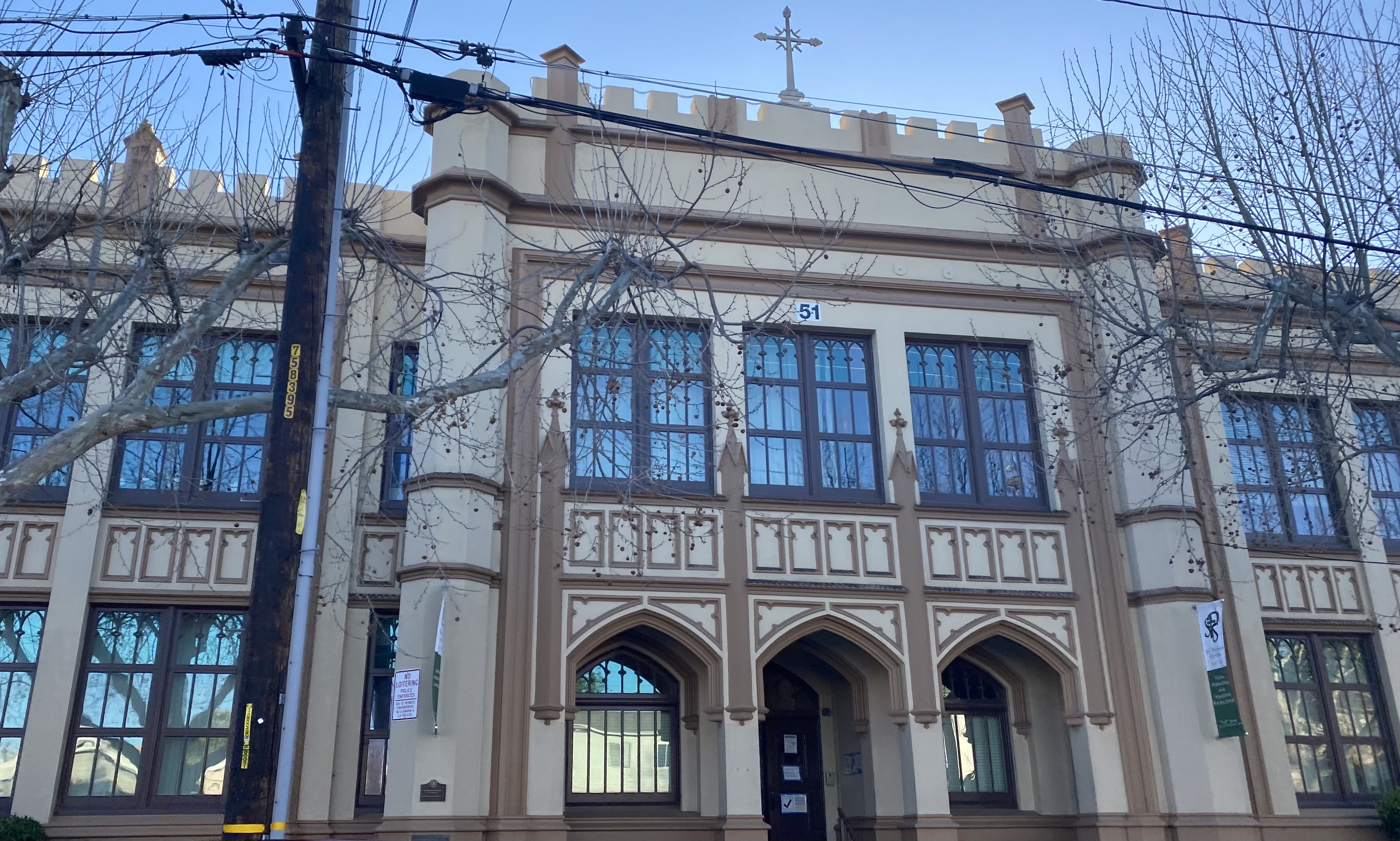
Saint Patrick School, San Jose, California (2021)

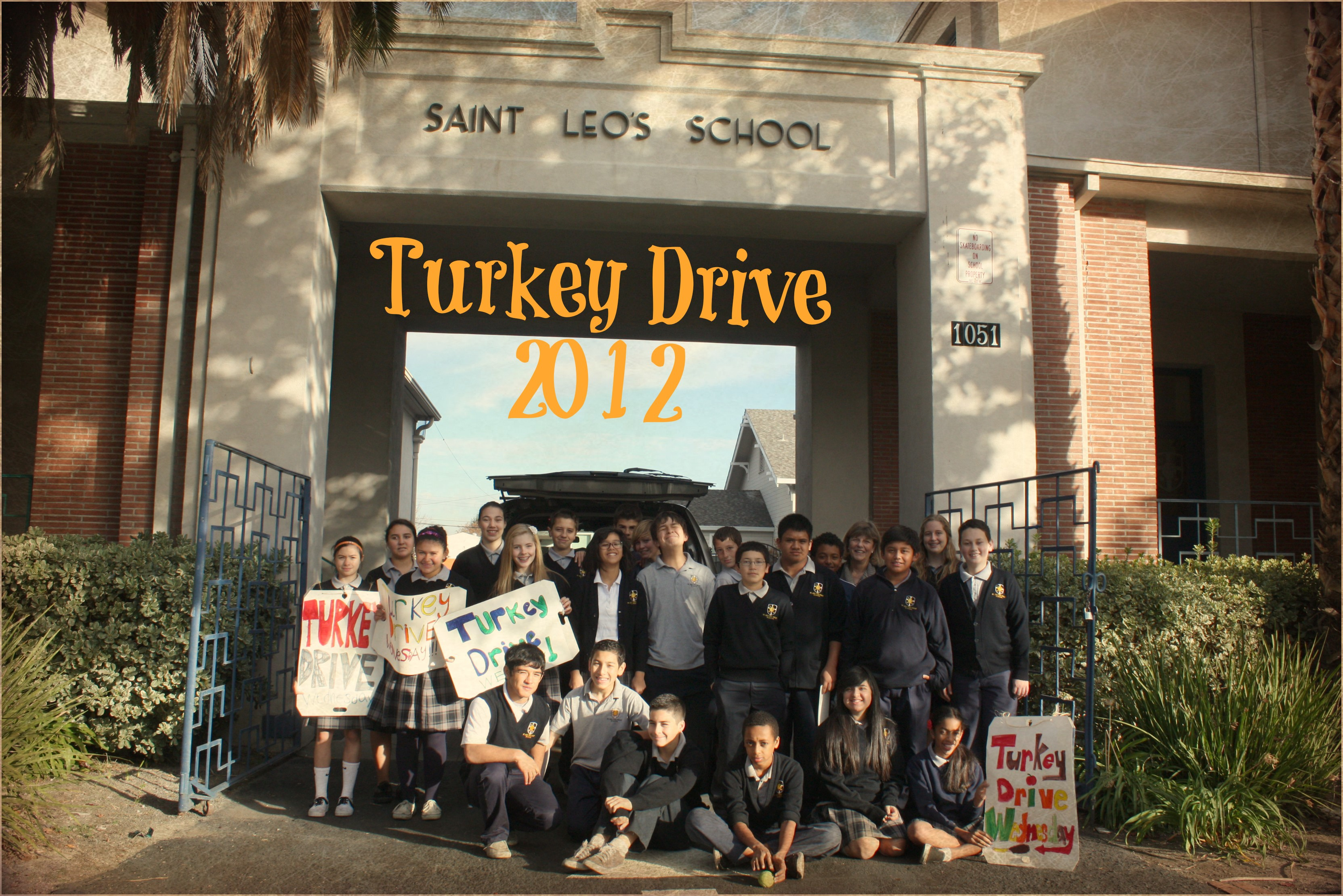
Saint Leo the Great School, San Jose, California (2012)

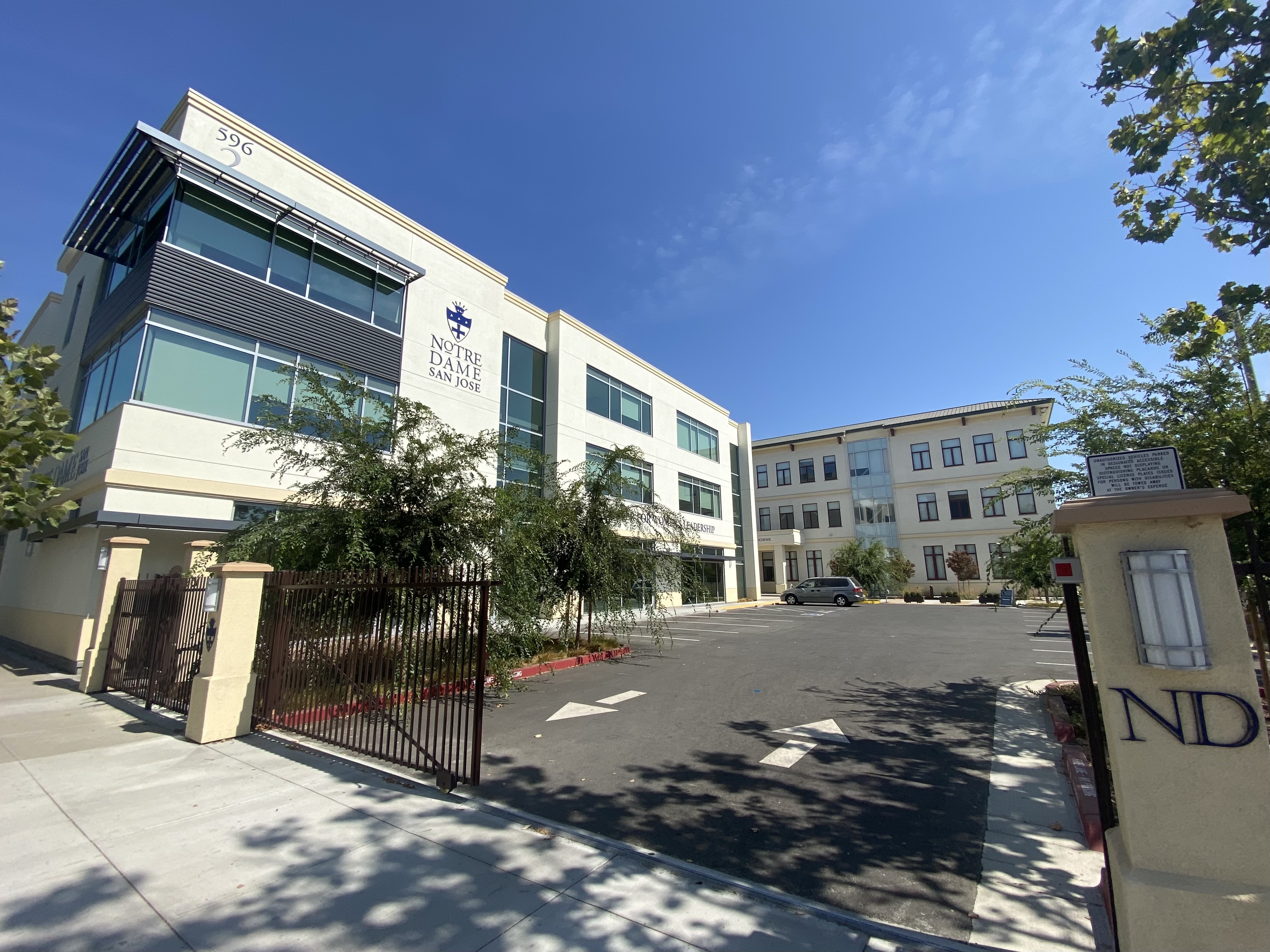
Notre Dame High School, San Jose, California (2021)

As of 2025, the Diocese of San Jose contains 28 Catholic elementary schools, six Catholic high schools with an enrollment exceeding 14,000 students. Most of the primary schools are parochial, or operated by a parish, while all the high schools are operated by either the diocese or by a religious institute.

=== University ===
Santa Clara University is a Jesuit-run university at the site of Mission Santa Clara.

=== High Schools ===
- Archbishop Mitty High School- San Jose (Diocesan)
- Bellarmine College Preparatory- San Jose (All-boys, Jesuit)
- Cristo Rey San José Jesuit High School- San Jose (Cristo Rey Network)
- Notre Dame High School- San Jose (All-girls, Sisters of Notre Dame de Namur)
- Presentation High School- San Jose (All-girls, Sisters of the Presentation)
- Saint Francis High School- Mountain View (Brothers of the Holy Cross)

== Arms ==
Coat of arms of Diocese of San José in California
| Notes Arms was designed and adopted when the diocese was erected Adopted 1981 Escutcheon The diocesan arms consists of three mountains, a diagonal band of Latin crosses, a rose and a carpenter's set square. Symbolism The crosses symbolize the California missions, including Santa Clara de Asis. The rose represents Mary (Our Lady of Guadalupe) and the carpenter's square represents St. Joseph. The mountains symbolize the Santa Clara Valley. |

== Media ==
The Diocese of San José in California publishes a quarterly trilingual magazine, The Valley Catholic.
