= William J. Justice =

American prelate

His Excellency, The Most Reverend William J. Justice
- Auxiliary Bishop Emeritus of San Francisco
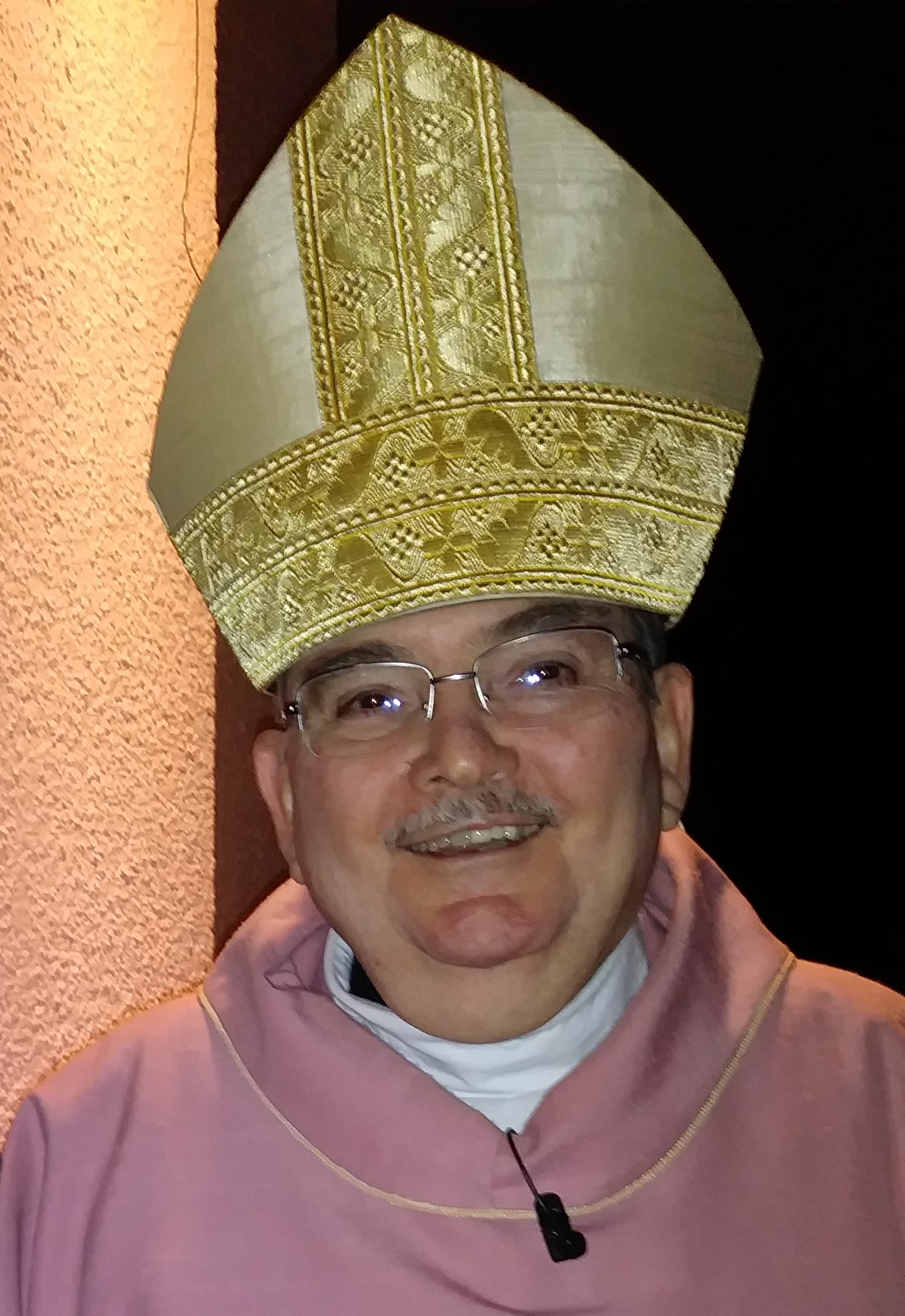
- Justice in 2017
- Church: Catholic Church
- Archdiocese: San Francisco
- Appointed: April 10, 2008
- Retired: November 16, 2017
- Other post: Titular Bishop of Mathara in Proconsulari (2008 - )

Orders
- Ordination: May 17, 1968 by Joseph Thomas McGucken
- Consecration: May 28, 2008 by George Hugh Niederauer, John Charles Wester, and Randolph Roque Calvo

Personal details
- Born: May 8, 1942 (age 84) Lawrence, Massachusetts. US
- Motto: God's mercy endures forever

Styles of William Joseph Justice
- Reference style: His Excellency; The Most Reverend
- Spoken style: Your Excellency
- Religious style: Bishop

William Joseph Justice (born May 8, 1942) is an American Catholic prelate who served as an auxiliary bishop for the Archdiocese of San Francisco from 2008 to 2017.

== Biography ==
=== Early life and clerical formation ===
William Joseph Justice was born in Lawrence, Massachusetts on May 8, 1942. His family moved to San Mateo, California in 1946. From 1948 to 1951, Justice attended St. Matthew Elementary School in San Mateo, then transferred in 1956 to St. Gregory Elementary School in San Mateo. In 1960, he graduated from Junípero Serra High School in San Mateo.

Justice entered St. Joseph College in Mountain View, California in 1962 and later attended at St. Patrick Seminary in Menlo Park, California, where he earned a Master of Divinity degree in 1968.

=== Priesthood ===
Justice was ordained into the priesthood for the Archdiocese of San Francisco on May 17, 1968, by Archbishop Joseph McGucken,

After his ordination, Justices was assigned as parochial vicar to St. John the Evangelist Parish in San Francisco. In the summer of 1969, he attended a Spanish language program in Guadalajara, Mexico. In 1970, Justice was transferred to All Souls Parish in South San Francisco, California. He attended the Intensive Spanish Language Program at Cuernavaca, Mexico in summer of 1971. Justice was reassigned in 1976 to St. Paul Parish in San Francisco.

In 1979, Justice became director of the Office of the Permanent Diaconate along with parochial vicar of Saint Timothy Church in San Francisco. He received a Master of Applied Spirituality degree in 1980 from the University of San Francisco. In 1981, while still working at Saint Timothy, Justice was named as secretary of the Office of Pastoral Ministry.

Justice was named pastor of Saint Peter Parish in 1985, then moved in 1991 to become parochial vicar of All Souls Parish. In 1992, he was also named the secretary of pastoral ministry for the archdiocese In 2003, Justice was reassigned as pastor of the Mission Dolores Basilica Parish and in 2007 appointed as archdiocesan vicar for clergy.

=== Auxiliary Bishop of San Francisco ===
On April 10, 2008, Pope Benedict XVI appointed Justice as the titular bishop of Matara de Proconsolari and as an auxiliary bishop of San Francisco. He was consecrated by Archbishop George Niederauer on May 28, 2008, at the Cathedral of Saint Mary of the Assumption in San Francisco. His co-consecrators were Bishop John Wester and Bishop Randolph Calvo.

While he was episcopal vicar for clergy, Justice also served as vicar general of the archdiocese. Justice was a trustee of St. Patrick Seminary. He chaired three archdiocesan boards: the Priest Personnel Board, the Ongoing Formation Board, and the Priests' Retirement Board. Justice chaired the Priests' Council from September 2006 to June 2007 and took part in the Alliance of Mission District Catholic Schools while pastor of Mission Dolores Basilica Parish.

=== Retirement ===
On November 16, 2017, Pope Francis accepted Justice's letter of resignation as auxiliary bishop of San Francisco at the retirement age of 75.

== See also ==
- Catholic Church hierarchy
- Catholic Church in the United States
- Historical list of the Catholic bishops of the United States
- List of Catholic bishops of the United States
- Lists of patriarchs, archbishops, and bishops

Catholic Church titles
Preceded by -	Auxiliary Bishop of San Francisco & Vicar for Clergy; 2008-2017	Succeeded by -
