= John Charles Wester =

American Catholic prelate (born 1950)

His Excellency, The Most Reverend John Charles Wester
- Archbishop of Santa Fe
- Archdiocese: Santa Fe
- Appointed: April 27, 2015
- Installed: June 4, 2015
- Predecessor: Michael Jarboe Sheehan
- Other posts: Chairman, USCCB Communications Committee
- Previous post: Bishop of Salt Lake City (2007-2015); Auxiliary Bishop of San Francisco and Titular Bishop of Lamiggiga (1998-2007)

Orders
- Ordination: May 15, 1976 by Joseph Thomas McGucken
- Consecration: September 18, 1998 by William Joseph Levada, John R. Quinn, and Patrick Joseph McGrath

Personal details
- Born: November 5, 1950 (age 76) San Francisco, California, US
- Education: Saint Patrick Seminary
- Motto: Abide in Christ
- Signature: John Charles Wester's signature
- Styles
- Reference style: His Excellency; The Most Reverend
- Spoken style: Your Excellency
- Religious style: Archbishop

John Charles Wester (born November 5, 1950) is an American Catholic prelate serving as Archbishop of Santa Fe since 2015. He previously served as Bishop of Salt Lake City from 2007 to 2015 and as an auxiliary bishop for the Archdiocese of San Francisco from 1998 to 2007.

== Early life and education ==
Wester was born in San Francisco, California, on November 5, 1950, the fourth generation of his family born there. Wester attended Our Lady of Mercy Parish School in Daly City. Wester graduated from St. Joseph's College Seminary in Mountain View, in 1972 before attending St. Patrick's Seminary in Menlo Park, where he earned a Master of Divinity degree in 1976. Wester received a Master of Applied Science degree from the University of San Francisco in 1984, and then a Master of Spiritual Theology degree from Holy Names College in Oakland in 1993.

== Early career ==
Wester was ordained a priest by Archbishop Joseph McGucken for the Archdiocese of San Francisco at the Cathedral of Saint Mary of the Assumption on May 15, 1976.

After his 1976 ordination, the archdiocese assigned Wester as associate pastor at Saint Raphael Parish in San Rafael. In 1979, he was appointed as a teacher and director of campus ministry at Marin Catholic High School in Kentfield. Wester later became president of the high school and eventually assistant superintendent for high schools for the archdiocese.

In 1988, Archbishop John R. Quinn named Wester as his assistant. Wester's first appointment as pastor was at Saint Stephen Parish in San Francisco in 1993. Wester returned to the Pastoral Center in 1997 to become the vicar for clergy. where he was named a monsignor.

=== Auxiliary Bishop of San Francisco ===
On June 30, 1998, Pope John Paul II appointed Wester as titular bishop of Lamiggiga and as an auxiliary bishop of San Francisco. He received his episcopal consecration at the Cathedral of Saint Mary of the Assumption from Cardinal William Levada on September 18, 1998. Wester then served as moderator of the curia until 2003. While he was episcopal vicar for clergy, Wester also served as vicar general of the archdiocese. He also served as apostolic administrator from August 2005 to February 2006. Wester was heavily involved in sexual abuse cases in the archdiocese, meeting with victims and accused clergy.

=== Bishop of Salt Lake City ===
Pope Benedict XVI named Wester bishop of Salt Lake City on January 8, 2007, and he was installed there on March 14, 2007.

=== Archbishop of Santa Fe ===
Pope Francis appointed Wester archbishop of the Archdiocese of Santa Fe on April 27, 2015.

In 2019, Wester condemned Santa Muerte (Saint Death), a recent religious movement in Mexico and South America inspired by drug traffickers. He said that devotion to Santa Muerte was inconsistent with Catholic teachings.

Wester has been involved with the US Conference of Catholic Bishops (USCCB) as a member of the Bishops Committee on Vocations, chairman of Northern California Ch'an/Zen-Catholic Dialogue, consultant for the Subcommittee on Interreligious Dialogue, member of the Migration Committee, the Pastoral Practices Committee, World Mission Committee, the Subcommittee on Lay Ministry, and as the USCCB bishop-liaison to Asia.

Wester has also been a strong advocate for the poor and marginalized in American society.

Catholic Church titles
Preceded by Michael Sheehan	Archbishop of Santa Fe; June 2, 2015 – present	Incumbent
Preceded by George Hugh Niederauer	Bishop of Salt Lake City; January 8, 2007 – April 27, 2015	Succeeded by Oscar A. Solis
Preceded by Gonzalo Duarte García de Cortázar	Titular Bishop of Lamiggiga; June 30, 1998 – January 8, 2007	Succeeded by José Luis Mendoza Corzo
