= Sexual abuse scandal in the Roman Catholic Archdiocese of San Francisco =

The sexual abuse scandal in the Roman Catholic Archdiocese of San Francisco was one of the most prominent episodes in the sexual abuse scandal in the United States during the late 20th and early 21st centuries. The Archdiocese of San Francisco covers the City of San Francisco and two counties in the Bay Area of California.

As of 2025, five clerics from the archdiocese had been convicted of sexual abuse crimes. Their sentences ranged from probation to eight years in prison. Their victims ranged in age from 11 to 17 years old. A change in the statute of limitations law in California in 1993 prompted the indictments and prosecutions of many clerics accused of abuse in the 1960s and 1970s. Their victims testified about being raped and forced into oral sex and masturbation. However, a US Supreme Court decision that year overturned the statute of limitations law, forcing the dismissal or overturning of all these cases.

Beginning in the 1990s, the archdiocese started facing a wave of civil lawsuits by sexual abuse victims. By 2018, it had paid $87 million in financial settlements to victims. However, the unresolved lawsuits reached 500 by 2023, forcing the archdiocese to seek bankruptcy protection.

== Actions by State of California ==
The State of California had eased its statute of limitations requirements in 1993 for sexual abuse cases that were previously too old to be prosecuted. However, the US Supreme Court overturned that law in 2004. As a result, prosecutors were forced to file for dismissal of numerous cases of sexual abuse by clerics throughout the state.

In May 2019, California Attorney General Xavier Becerra opened an investigation into how the Catholic dioceses in California handled sexual abuse allegations. He directed the dioceses to preserve all of their sexual abuse records.

California in January 2023 expanded its statute of limitations for sexual abuse crimes, increasing the opportunities for victims to sue for crimes happening when they were children.

== Actions by Archdiocese of San Francisco ==
In November 2018, Archbishop Archbishop Salvatore Cordileone reported that the archdiocese spent $87 million to settle 125 sexual abuse lawsuits He said that no sexual abuse incidents had been reported in the archdiocese since 2000.

In August 2023, the archdiocese filed for Chapter 11 bankruptcy in the San Francisco County Superior Court in order to create a settlement for an estimated 500 sexual abuse lawsuits that it was facing. In April 2025, the bankruptcy court ordered the archdiocese to provide access to certain record to attorneys involved in sexual abuse lawsuits. It was revealed that as early as 2003 the archdiocese had created a secret list of 51 priests with credible allegations of sexual abuse.

== Sexual abuse convictions ==
The following priests and religious brother who served in the Archdiocese of San Francisco were convicted in an American court of sexual abuse crimes.

=== Salvatore Billante ===
During the 1970s Billante, a member of the Salesian order, was assigned as a teacher to the Corpus Christi Parish school in the Excelsior District of San Francisco. The Salesians then sent him to teach at the Salesian High School in Richmond. He later admitted to sexually abusing 15 children at these two schools. Billante pleaded guilty in November 1989 to one count of lewd and lascivious acts with a minor. He was sentenced in 1989 to eight years in San Quentin Prison. He was released after four years.

=== Arthur Manuel Cunha ===
In 1991, Cunha pleaded guilty to molesting two minors and was sentenced to 60 days in jail and four months of counseling.

=== Bernard Dabbene ===
In November 2000, police arrested Dabbene in San Francisco on charges of assault with intent to commit oral copulation and false imprisonment, and misdemeanor counts of annoying or molesting a child and sexually battery. At that time, Dabbene was serving on the board of education for the archdiocesan schools. Police had found Dabbene and a 17-year-old in a car with their pants unzipped. In March 2001, he pleaded guilty to a misdemeanor charge of molesting a minor and was sentenced to probation with community service.

=== Carl Anthony Schipper ===
In 2000, Schipper was an academic dean at Saint Patrick's Seminary and University in Menlo Park. Since September 1999, he had been engaged in a series of online chats with an undercover police officer. Schipper was arrested in March 2000 in Santa Rosa and charged with five counts of shipping harmful matter to minors over the internet. He pleaded guilty in August 2000 and was sentenced in November 2000 to six months in jail and probation.

=== Jose Superiaso ===
Superiaso, a priest from the Philippines, pleaded guilty in June 2006 to six counts of lewd and lascivious conduct with a child under the age of 14. He was sentenced to ten years in prison in California.
