= Sacred Heart Parish Complex (San Francisco) =

Former church campus in San Francisco, California

- U.S. National Register of Historic Places
- San Francisco Designated Landmark
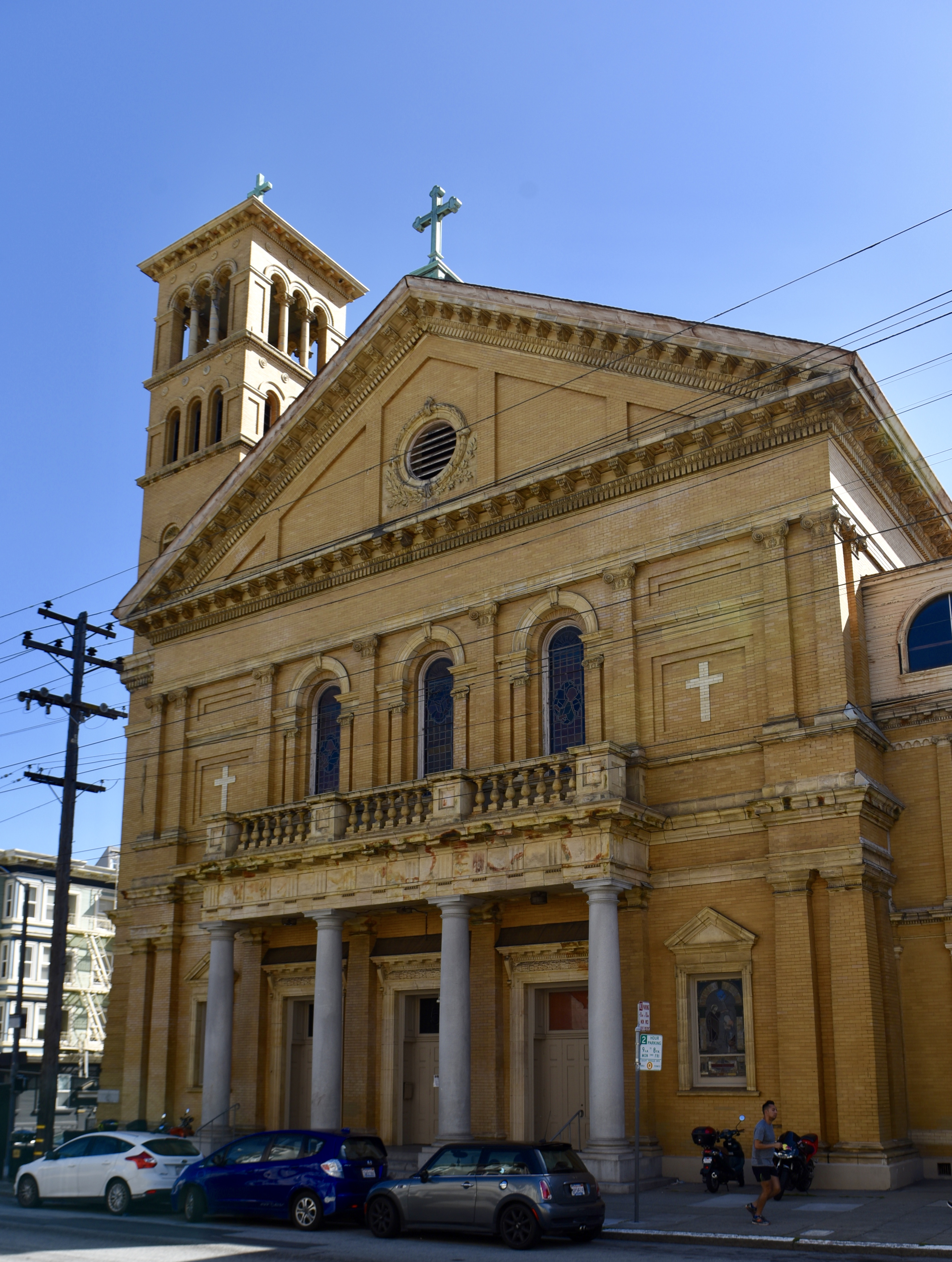

- Location within California
- Location: 546 and 554 Fillmore, 735 Fell & 660 Oak Streets; San Francisco, California, U.S.
- Coordinates: 37°46′29″N 122°25′52″W
- Area: 0.95 acres (0.38 ha)
- Architects: Thomas J. Welsh (church), Hugh Keenan (rectory), John J. Foley (school and convent)
- NRHP reference No.: 100001665
- SFDL No.: 316

Significant dates
- Added to NRHP: September 28, 2017
- Designated SFDL: March 28, 2024

Sacred Heart Parish Complex is a set of historic former Catholic Church buildings, located in the Western Addition neighborhood of San Francisco, California. It consists of four buildings: the Romanesque Revival style Sacred Heart Church (c. 1898 – c. 1909), a rectory (c. 1891 – c. 1906), a school building (1926), and a convent (1936); and it was founded as part of the Archdiocese of San Francisco. It is listed on the National Register of Historic Places since September 28, 2017; and as a San Francisco Designated Landmark (No. 316) since March 28, 2024.

== Architecture ==
The Sacred Heart Church design is association with architect Thomas J. Welsh Sr. (1845–1918) of Welsh & Carey, who designed over 400 buildings in San Francisco, and was a practitioner of the Romanesque Revival style (but sometimes described as Lombardy Romanesque). The rectory was designed by Hugh Keenan of Welsh & Carey, and the school and convent was designed by John J. Foley.

All extant stained glass windows in Sacred Heart Church were installed in 1898. The Riordan Art Glass Studios (later known as BeauVerre Riordan Studios) of Cincinnati, Ohio, designed and executed the three Costello memorial windows (created in memory of Augustine, Joseph, and Charles Costello).

== History ==
The complex occupies four contiguous lots on the same block bounded by Fillmore Street (west), Fell Street (north), Webster Street (east), and Oak Street (south).

The parish was founded by a large Irish-Catholic community, and after World War II the congregation became heavily African American. The pastor of this church from 1968 to 1972 was Rev. Eugene Boyle, who was a politically-active clergyman and influential civil rights activist. Under Boyle's leadership, the parish hosted the Black Panther Party Breakfast Program, held meetings of student and union activists. Later there were influxes of Latinos, Filipinos, and LGBT parishioners, making it one of the most diverse congregations in the city by the 1990s.

The final church mass was held by pastor Paulinus Mangesho in December 2004. The Archdiocese of San Francisco closed this parish because it was estimated to cost US $8 million to retrofit the building; and after retrofitting other churches in the city, they had decided this location was expendable.

== Closure and redevelopment ==
A few years prior to closing, the church struggled financially and the school had low enrollment. In 2005, the property was sold to a private owner, with plans to turn it into a private school campus. The site’s redevelopment for housing emerged in 2017, and has been ongoing. In 2024, it was proposed to turn the space into housing with an events space.

Since 2013, the Church Of 8 Wheels Roller Disco, a rollerskating pop-up founded by David Miles Jr., has occupied the former parish and hosted rollerskating related events.

== See also ==
- National Register of Historic Places listings in San Francisco
- List of San Francisco Designated Landmarks
