= Most Holy Redeemer Church, San Francisco =

Roman catholic church in San Francisco

Coordinates: 37.76029°N 122.4374°W

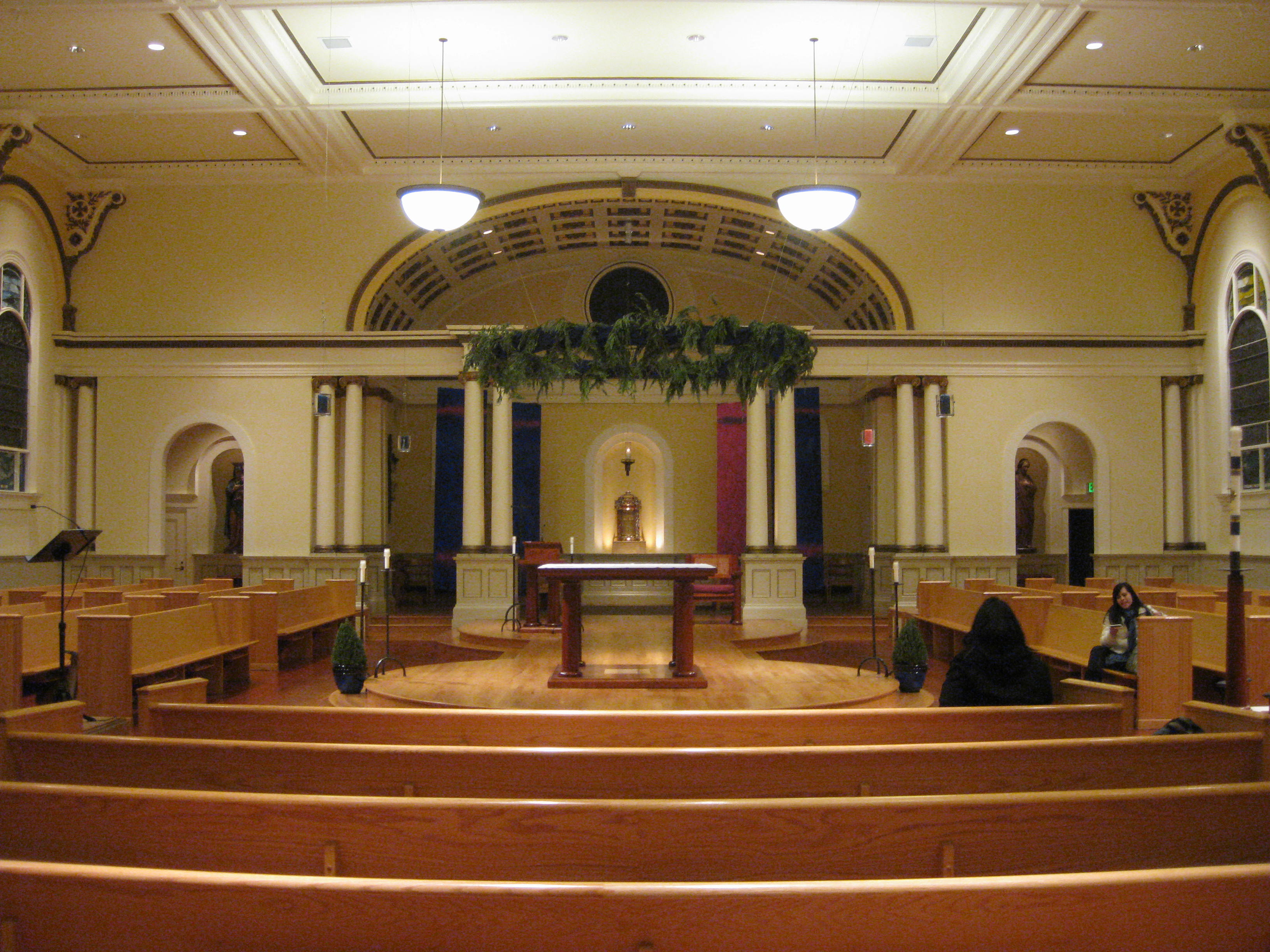
Most Holy Redeemer Church in 2009

Most Holy Redeemer Church in San Francisco, California, United States, is a Roman Catholic parish situated in The Castro district, located at 100 Diamond Street (at 18th Street).

== History ==
The parish was established by the Roman Catholic Archdiocese of San Francisco in 1900. It describes itself as "an inclusive Catholic community – embracing all people of good faith – Catholics as well as those people interested in learning about the Catholic experience – regardless of their background, gender, race, social status or sexual orientation." The current pastoral team head is Fr. Matt Link, C.PP.S.

In The Mayor of Castro Street: The Life and Times of Harvey Milk, Randy Shilts mentions the church several times. The church was later vandalized by anti-Proposition 8 protesters, although many churchgoers were opposed to the ballot initiative.

For many years, Most Holy Redemer was the home of Father William Young, one of the select priests in the Bay Area qualified to celebrate the Tridentine Mass. Father Young celebrated this weekdays at Most Holy Redeemer, and each Sunday at St. Vincent's Holy Rosary Chapel in Marinwood.

== Ministry to LGBT people and AIDS outreach ==
In the 1980s, the neighborhood was deteriorating and the parish with it. Property values fell and a largely gay population moved in. Seeing the change in the neighborhood, Archbishop John R. Quinn appointed Fr. Tony McGuire as pastor of the church in 1983. McGuire brought together the largely older women who made up most of the remaining congregation and the few gay men who joined the parish. Together they began an outreach to the new gay population of the neighborhood.

As the AIDS epidemic hit the gay community, the parish began providing services to those in need. The parish paired parishioners with people suffering from AIDS in the neighborhood to give them rides to the doctors, help around the house, or meet other needs. The older women in the parish were instrumental in this ministry. It became a place "that helped save souls and helped save lives."

In 1986, a scroll was begun with the names of parishioners who had died of AIDS. Framed photos of some of them line the church. Quinn regularly visited this parish, especially during the annual 40 Hours Vigil held throughout the 1980s in support of those who were HIV-positive and their caregivers.

As of 2020, the AIDS support group is active again, though it is smaller than it was in the 1980s. The current "parish offers a spiritual home to all: senior citizens and youth; single people and families; those who are straight, gay, lesbian, and transgender; the healthy and the sick, particularly persons with HIV/AIDS."
