= Old St. Mary's Cathedral =

Historic church in California, United States

Old Saint Mary's Cathedral
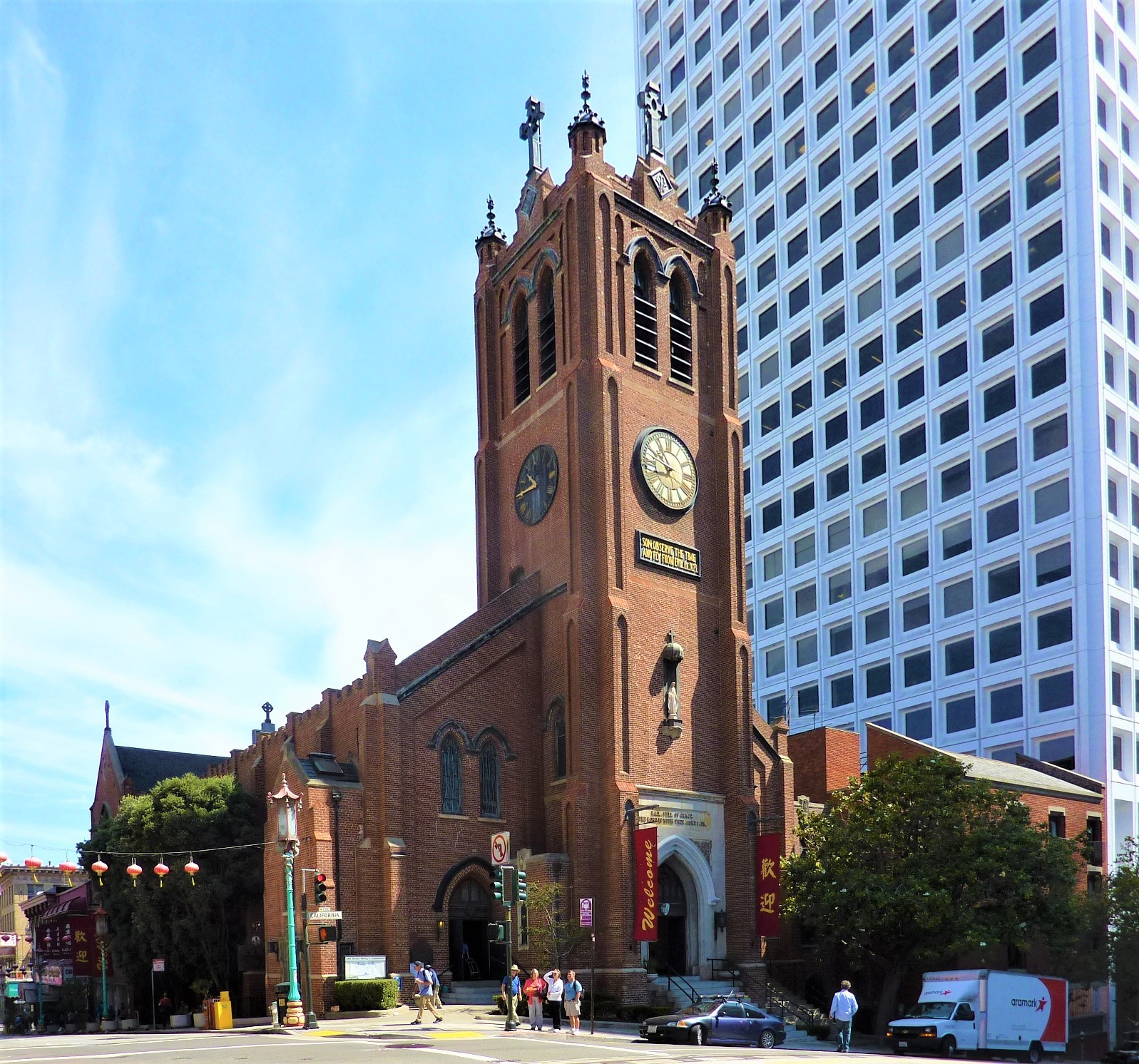

Religion
- Affiliation: Roman Catholic Church
- Province: Archdiocese of San Francisco
- Ecclesiastical or organisational status: Proto-cathedral; parish
- Leadership: Archbishop of San Francisco, Paulist Fathers

Location
- Location: 660 California Street; San Francisco, California
- Interactive map of Old Saint Mary's Cathedral
- Coordinates: 37.79265°N 122.40575°W

Architecture
- Architects: Craine & England (1853-54); Welsh & Carey (1908-09)
- Style: Gothic Revival
- Groundbreaking: 1853
- Completed: 1854
- Direction of façade: South
- California Historical Landmark
- Reference no.: 810
- San Francisco Designated Landmark
- Reference no.: 2

Website
- www.oldsaintmarys.org

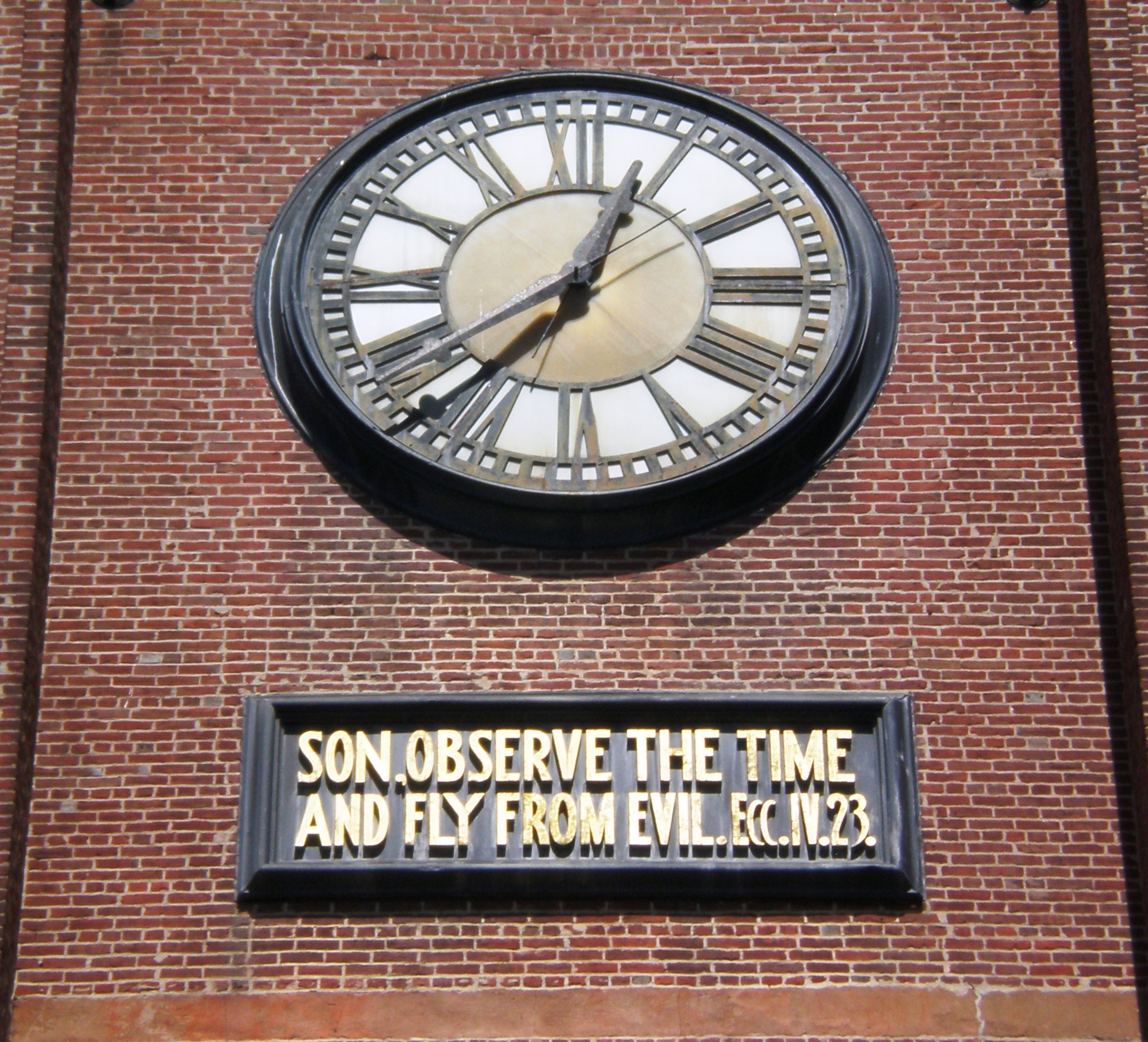
The cathedral's clock and the admonitory phrase beneath it

The Old Cathedral of St. Mary of the Immaculate Conception is a proto-cathedral and Catholic parish on California Street at Grant Avenue in the Chinatown neighborhood of San Francisco, California. It was built in 1854 in the Gothic Revival style, and was made a Designated San Francisco Landmark on April 11, 1968.

== History ==
Old St. Mary's was established, as a mission, by Paulist Father Henry Ignatius Stark, C.S.P. The cornerstone was placed on Sunday, July 17, 1853, at the corner of California and Dupont Streets by the Bishop of Monterrey Joseph S. Alemany, built by Chinese laborers, with brick brought around Cape Horn, and granite cut in China. With its dedication by Alemany, now as the new Archbishop of San Francisco, at Christmas Midnight Mass, 1854, it became the first cathedral of the Archdiocese of San Francisco. The building was designed in the Gothic Revival style by William Craine and Thomas England, two of the earliest resident architects in California. St. Mary's is the first cathedral in California to be built for the express purpose of serving as a cathedral, although other churches in the state served as cathedrals before it was built. When it opened, it was the tallest building in San Francisco and all of California.

It was used from 1854 to 1891 as a cathedral and was replaced by the first Cathedral of Saint Mary of the Assumption, as the archdiocese was in need of a larger space for the growing number of Catholics in the area. In 1891, Old Saint Mary's became a parish church, still using the same name that it bore as a cathedral. The new St. Mary's Cathedral was located at Van Ness Avenue and O'Farrell Street.

Under the clock face of Old St. Mary's appear the words: "Son, observe the time and fly from evil" (Ecclesiasticus 4:23). This sentiment was aimed at the men who frequented the surrounding brothels in the 1850s.

It was across the street from Old St. Mary's, at the southeast corner of California and Dupont streets (the latter being the current Grant Avenue), that Emperor Norton collapsed in 1880, on his way to a lecture at the California Academy of Sciences.

Old St. Mary's survived the 1906 San Francisco earthquake, only to be gutted a day later by the fires started by the earthquake. The fires were so hot that they melted the church bells and marble altar. Only the exterior brick walls and the bell tower remained. The renovation of the church was completed in 1909, supervised by architects Welsh & Carey. Dupont Street, with its association with the Barbary Coast and Chinatown, was renamed Grant Avenue, a respectful nod to former president and general Ulysses S. Grant.

The church further expanded and built an auditorium, a library and a lecture room and then used that space to host events for the servicemen and women of World War II.

Old St. Mary's remains an active parish of the archdiocese, serving the Chinatown and Nob Hill communities of San Francisco. Old St. Mary's Church is a California Historical Landmark. The Paulist Fathers have served Old Saint Mary's since 1901, and continue serving there today. The church was made a Designated San Francisco Landmark on April 11, 1968.

From 2011 to 2012, the church went through further renovations, during which time all the crosses on the roof were removed as it was restored. While the four crosses along the sides were put back up, as of September 2012 the cross in the middle has not returned.

== Rectors ==
Rectors of St. Mary's Cathedral 1854–1891:

- Rev. Hugh P. Gallagher 1854–1860
- Rev. James Croke 1860–1871
- Rev. John J. Prendergast 1871–1891

== See also ==
- List of Catholic cathedrals in the United States
- List of cathedrals in the United States
- List of San Francisco Designated Landmarks
