= Philip van Ness Myers =

American historian

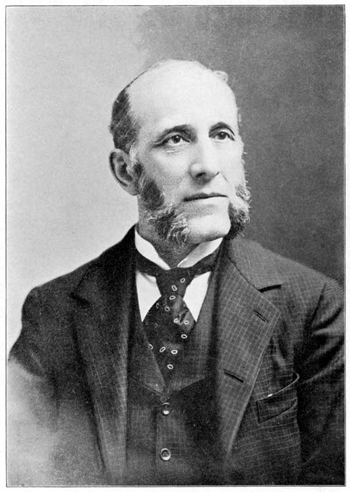
Philip van Ness Myers, ca. 1895

Philip van Ness Myers (August 10, 1846 − September 17, 1937) was an American historian who was Professor of Economics and History at the University of Cincinnati and an author of several notable works on history.

== Biography ==
Philip van Ness Myers was born in Tribes Hill, New York on August 10, 1846. He attended Gilmore Academy at Ballston Spa, New York, and graduated from Williams College in 1871. From 1873 and 1874 Myers studied law at Yale University and took graduate a graduate course in economics.

In 1872, Myers joined a scientific mission to Europe, Middle East and India. Myers was accompanied on this journey by his older brother Henry Morris Myers (1842–1872), who died while they returning from India. He is buried in Ceylon. The product of his travels were the two books, Life and Nature Under the Tropics from his previous expedition to South America 1867 also with his older brother, and Remains of Lost Empires. These works won him widespread acclaim, and won him a master's degree from Williams College.

In 1879, Myers went to Cincinnati to become President of Farmer's College on College Hill, a famous Ohio educational institution whose graduates included John Morgan Walden, Murat Halstead and Benjamin Harrison.

Myers led Farmer's College until 1890, when he was appointed Professor of Economics and History at the University of Cincinnati. He managed to continue his work as a historian, publishing his Ancient History in 1882, and his Mediaeval and Modern History and General History in 1889. In the latter work Myers condensed into a single volume the history of humanity from the dawn of time up to the present. General History won him wide acclaim and established his fame as an authority on history. It was translated into a number of foreign languages, including Chinese and Arabic. Myers was an early and vigorous advocate of the theory of evolution. Although this was a cause of bitter criticism from his peers, Myers held on to his convictions. He nevertheless remained on friendly terms with leaders of the church.

For the next ten years, Myers remained at the University of Cincinnati, serving as dean of the academic faculty for three years. In the meantime he published his works Eastern Nations and Greece (1890), History of Rome (1890), History of Greece (1897), and Rome, Its Rise and Fall (1900). Since his retirement, Myers published his works The Middle Age, The Modern Age, and History as Past Ethics.

A vigorous critic of the German occupation of Belgium during World War I, Myers was awarded the King Albert Medal by Albert I of Belgium when the latter visited the United States in 1919.

Myers was a member of the American Historical Association for more than 30 years, and was the recipient of honorary academic degrees from Yale University, the University of Cincinnati and Belmont College.

Myers died in Cincinnati on 17 September 1937. Upon his death, the Cincinnati Enquirer noted that "his historical narratives have been studied by probably more high school and college students than similar works of any one man." Myers was survived by his wife Ida Cornelia Miller, whom he had married on July 20, 1876.
