= Cathedral of Saint Mary of the Assumption (San Francisco) =

Principal church of the Archdiocese of San Francisco, California

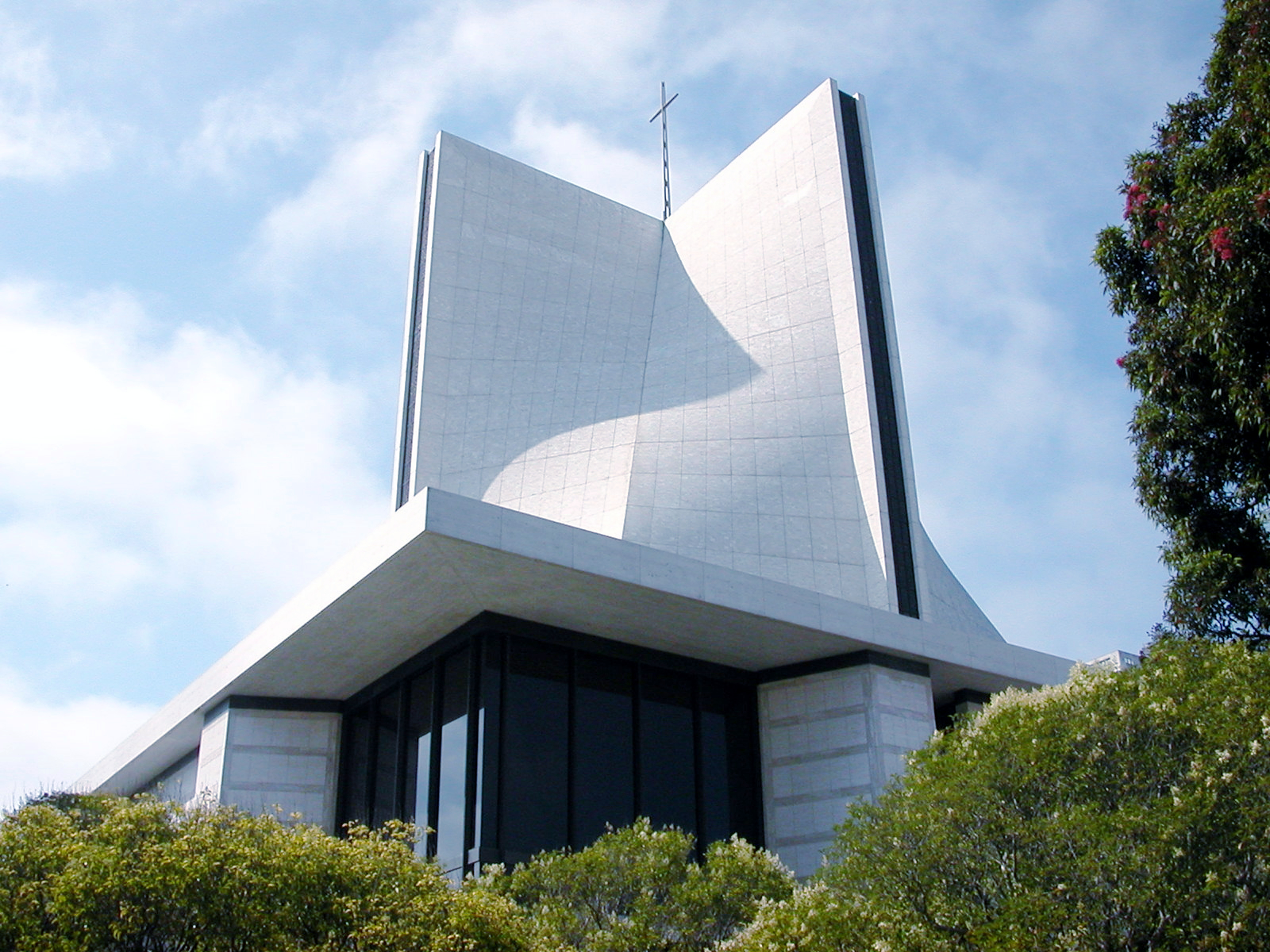
- Cathedral from the DePaul Campus of Sacred Heart Cathedral Preparatory

- Location in California
- 37°47′03″N 122°25′32″W
- Location: 1111 Gough St. San Francisco, California, 94109
- Country: United States
- Denomination: Catholic Church
- Sui iuris church: Latin Church
- Website: www.smcsf.org

History
- Founded: 1891
- Dedication: October 5, 1996

Architecture
- Architect(s): Pier Luigi Nervi, Pietro Belluschi, John Michael Lee, Paul A. Ryan and Angus McSweeney
- Style: Structural Expressionist Modern
- Groundbreaking: 1967
- Completed: 1971

Specifications
- Capacity: 2,400 seats

Administration
- Diocese: Archdiocese of San Francisco

Clergy
- Archbishop: Salvatore Cordileone
- Rector: Kevin Kennedy

The Cathedral of Saint Mary of the Assumption, also known locally as Saint Mary's Cathedral, is the principal church of the Archdiocese of San Francisco in San Francisco, California, United States. It is the mother church of the Catholic faithful in the California counties of Marin, San Francisco and San Mateo and is the metropolitan cathedral for the Ecclesiastical province of San Francisco.

San Francisco has had three cathedrals. The third and present Saint Mary's Cathedral, completed in 1970, is located in the Cathedral Hill neighborhood. It replaced the second Saint Mary's Cathedral, built in 1891 and destroyed by fire in 1962. The first Saint Mary's Cathedral served the community from 1854 to 1891 and is known today as Old Saint Mary's Cathedral.

== History ==
=== First Saint Mary's Cathedral ===
In 1853, Pope Pius IX erected the Archdiocese of San Francisco, a massive diocese stretching from Northern California east to the Colorado River. The pope appointed Bishop Joseph Sadoc Alemany as its first archbishop.

Reverend Henry Ignatius Stark established Saint Mary's Parish in 1853 in the Chinatown section of San Francisco. His intention was to evangelize the Chinese community. However, with the creation of the archdiocese, Alemany decided that the new church should become the cathedral for the new archdiocese. He laid the cornerstone for Saint Mary's that same year. Chinese laborers constructed the church using with brick brought around Cape Horn and granite cut in China. Alemany consecrated the first Saint Mary's Cathedral on December 24, 1854. When it opened, the cathedral was the tallest and largest building in the city.

=== Second Saint Mary's Cathedral ===
By the early 1880s, the rapid population growth in the San Francisco Bay Area prompted the archdiocese to plan for a new cathedral. In 1883, Archbishop Patrick W. Riordan purchased a property on the corner of Van Ness Avenue and O'Farrell Street in the Western Addition section of the city. Riordan broke ground for the new cathedral in December 1885 and in May 1887 laid the cornerstone for the building. Riordan dedicated the second Saint Mary's Cathedral in January 1891.

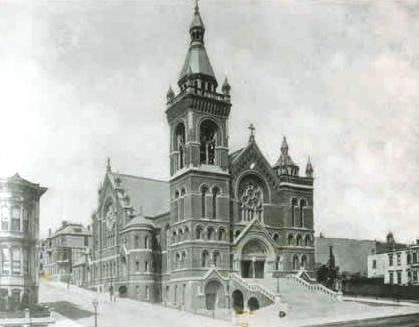
The second Saint Mary's Cathedral

In 1936, the papal secretary of state, Cardinal Eugenio Pacelli, celebrated mass in the cathedral. He would be elected Pope Pius XII three years later. On September 7, 1962, 40 teenagers were attending a late evening event at the cathedral when a fire was discovered. They were all escorted out safely. A priest went inside to rescue the Eucharist, but was driven out by flames and smoke. The fire, suspected to be arson, caused $2.5 million worth of damage to the structure, which could not be saved.

=== Third Saint Mary's Cathedral ===
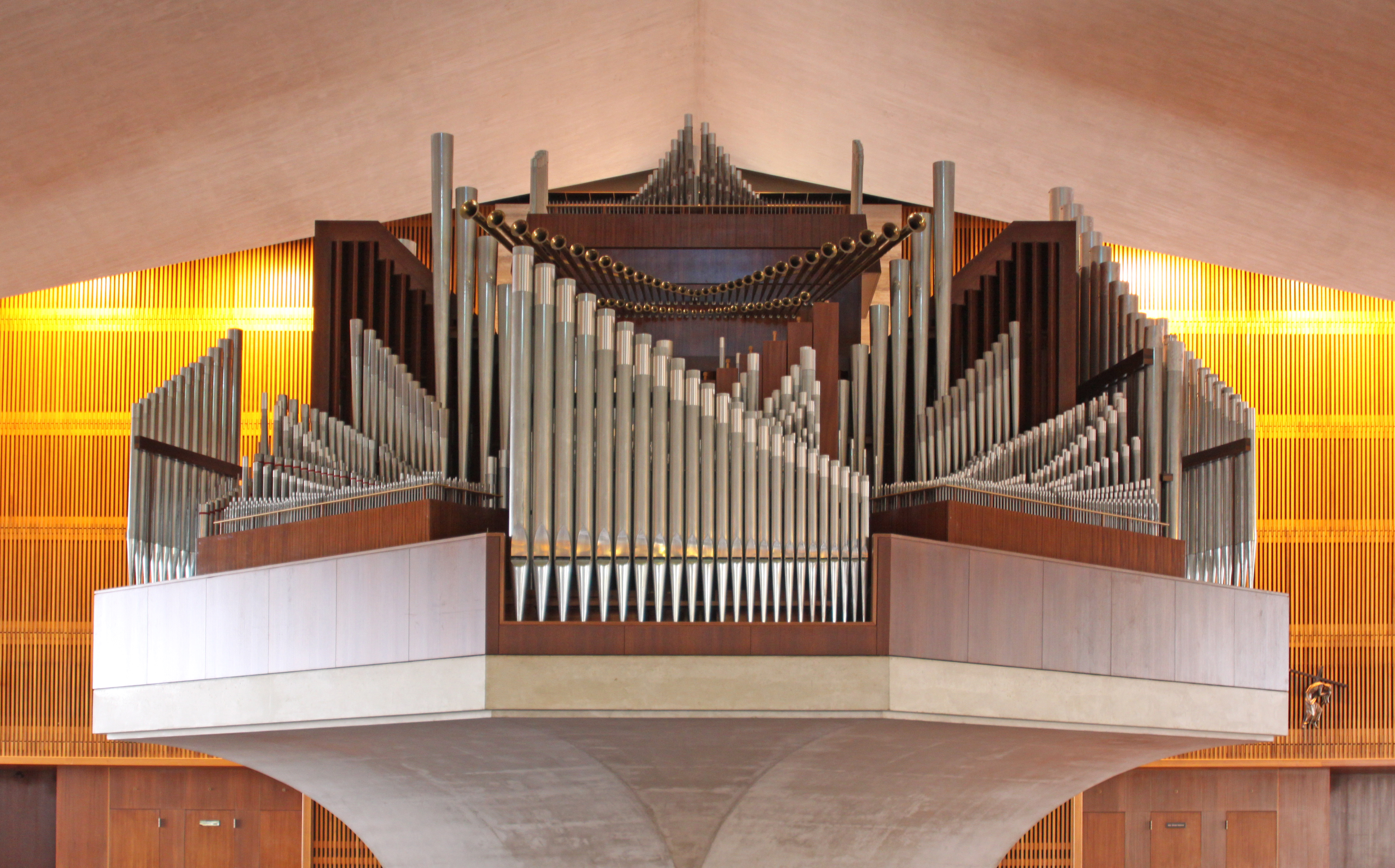
Pipe organ, Saint Mary's Cathedral (2013)

The cornerstone for the third and present Saint Mary's Cathedral was laid on December 13, 1967, and the cathedral was completed three years later. On May 5, 1971, the cathedral was consecrated. It cost $9 million.

In 1987, during a papal visit to California, Pope John Paul II celebrated a papal mass in the cathedral. In 2011, a 2.7 ton brass bell was stolen from the cathedral grounds. Over 122 years old, the bell had been installed in the bell tower of the second Saint Mary's Cathedral until it was destroyed by fire in 1962. It was later placed on a platform outside the present cathedral. The bell was never recovered.

In 2015, the media reported that the cathedral staff had installed sprinklers at some of the outside alcoves of the cathedral to discourage homeless people from sleeping there. Bishop William Justice apologized to the community and the sprinklers were removed.

It ran the private all-female Cathedral High School, in a building adjoining the present-day cathedral. CHS merged with nearby all-male private Sacred Heart High School in 1987. Saint Mary's Cathedral still has close ties to the resulting Sacred Heart Cathedral Preparatory, which uses the cathedral as its principal church for masses and other special events, such as graduation.

== Design and construction ==
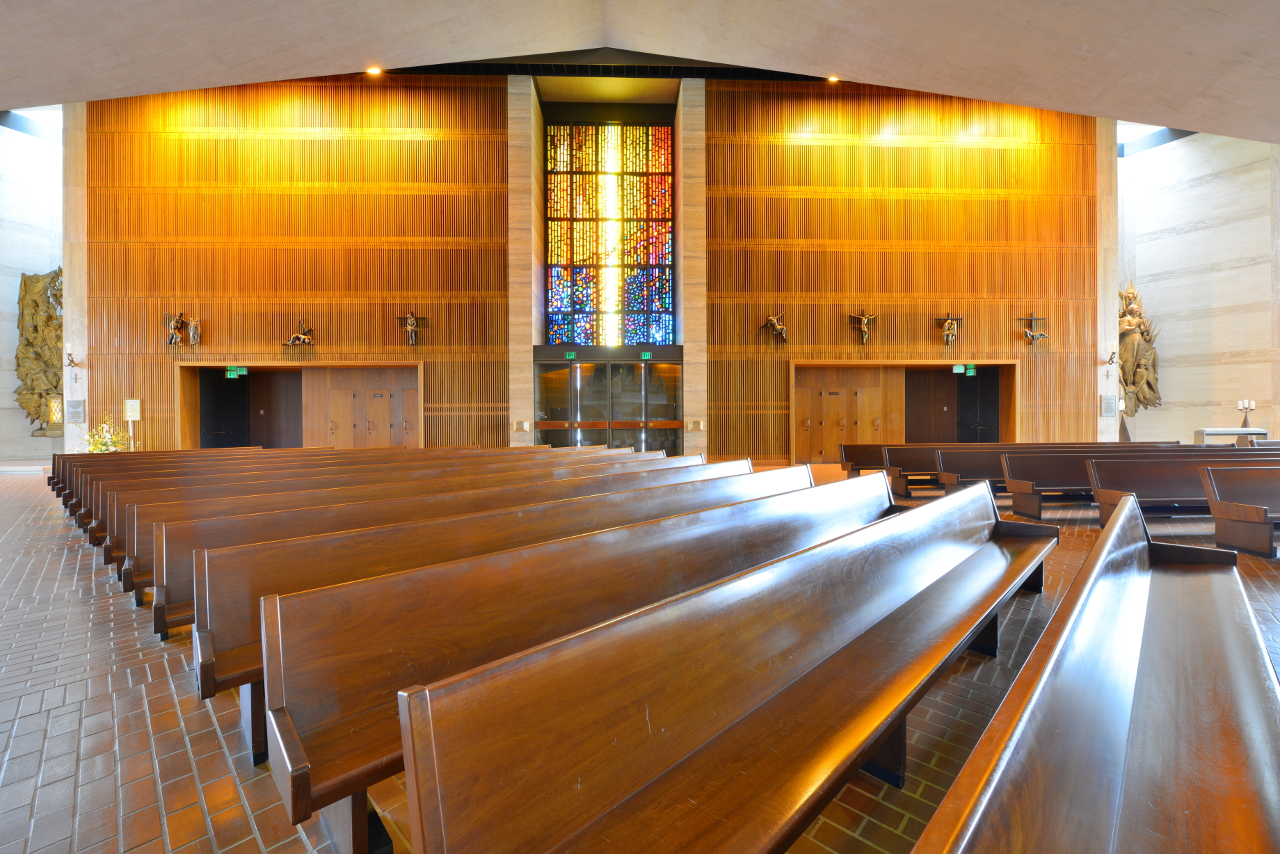
Nave, Saint Mary's Cathedral (2013)

The original design team in the early 1960s for the third Saint Mary's Cathedral was the architects John Michael Lee, Paul A. Ryan and Angus McSweeney of San Francisco. Archbishop Joseph Thomas McGucken told them that he envisioned:

...a cathedral that would accommodate large numbers of people; one that would enable even large crowds to surround the altar; and a structure that would be a statement that God is present in beauty in the earthly city.

However, the options that the architects originally presented received negative feedback. The archdiocese then added the Italian architect Pier Luigi Nervi and the American architect Pietro Belluschi to the design team. The archdiocese approved the modernistic design, but some architectural critics accused the architects of plagiarizing the design of the new Saint Mary's Cathedral in Tokyo, Japan.

Many Catholics in the archdiocese disliked the cathedral's modernist design. Some called it "Our Lady of Perpetual Agitation" or "Our Lady of Maytag" because the roof (designed to look like a conquistador's helmet) resembled the agitator in a washing machine.

Measuring 255 feet (78 m) square, Saint Mary's Cathedral is 190 feet (58 m) high and is crowned with a 55 feet (17 m) golden cross. Its saddle roof is composed of eight segments of hyperbolic paraboloids. The bottom horizontal cross section of the roof is a square and the top cross section is a cross. Precast concrete work, the entire top portion of the building, was constructed by Terracon and the DiRegolo Family of Hayward, California.

Saint Mary's Cathedral was selected in 2007 by the local chapter of the American Institute of Architects for a list of San Francisco's top 25 buildings. In 2017, Architectural Digest named it one of the ten most beautiful churches in the United States.

== Cathedral rectors and administrators (1891 to present) ==
- John J. Prendergast, vicar general, 1891 – 1913
- Charles Augustus Ramm, 1914 – 1948
- Hugh Aloysius Donohoe, vicar general, 1948 – 1962
- Thomas J. Bowe, 1962 – 1980
- J. O’Shaughnessy, administrator, 1979 – 1981, rector 1981 – 1986
- Patrick Joseph McGrath, 1986 – 1989
- Milton T. Walsh, 1989 – 1997
- John O’Connor, 1997 – 2002
- Angel Jose De Heredia, administrator, 2002 – 2003
- John Talesfore, 2005 – 2015
- William J. Justice, administrator, 2015
- Arturo Albano, 2015 – 2022
- Kevin Kennedy, 2022 – present

== Interior photos ==
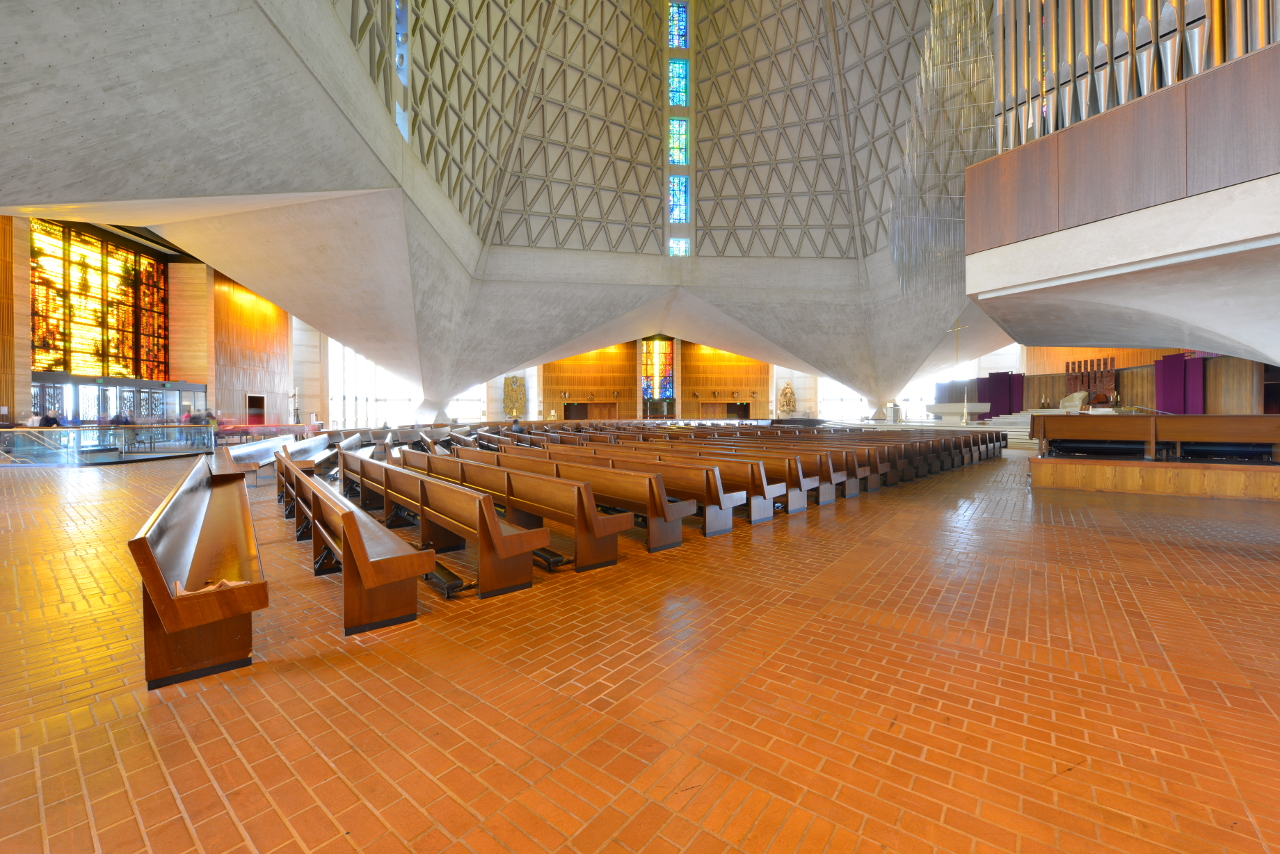

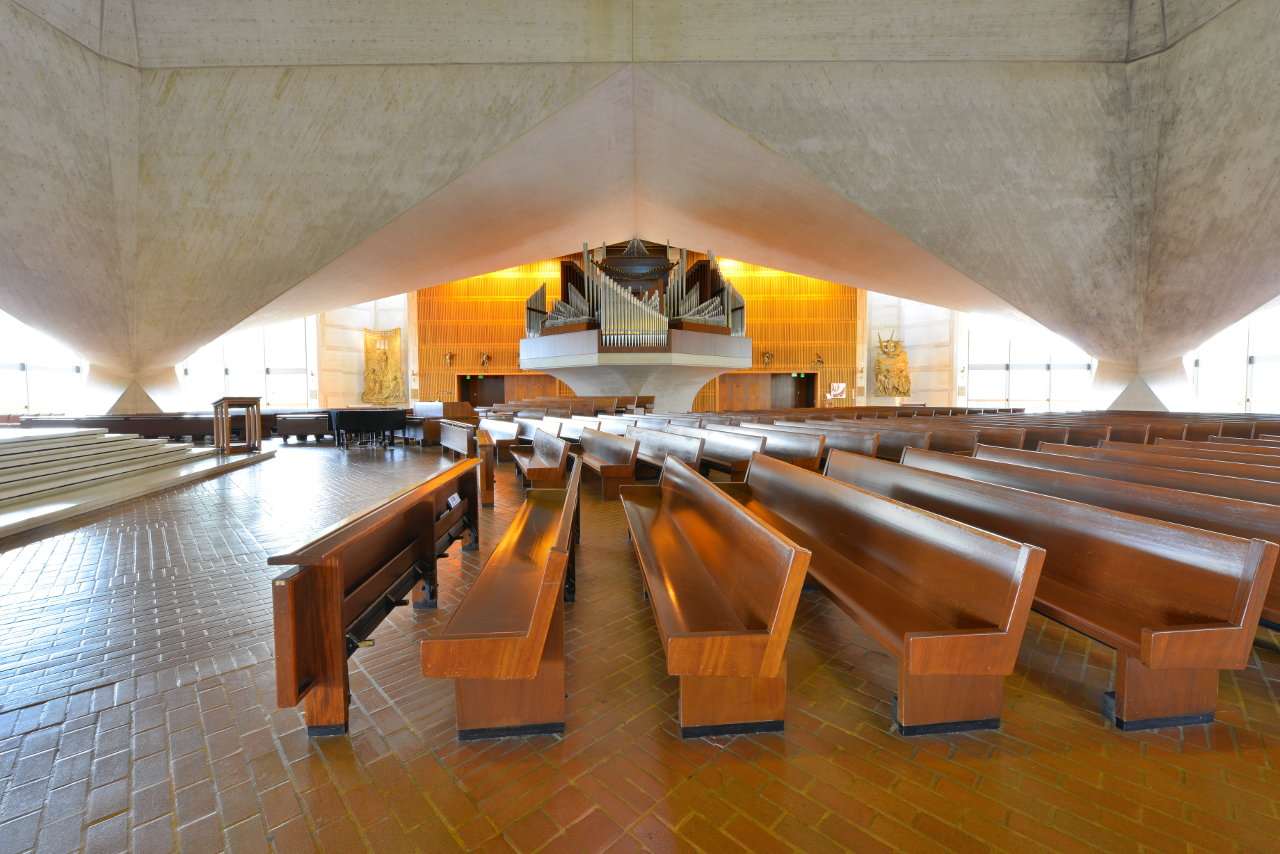

== See also ==
- List of Catholic cathedrals in the United States
- List of cathedrals in the United States
- Roman Catholic Marian churches
