= Archdiocese of San Francisco =

Latin Church ecclesiastical territory of the Catholic Church in California

Coordinates: 37°47′08″N 122°25′27″W

Archdiocese of San Francisco Archidiœcesis Sancti Francisci Arquidiócesis de San Francisco 舊金山總教區
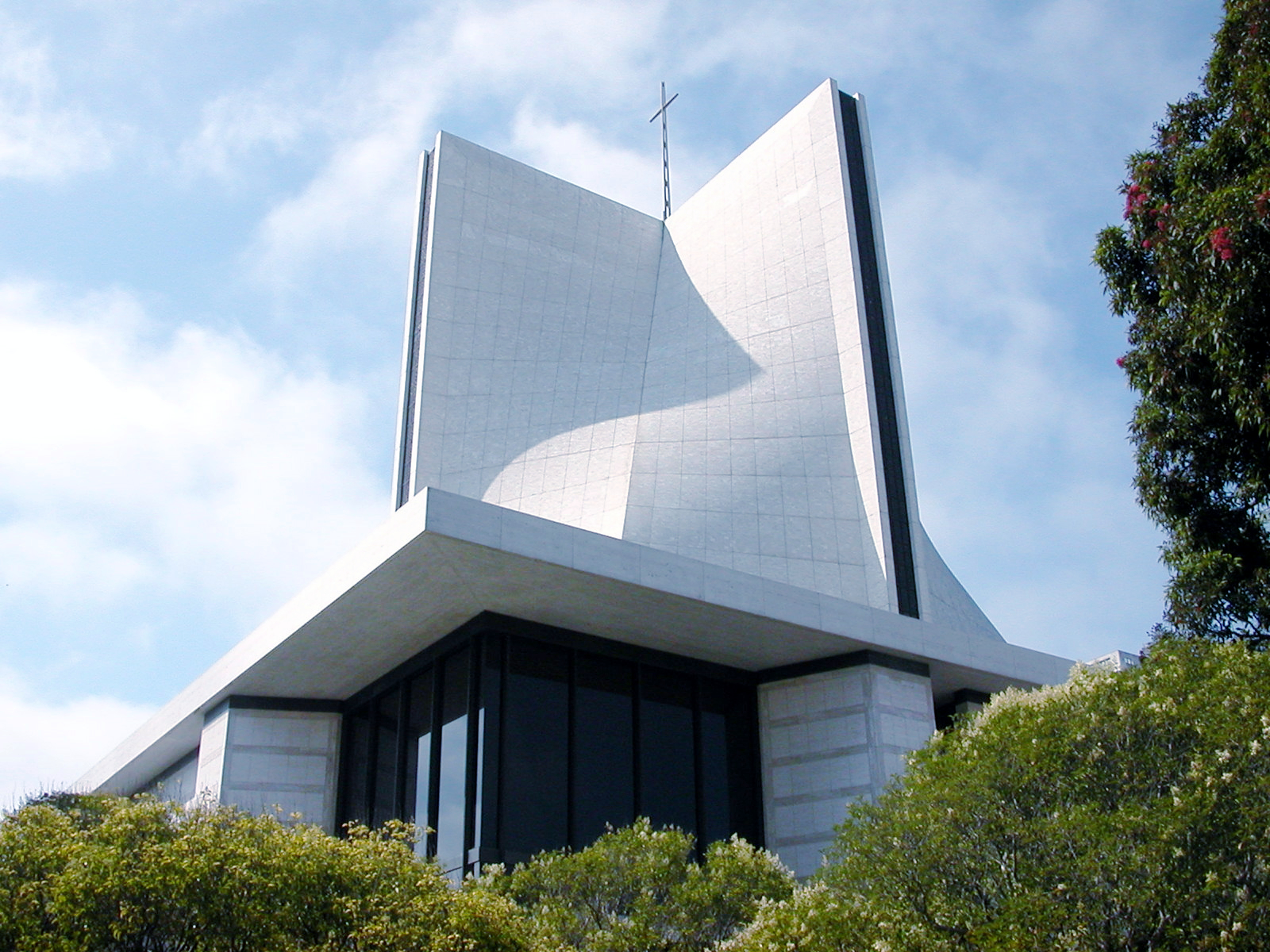
- Cathedral of Saint Mary of the Assumption

- Coat of arms

Location
- Country: United States
- Territory: Counties of San Francisco, San Mateo, Marin
- Ecclesiastical province: Province of San Francisco

Statistics
- Area: 6,023 km^{2} (2,325 sq mi)
- Population: Total; Catholics: (as of 2020); 1,918,620; 477,120 (24.9%)

Information
- Denomination: Catholic
- Sui iuris church: Latin Church
- Rite: Roman Rite
- Established: July 29, 1853; 173 years ago
- Cathedral: Cathedral of Saint Mary of the Assumption
- Co-cathedral: Old Saint Mary's Cathedral
- Patron saint: Saint Francis of Assisi (Primary); Saint Patrick, Saint Joseph (Secondary)

Current leadership
- Pope: Leo XIV
- Archbishop: Salvatore Cordileone
- Vicar General: Patrick J. Summerhays & Stephen H. Howell
- Judicial Vicar: Armando Gutierrez
- Bishops emeritus: Ignatius C. Wang; William J. Justice

Map
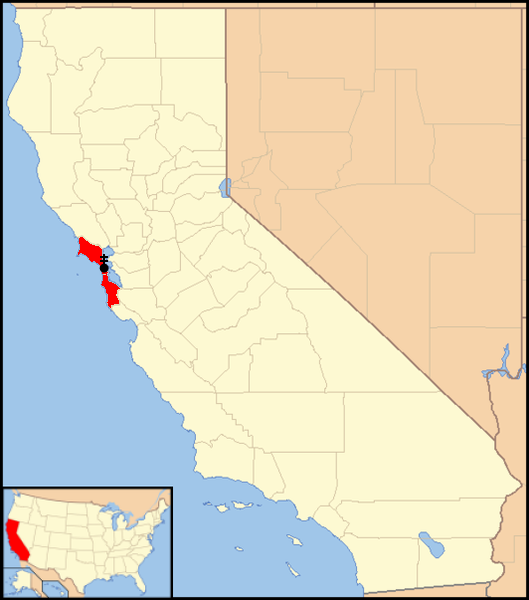

Website
- sfarchdiocese.org

The Archdiocese of San Francisco (Latin: Archdiœcesis Sancti Francisci; Spanish: Arquidiócesis de San Francisco) is a diocese of the Catholic Church in the northern California region of the United States. It was erected in 1853. Its cathedral is the Cathedral of Saint Mary of the Assumption.

== Territory ==
The Archdiocese of San Francisco covers San Francisco, Marin County, and San Mateo County. It is the metropolitan see of a province that includes the following suffragan dioceses:

- Diocese of Honolulu
- Diocese of Oakland
- Diocese of San Jose
- Diocese of Santa Rosa
- Diocese of Sacramento
- Diocese of Stockton

== History ==
=== 1776 to 1853 ===
The first Catholic church in the Archdiocese of San Francisco is older than the archdiocese itself; Mission San Francisco de Asís (Mission Dolores) was founded in 1776 by Franciscan Friars. The friars built the current mission building in 1791.

After the end of the Mexican–American War in 1848, California and the Intermountain West became part of the United States. The Vatican erected the new Diocese of Monterey in 1849 to remove these areas from the jurisdiction of the Mexican Catholic hierarchy. The new diocese covered the California Territory east to the Colorado River. St. Francis of Assisi Parish was founded in San Francisco in 1849 and St. Patrick Parish in the city in 1851. In 1850, the Province of the Most Holy Name of Jesus, the western province for the Dominican Order in the United States, was established in San Francisco.

=== 1853 to 1884 ===
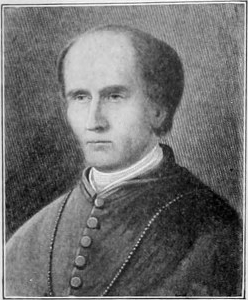
Archbishop Alemany (1913)

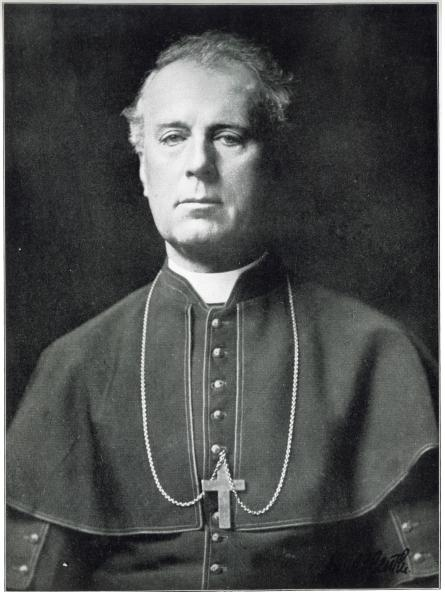
Archbishop Riordan (1920s)

In 1853, the Vatican erected the Archdiocese of San Francisco. Its jurisdiction extended to northern and central California, along with present-day Nevada and Utah. Pope Pius IX named Bishop Joseph Sadoc Alemany of Monterey as the first archbishop of San Francisco. Old St. Mary's Cathedral on California Street was dedicated in 1854. In 1855, the Society of Jesus founded St. Ignatius Academy in San Francisco, the forerunner of the University of San Francisco. Alemany founded Saint Mary's College in Moraga in 1863, then turned its operation over to the De La Salle Christian Brothers in 1868.

As archbishop of San Francisco, Alemany presided over a multinational archdiocese, owing to the influx of people to California during the California Gold Rush. He established parishes for the city's Italian, Irish, French, German and Mexican communities. In 1883, Bishop Patrick Riordan from the Diocese of Chicago was appointed as coadjutor archbishop by Pope Leo XIII to assist Alemany. In May 1883, Alemany purchased land in San Francisco for a larger cathedral to serve the growing Catholic population.

When Alemany retired in 1884, Riordan automatically succeeded him as archbishop. In 1884, Riordan's first full year in San Francisco, the archdiocese contained 175 priests, 128 churches, and 25 chapels and stations to serve a Catholic population of 200,000. Riordan laid the cornerstone in 1887 and dedicated the new Cathedral of St. Mary of the Assumption in 1891.

=== 1884 to 1914 ===
In early 1894, Riordan protested against the use of Outlines of Mediæval and Modern History by the historian Philip van Ness Myers in San Francisco's public schools. He denounced the book as anti-Catholic and declared that it was "utterly unfit for use in a school patronized by children of various creeds." In April 1894, the San Francisco Board of Education ruled that Outlines would still be used, but allowed teachers to omit any passages that might "appear in any way to favor or to reflect on the particular doctrines or tenets of any religious sect."

In 1906, the San Francisco earthquake caused $2 to $6 million in damages to over 12 churches and other institutions in the archdiocese. Riordan celebrated open-air masses for his displaced parishioners, who were living amidst the ruins in temporary shelters, and assured them, "We shall rebuild." Riordan temporarily moved to San Mateo, allowing the Presentation Sisters, who had lost their convent, to use the archbishop's residence. Every church that had been destroyed had a temporary structure within two years and was rebuilt within another eight years. By the time of Riordan's death in 1914, the archdiocese had 367 priests, 182 churches, 94 chapels and stations, and 94 parochial schools for 280,000 Catholics. Many of the new parishes under his administration were established for immigrant communities.

=== 1914 to 1962 ===
Riordan was succeeded as archbishop of San Francisco by Auxiliary Bishop Edward Hanna of San Francisco, appointed by Pope Benedict XV in 1915. The rebuilding of the Mission Dolores Church after its destruction in the 1906 earthquake was completed in 1918. In 1921, Hanna was named chairman of San Francisco's wage arbitration boards; Hanna served on the boards through 1924. Hanna was key to the 1924 opening of St. Joseph's Seminary in Mountain View. In 1932, Pope Pius XI appointed Bishop John Mitty of the Diocese of Salt Lake as coadjutor archbishop to assist Hanna.

Hanna was appointed in 1933 as the chairman of a state mediation board to resolve the cotton strike in Corcoran. During the 1934 West Coast waterfront strike, President Franklin Roosevelt named Hanna the chairman of the National Longshoremen's Board. The board was tasked with resolving the strike by mediating between the International Longshoremen's Association, the International Seamen's Union, and their employers.

When Hanna retired in 1935, Mitty automatically succeeded him as archbishop of San Francisco. Mitty's first act as archbishop was to direct his installation gift from the clergy to restoring Saint Patrick Seminary in Menlo Park. He purchased St. Mary's College of California from the De La Salle Christian Brothers in 1937, and reopened it in 1938. In the twenty six years of his episcopate, 84 parishes and missions were founded in the archdiocese, and over 500 building projects were completed. Mitty caused controversy in 1944 when he called for a boycott of the San Francisco News. The newspaper had reported on the DWI arrest of one of his priests; Mitty called the coverage anti-Catholic. In 1952, the Vatican elevated the Mission Dolores Church to a basilica. Mitty died in 1961.

=== 1962 to 1983 ===
Pope John XXIII named Bishop Joseph McGucken from the Diocese of Sacramento as the next archbishop of San Francisco in 1962. That same year, an arson fire destroyed the Cathedral of St. Mary of the Assumption. The cornerstone for the new cathedral was laid in 1967 and the building was completed in 1970.

In 1968, McGucken became embroiled in a controversy with Eugene Boyle, a progressive diocesan priest with ties to the Black Panther Party. Rumors spread that the Black Panthers were distributing a coloring book to children that advocated violence against police officers. Boyle said that he blocked its distribution. To appease public outrage over Boyle's defense of the Black Panthers, McGucken cancelled a yearly seminar that Boyle was slated to deliver. In December 1968, the senate ruled that McGucken should reinstate Boyle's seminar.

After McGucken retired in 1977, Pope Paul VI named Archbishop John R. Quinn of the Archdiocese of Oklahoma City as the next archbishop of San Francisco. In 1981, at Quinn's request, the Vatican erected the Diocese of San Jose, taking its territory from the archdiocese.

=== 1983 to 2012 ===
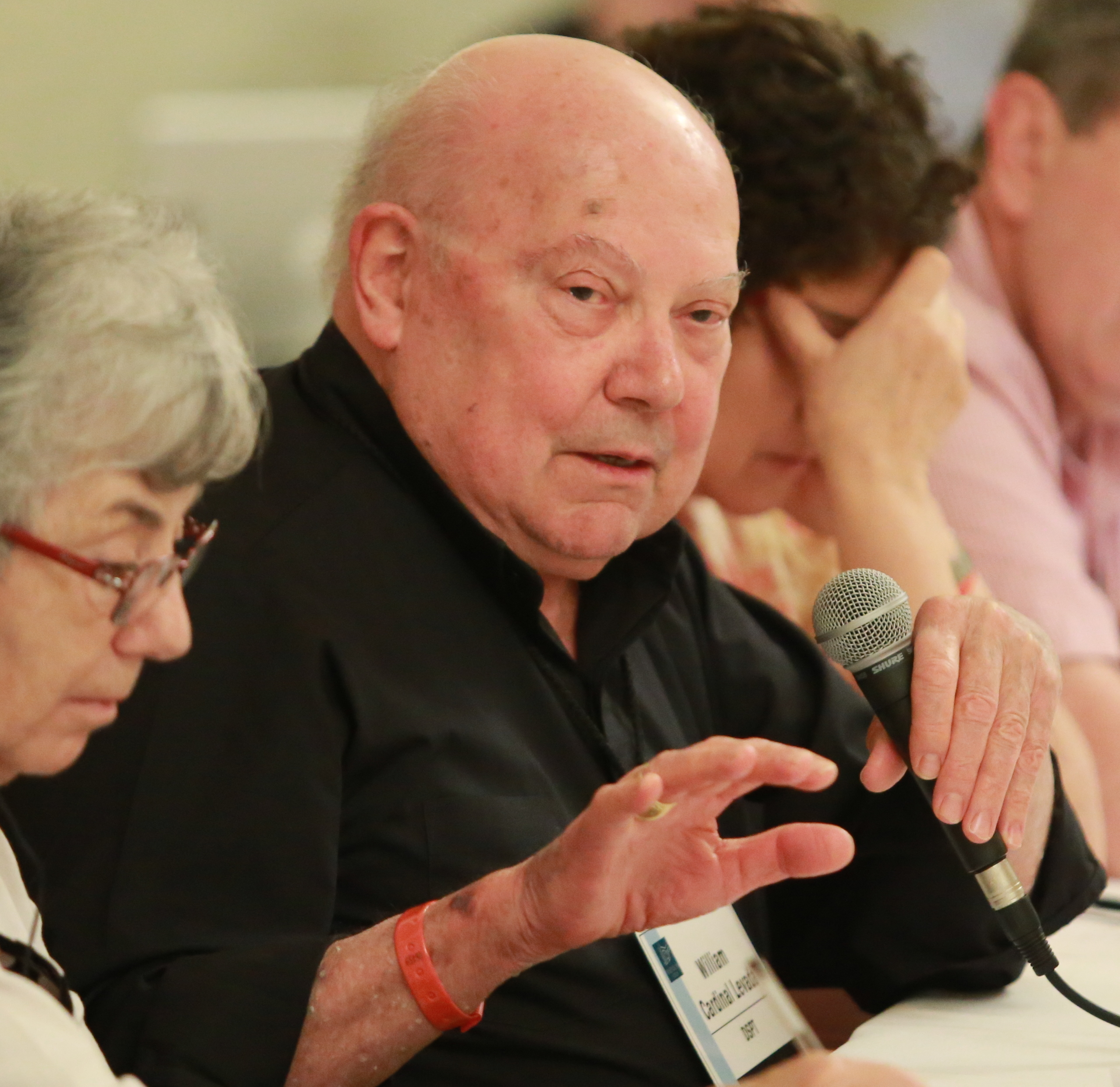
Archbishop Levada (2015)

Quinn reached out to gay Catholics in the archdiocese as early as 1983. He issued a document that asked priests to take concerns of gay people seriously. In it, he said he wanted gay Catholics to find "a church where he or she will find acceptance, understanding, and love." He supported the efforts of Most Holy Redeemer Parish in the Castro district in their efforts to reach out to the LGBTQ+ population of the neighborhood.

Quinn regularly visited this parish, especially during the annual 40 Hours Vigil held throughout the 1980s in support of those who were HIV-positive and their caregivers. In 1985, Quinn initiated the Catholic Church's first institutional response to the HIV/AIDS epidemic. When Pope John Paul II visited San Francisco in 1987, Quinn arranged for him to meet with several HIV/AIDS patients, including a young boy.

The damage caused by the 1989 Loma Prieta earthquake prompted the archdiocese to close a dozen parishes with severely damaged buildings. 41 priests signed a dissenting petition. Quinn sold the former archiepiscopal residence and in 1992 moved into the cathedral rectory, where he lived with fellow clergy until his retirement. In August 1995, Archbishop William Levada from the Archdiocese of Portland was appointed coadjutor archbishop of San Francisco to assist Quinn.

When Quinn retired in December 1995, Levada succeeded him. In 1996, Patrick O'Shea, a former advisor to Quinn, was charged with embezzling over $260,000 in donations from the archdiocese. In 2004, O'Shea pleaded guilty and was sentenced to time served in prison for molestation charges and ordered to pay $187,000 back to the archdiocese. In 2005, Pope Benedict XVI named Levada as prefect of the Congregation for the Doctrine of the Faith in Rome. To replace Levada In San Francisco, the pope named Bishop George Niederauer of Salt Lake City.

=== 2012 to present ===
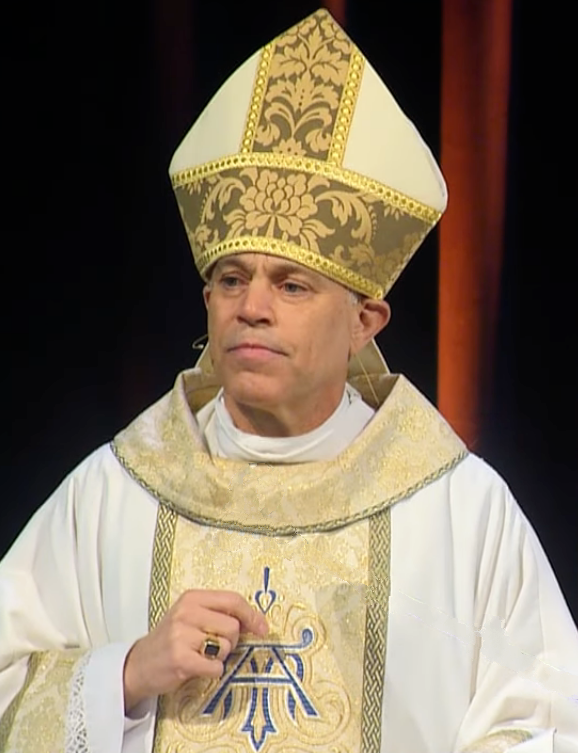
Archbishop Cordileone (2016)

In 2012, Benedict XVI appointed Bishop Salvatore J. Cordileone from the Diocese of Oakland as the next archbishop of San Francisco, replacing the retired Niederauer. In February 2015, Cordileone told teachers in the archdiocesan school system that they were expected to conduct their public lives in a way that does not undermine or deny the church's doctrine. Democratic California State Assemblymen Phil Ting of San Francisco and Kevin Mullin of San Mateo sent a letter to Cordileone urging him to withdraw what they called "discriminatory morality clauses." The letter was signed by lawmakers from each community in the archdiocese with a Catholic high school. Cordileone responded, saying he "respects the lawmakers' right to hire whoever [sic] may advance their mission and that he is asking for the same respect." Ting and Mulin called for an investigation of working conditions at archdiocesan high schools over the archbishop's proposed morality clauses for teachers.

In April 2015, more than 100 Catholic donors and church members from the Bay Area signed a full-page advertisement in the San Francisco Chronicle appealing to Pope Francis to replace Cordileone. The signers objected to Cordileone's characterization of extramarital sex and LBGTQ+ relationships as "gravely evil," saying that Cordileone fostered "an atmosphere of division and intolerance." The archdiocese responded that the advertisement was a "misrepresentation of the spirit of the archbishop" and that it was also a misrepresentation to suggest that the signers spoke for the entire Catholic community in the Bay Area. The archdiocese claimed to have received over 7,500 letters of support. A subsequent picnic to show support for Cordileone was held in May 2015 in San Francisco. In 2019, the archdiocese provided documents to California State Attorney Xavier Becerra in preparation for lawsuits after the statute of limitations on sexual abuse allegations was temporarily removed in 2020. In August 2023, the archdiocese filed a petition under Chapter 11, Title 11, United States Code in the San Francisco County Superior Court after confirming that it was unable to financially resolve the estimated 500 sex abuse lawsuits.

Hundreds of students at Archbishop Riordan High School in San Francisco staged a walkout in November 2021 rather than attend an assembly featuring Megan Almon, a spokesperson for an anti-abortion group. In April 2022, Cordileone warned Nancy Pelosi, the Speaker of the U.S. House of Representatives and a San Francisco resident, that he would prohibit her from receiving the eucharist unless she repudiated her promotion of abortion legalization. In May 2022, Cordileone notified her and publicly announced that he took that action.

Pope Francis erected the Archdiocese of Las Vegas in May 2023, suppressing the Diocese of Las Vegas that had been a suffragan diocese of the Archdiocese of San Francisco. The dioceses of Reno and Salt Lake City then became suffragan dioceses of the new archdiocese.

In April 2024, a man was arrested after stabbing a parishioner outside of Sts. Peter and Paul Church in San Francisco. Cordileone was conducting a confirmation ceremony in the church when the assailant wandered in. After several parishioners escorted him out of the church, the man stabbed one of them. The person's wound was not serious.

== Bishops ==
=== Archbishops of San Francisco ===
1. Joseph Sadoc Alemany y Conill, O.P. (1853–1884)
2. Patrick William Riordan (1884–1914; Coadjutor Archbishop 1883–1884)
  - George Thomas Montgomery, Coadjutor Archbishop (1902–1907), died before succeeding to see
3. Edward Joseph Hanna (1915–1935)
4. John Joseph Mitty (1935–1961; Coadjutor Archbishop 1932–1935)
5. Joseph Thomas McGucken (1962–1977)
6. John Raphael Quinn (1977–1995)
7. William Joseph Levada (1995–2005), appointed Prefect of the Congregation for the Doctrine of the Faith (elevated to Cardinal in 2006)
8. George Hugh Niederauer (2006–2012)
9. Salvatore Joseph Cordileone (2012–present)

=== Auxiliary bishops ===
- Denis Joseph O'Connell (1908–1912), appointed Bishop of Richmond
- Edward Joseph Hanna (1912–1914), appointed Archbishop of San Francisco in 1915
- Thomas Arthur Connolly (1939–1948), appointed Coadjutor Bishop and later Bishop and Archbishop of Seattle
- Hugh Aloysius Donohoe (1947–1962), appointed Bishop of Stockton
- James Thomas O'Dowd (1948–1950)
- Merlin Joseph Guilfoyle (1950–1969), appointed Bishop of Stockton
- William Joseph McDonald (1967–1979)
- Mark Joseph Hurley (1968–1969), appointed Bishop of Santa Rosa
- Norman Francis McFarland (1970–1974), appointed Bishop of Reno-Las Vegas
- Francis Anthony Quinn (1978–1979), appointed Bishop of Sacramento
- Roland Pierre DuMaine (1978–1981), appointed Bishop of San Jose in California
- Daniel Francis Walsh (1981–1987), appointed Bishop of Reno and later Bishop of Las Vegas and Bishop of Santa Rosa in California
- Carlos Arthur Sevilla, S.J. (1988–1996), appointed Bishop of Yakima
- Patrick Joseph McGrath (1988–1998), appointed Coadjutor Bishop and later Bishop of San Jose in California
- John Charles Wester (1998–2007), appointed Coadjutor Bishop and Bishop of Salt Lake City and later Archbishop of Santa Fe
- Ignatius Chung Wang (2002–2009)
- William Joseph Justice (2008–2017)
- Robert Walter McElroy (2010–2015), appointed Bishop of San Diego
- Robert Francis Christian, O.P. (2018–2019)

=== Other diocesan priests who became bishops ===
- Lawrence Scanlan, appointed Vicar Apostolic of Utah in 1887 and later Bishop of Salt Lake City
- Patrick Joseph James Keane, appointed Auxiliary Bishop of Sacramento in 1920 and later Bishop of Sacramento
- James Joseph Sweeney, appointed Bishop of Honolulu in 1941
- John Joseph Scanlan, appointed Auxiliary Bishop of Honolulu in 1954 and later Bishop of Honolulu
- William Joseph Moran, appointed auxiliary bishop of United States of America Military in 1965
- Francis Thomas Hurley, appointed Auxiliary Bishop in 1970 and Bishop of Juneau and later Archbishop of Anchorage
- John Stephen Cummins, appointed Auxiliary Bishop of Sacramento in 1974 and later Bishop of Oakland
- Richard John Garcia (priest here, 1973–1981), appointed Auxiliary Bishop of Sacramento in 1997 and later Bishop of Monterey California
- Randolph Roque Calvo, appointed Bishop of Reno in 2005
- Thomas Anthony Daly, appointed Auxiliary Bishop of San Jose in California in 2011 and later Bishop of Spokane
- Steven Joseph Lopes, appointed Bishop of the Personal Ordinariate of the Chair of Saint Peter in 2015
- John Charles Wester, appointed Bishop of Salt Lake City on January 8, 2007, and later Archbishop of Santa Fe on April 27, 2015.

== Cathedrals ==
- Old Cathedral of Saint Mary of the Immaculate Conception – in Chinatown (1854–1891).
- Cathedral of Saint Mary of the Assumption – (1891–1962), destroyed by fire in 1962
- Cathedral of Saint Mary of the Assumption – (1891–1962) in Cathedral Hill; modern structure (1971–present).

== Churches ==
The archdiocese has the following historic churches:

- Mission San Francisco de Asís – dedicated in 1776, it is the oldest building in San Francisco
- Saints Peter and Paul Church – dedicated in 1924, it is known as the Italian cathedral of the West as it originally served Italian immigrants

== Education ==
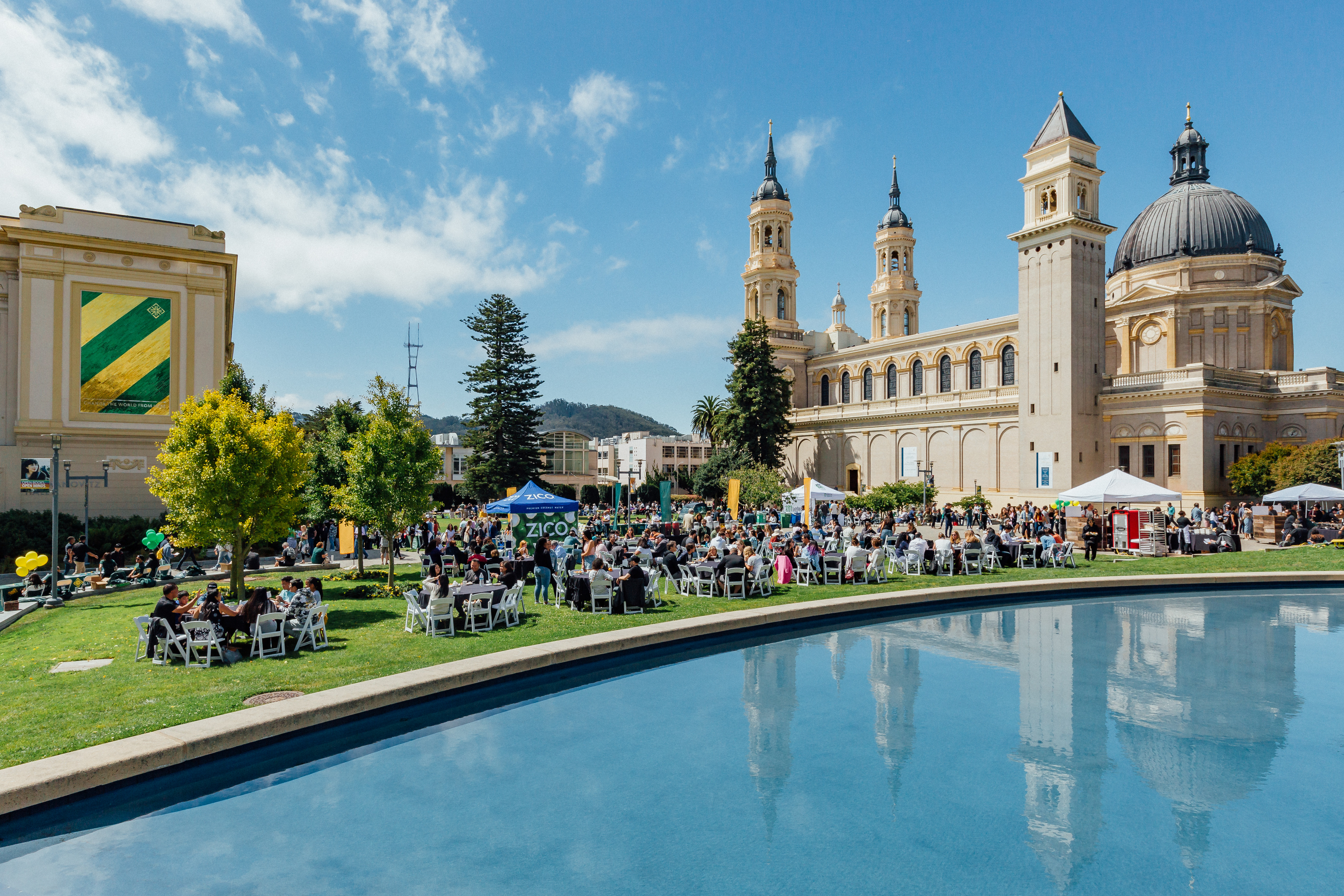
University of San Francisco (2018)

All full-time faculty, librarians, and counselors at Archbishop Riordan, Junipero Serra, Marin Catholic, and Sacred Heart Cathedral high schools are represented by The San Francisco Archdiocesan Federation of Teachers, Local 2240. As of July 2024, the superintendent of schools for the archdiocese is Christopher Fisher.

=== Marin County ===
Marin Catholic High School – Kentfield

=== San Francisco ===
- Archbishop Riordan High School
- Convent & Stuart Hall Schools of the Sacred Heart
- ICA Cristo Rey Academy
- Nativity High School
- Sacred Heart Cathedral Preparatory
- St. Ignatius College Preparatory

=== San Mateo County ===
- Chesterton Academy of St. James – Menlo Park
- Junípero Serra High School – San Mateo
- Mercy High School – Burlingame
- Notre Dame High School – Belmont
- Sacred Heart Preparatory – Atherton
- Woodside Priory School – Portola Valley

=== Closed schools ===
Mercy High School – San Francisco

=== Seminaries ===
- St. Joseph's Seminary – Mountain View (closed)
- Saint Patrick's Seminary and University – Menlo Park

== Media ==
The archdiocese's first official weekly newspaper was The Monitor. It began publishing in 1858 in part to defend San Francisco's minority groups against attacks by The Hounds. The paper was funded by subscriptions. By the 1980s, its readership among immigrants had waned, despite changes such as publishing bilingual English–Spanish issues. In 1981, circulation was further impacted by the establishment of the Diocese of San José and its paper The Valley Catholic. The Monitor published its last issue on June 14, 1984, citing competition from television.

In 1999, the archdiocese began publishing a second paper, Catholic San Francisco, adding a Spanish edition, San Francisco Católico, in 2012. Catholic San Francisco now publishes in magazine format.

KSFB, an independent Catholic radio station, broadcasts from San Francisco.

== Province of San Francisco ==
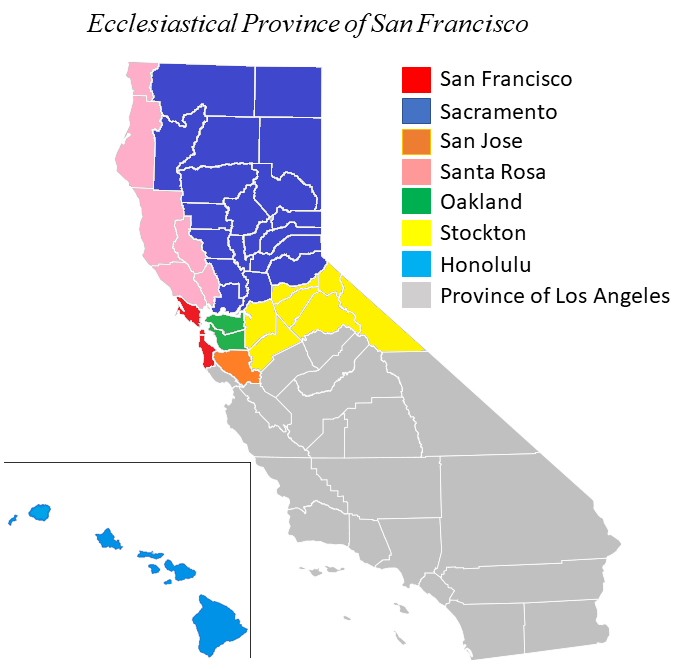
Map of the Ecclesiastical Province of San Francisco

The Metropolitan Ecclesiastical Province of San Francisco covers Northern California north of the Monterey Bay, as well as all of Hawaii. The Archbishop of San Francisco, who is ex officio metropolitan bishop of the province of San Francisco, has limited oversight responsibilities for the Dioceses of Honolulu, Oakland, Sacramento, San Jose, Santa Rosa, and Stockton.

Prior to the elevation of the Diocese of Las Vegas to an archdiocese in May 2023, the province of San Francisco also covered the Dioceses of Las Vegas, Reno and Salt Lake City. Prior to the elevation of the Diocese of Los Angeles to an archdiocese in 1936, the province of San Francisco included all of the Catholic dioceses in California, Nevada, Utah, and Hawaii.
