= Joseph Thomas McGucken =

American prelate (1902–1983)

His Excellency, The Most Reverend Joseph Thomas McGucken
- Archbishop of San Francisco
- Archbishop McGucken in 1964
- See: San Francisco
- Appointed: February 19, 1962
- Installed: April 3, 1962
- Term ended: February 16, 1977
- Predecessor: John Joseph Mitty
- Successor: John R. Quinn
- Previous posts: Bishop of Sacramento (1957–1962); Coadjutor Bishop of Sacramento (1955–1957); Auxiliary Bishop of Los Angeles (1941–1955)

Orders
- Ordination: January 15, 1928 by Giuseppe Palica
- Consecration: March 19, 1941 by John Joseph Cantwell

Personal details
- Born: March 13, 1902 Los Angeles, California, US
- Died: October 6, 1983 (aged 81) San Francisco, California, US
- Denomination: Roman Catholic Church
- Education: University of California, Los Angeles; St. Patrick's Seminary in Menlo Park; Pontifical North American College
- Motto: Emitte spiritum tuum (Send forth your Spirit)

Styles of Joseph Thomas McGucken
- Reference style: His Excellency; The Most Reverend
- Spoken style: Your Excellency
- Religious style: Archbishop

Joseph Thomas McGucken (March 13, 1902 – October 6, 1983) was an American prelate of the Roman Catholic Church. He served as an auxiliary bishop of the Archdiocese of Los Angeles in California (1941–1955), coadjutor bishop and bishop of the Diocese of Sacramento in California (1955–1962) and archbishop of the Archdiocese of San Francisco in California (1962–1977).

== Biography ==
=== Early life ===
Joseph McGucken was born on March 13, 1902, in Los Angeles, California, to Joseph A. and Mary Agnes (née Flynn) McGucken. He attended Polytechnic High School in Los Angeles. After his graduation, McGucken entered the University of California, Los Angeles (UCLA) to study engineering. Deciding to become a priest, he left UCLA after two years and entered at St. Patrick's Seminary in Menlo Park, California. He continued his studies at the Pontifical North American College in Rome, where he obtained a Doctor of Divinity degree in 1928.

=== Priesthood ===
While in Rome, McGucken was ordained a priest by Archbishop Giuseppe Palica for the Diocese of Los Angeles-San Diego on January 15, 1928.

Following his return to Los Angeles, he served as secretary to Bishop (later Archbishop) John Joseph Cantwell from 1929 to 1938. He was named a papal chamberlain by Pope Pius XI in 1937, and served as chancellor of the Archdiocese of Los Angeles from 1938 to 1948. He was raised by Pope Pius XII to the rank of domestic prelate in 1939.

=== Auxiliary Bishop of Los Angeles ===
On February 4, 1941, McGucken was appointed as an auxiliary bishop of Los Angeles and titular bishop of Sanavus by Pius XII. He received his episcopal consecration at Saint Vibiana Cathedral in Los Angeles on March 19, 1941, from Archbishop Cantwell, with Bishops Daniel Gercke and Philip George Scher serving as co-consecrators. In addition to his episcopal duties, McGucken served as pastor at St. Andrew's Parish in Pasadena, California, (1944–1955) and as vicar general of the archdiocese (1948–1955).

=== Coadjutor Bishop and Bishop of Sacramento ===
Pius XII named McGucken as coadjutor bishop of the Diocese of Sacramento on October 26, 1955. St. Andrew's Parish gave McGucken a farewell celebration at the Pasadena Civic Auditorium, with performances by singer Dennis Day, several choirs, and a US Army color guard.

When Bishop Robert Armstrong died on January 14, 1957, McGucken automatically succeeded him. In his five years as bishop, he authorized, built or approved for development nine parishes, three high schools, 33 new church buildings and one minor seminary.

=== Archbishop of San Francisco ===
On February 19, 1962, McGucken was appointed archbishop of San Francisco by Pope John XXIII; McGucken was installed on April 3, 1962.

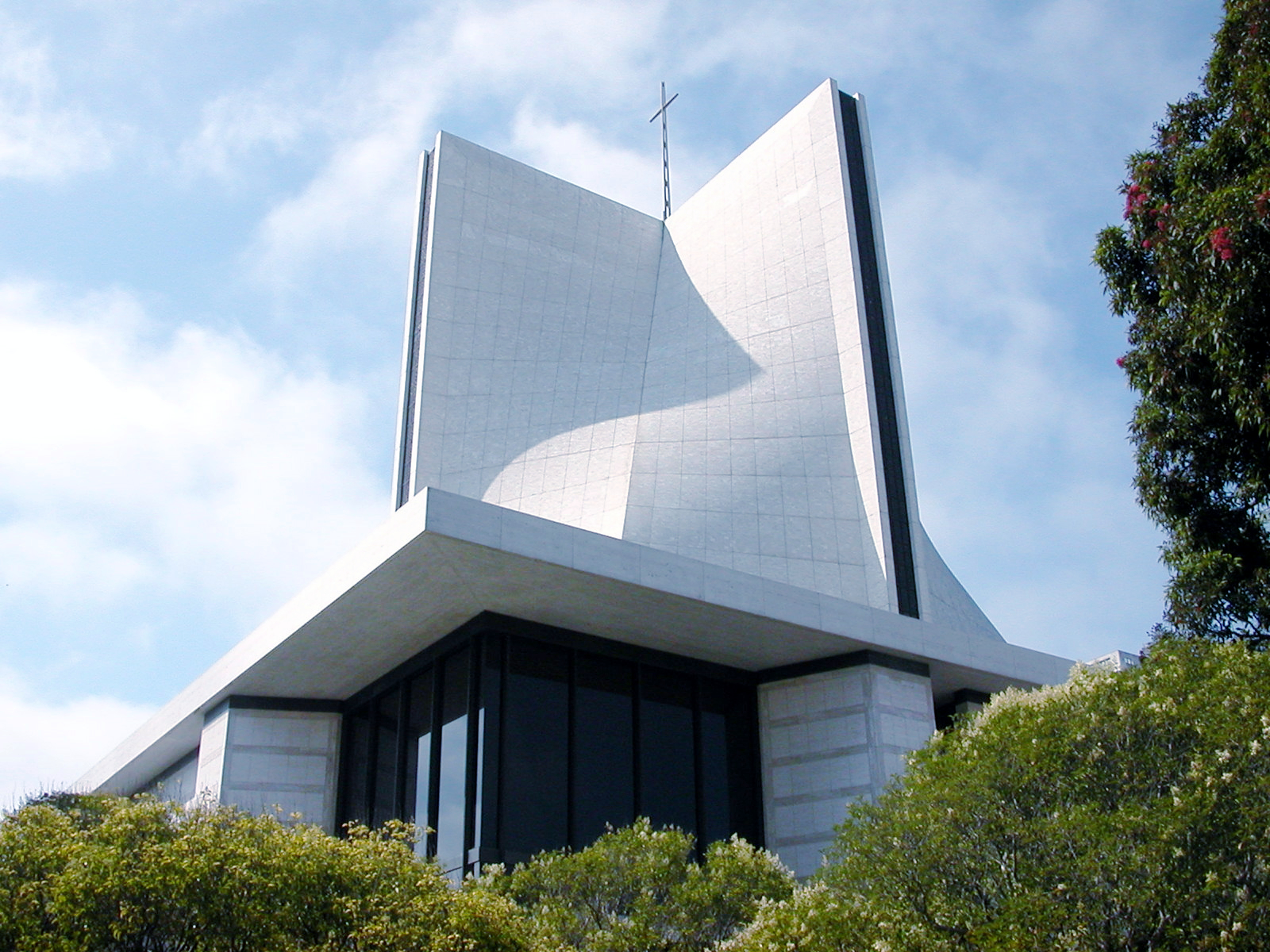
Cathedral of St. Mary of the Assumption, San Francisco, California (2006)

In 1962 the existing St. Mary's Cathedral in San Francisco, built in 1891, was destroyed by fire. McGucken gathered his consultants to begin the process of planning and constructing a new Cathedral of St. Mary. Architectural critic Allan Temko advocated a bold, new cathedral that would reflect San Francisco's status as a major international urban center. McGucken added two internationally known architects to his team, Italian-born Pietro Belluschi from the Massachusetts Institute of Technology, who was placed in charge of designs, and Pier Luigi Nervi, an engineer from Rome, who took over structural concerns. The strikingly modern design which was presented was met with high praise and has been called the "first cathedral truly of our time and in harmony with the liturgical reforms of the Council."

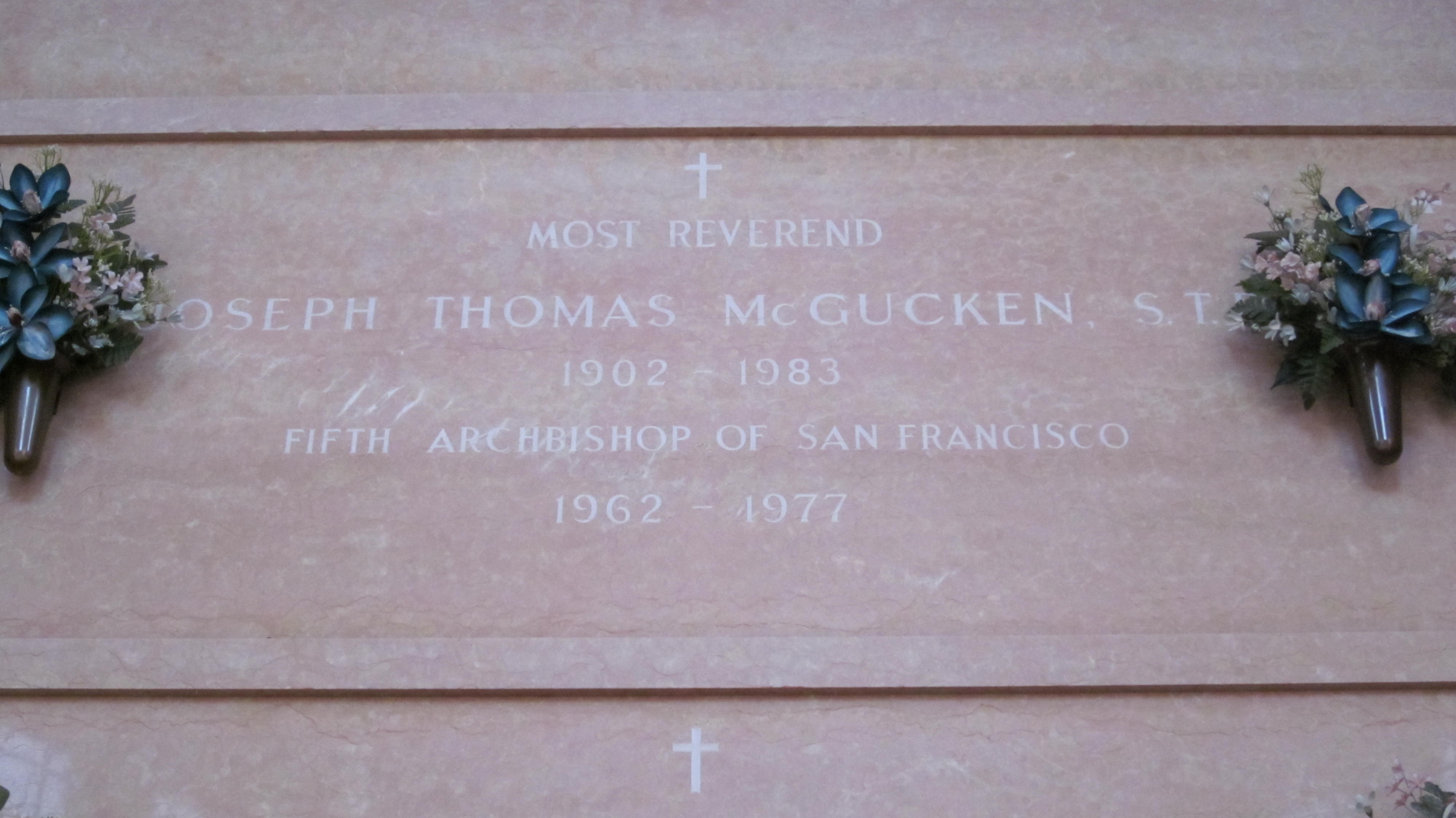
McGucken's vault at Holy Cross Cemetery, Colma, California (2010)

In 1966, McGucken publicly voiced his support for the efforts of Cesar Chávez to organize farmworkers in California's vineyards. McGucken's stand led one vineyard spokesman to warn that "the Church leaders had better start looking for other financial means to carry out their radical theories."

=== Retirement and legacy ===
On February 16, 1977, Pope Paul VI accepted McGucken's resignation as archbishop of San Francisco. Thomas McGucken died on October 6, 1983. He is buried in the Archbishops' Crypt at Holy Cross Cemetery in Colma, California.

In 1994, Terence McAteer made public an accusation that he was raped in 1967 when he was ten-years-old by Reverend Austin Peter Keegan, a priest in the archdiocese. McAteer had reported the rape in 1976 to Reverend Vincent Ring, who informed McGucken. Three years later, Keegan sexually assaulted another boy.

=== Clashes with Reverend Eugene Boyle ===
Reverend Eugene Boyle was a priest directly under McGucken's authority in San Francisco during McGucken's tenure as archbishop. While not antagonistic to Boyle (in fact the two always remained respectful of each other), Boyle and McGucken did clash over a number of issues. Boyle was an explicitly progressive priest during the 1960s and 1970s. Inspired by the Second Vatican Council of the early 1960s. Boyle campaigned on behalf of San Francisco's African American community as well as engaging with the American Civil Rights Movement. He also supported the United Farm Workers and the Black Panther Party.

McGurken did not oppose the right of priests such as Boyle to support social justice movements. However, when Boyle was involved in a number of controversies and conservative sections of the Californian public pushed back against him, McGucken tried to err on the side of caution and sided against Boyle. The back and forth between Boyle and McGucken would dominate much of McGucken's term as archbishop.

== See also ==
- Roman Catholic Archdiocese of San Francisco

== Episcopal succession ==
Catholic Church titles
Preceded by John Joseph Mitty	Archbishop of San Francisco; 1962–1977	Succeeded by John R. Quinn
Preceded by Robert John Armstrong	Bishop of Sacramento; 1955–1962	Succeeded by Alden John Bell
