= George Hugh Niederauer =

American bishop

His Excellency, The Most Reverend George Hugh Niederauer
- Archbishop of San Francisco
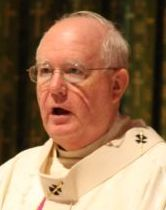
- Church: Roman Catholic
- Archdiocese: San Francisco
- Appointed: December 15, 2005
- Installed: February 15, 2006
- Term ended: July 27, 2012
- Predecessor: William Levada
- Successor: Salvatore J. Cordileone
- Previous post: Bishop of Salt Lake City (1995–2005)

Orders
- Ordination: April 30, 1962 by James Francis Aloysius McIntyre
- Consecration: January 25, 1995 by Roger Mahony, William Levada, and Tod Brown

Personal details
- Born: June 14, 1936 Los Angeles, California, US
- Died: May 2, 2017 (aged 80) San Rafael, California, US
- Denomination: Roman Catholic
- Education: Stanford University; St. John's Seminary; Catholic University of America in Washington, D.C. Loyola Marymount University; University of Southern California
- Motto: To serve and to give

Styles of George Hugh Niederauer
- Reference style: His Excellency; The Most Reverend
- Spoken style: Your Excellency
- Religious style: Archbishop

George Hugh Niederauer (June 14, 1936 – May 2, 2017) was an American prelate of the Roman Catholic Church. He served as the archbishop of San Francisco in California from 2005 to 2012. Before that, Niederauer served as bishop of Salt Lake City in Utah from 1994 to 2005.

== Biography ==
=== Early life ===
George Niederauer was born on June 14, 1936 in Los Angeles, California, the only child of George and Elaine Niederauer. He attended St. Catherine's Military School in Anaheim, California, and then St. Anthony High School in Long Beach, California; he was a classmate of future Cardinal William Levada.

After graduating from highs school in 1954, he attended Stanford University in Stanford, California. During his freshman year, Niederauer decided to enter the priesthood. He enrolled at St. John's Seminary in Camarillo, California, earning a Bachelor of Arts degree in philosophy in 1959. He further completed his studies with a Bachelor of Sacred Theology degree from the Catholic University of America in Washington, D.C., and a Master of Arts degree in English literature from Loyola Marymount University in Los Angeles in 1962. Niederauer also earned a Ph.D. in English Literature at the University of Southern California in Los Angeles.

=== Priesthood ===
Niederauer was ordained to the priesthood for the Archdiocese of Los Angeles at St. Vibiana Cathedral in Los Angeles on April 30, 1962 by Cardinal James Francis Aloysius McIntyre. The Vatican elevated Niederauer to the rank of honorary prelate of his holiness in 1984. Niederauer served as rector of St. John's Seminary in Camarillo from 1987 to 1992.

=== Bishop of Salt Lake City ===
Niederauer was appointed the eighth bishop of Salt Lake City by Pope John Paul II on November 3, 1994. Niederauer received his episcopal consecration at the Cathedral of the Madeleine in Salt Lake City, Utah, on January 25, 1995, from Cardinal Roger Mahony, with Archbishop William Levada and Bishop Tod David Brown serving as co-consecrators. In a 2013 article, Gary Topping described Niederauer as;

"the most approachable of persons and one whose homilies were almost magical in their ability to make potentially difficult Scripture passages and theological concepts comprehensible and applicable – even inspiring – in our daily lives."

=== Archbishop of San Francisco ===
On December 15, 2005, Pope Benedict XVI named Niederauer as archbishop of San Francisco. Niederauer was the chairman of the United States Conference of Catholic Bishops Committee on Communication, and a member of the Pontifical Council for Social Communications.On 2011, Niederauer underwent emergency double bypass cardiac surgery.

=== Retirement and death ===
On July 27, 2012, Niederauer resigned as archbishop of San Francisco. Niederauer died in San Raphael, California, on May 2, 2017, at age 80.

== Views ==
=== Same sex marriage ===
In 2008, Niederauer campaigned in favor of California's Proposition 8, a ballot measure to recognize heterosexual marriage as the only valid form of marriage. Niederauer claimed to have been instrumental in forging alliances between Catholics and Mormons to support the measure. Wrote the San Francisco Chronicle,

"Niederauer drew in the Church of Jesus Christ of Latter-day Saints and proved to be a critical move in building a multi-religious coalition—the backbone of the fundraising, organizing and voting support for the successful ballot measure. By bringing together Mormons and Catholics, Niederauer would align the two most powerful religious institutions in the Prop. 8 battle."

=== Films ===
In 2006, Niederauer said in an interview that he had seen the 2005 film Brokeback Mountain, and gave this analysis of it;

"I thought it was very powerful, and I probably had a different take on it than a lot of people did.... It was a story not only about the relationship between the two principal characters, but very much a cluster of relationships... And I think in all of that one of the lessons is the destructiveness of not being honest with yourself, and not being honest with other people – and not being faithful, trying to live a double life, and what that does to each of the lives you try to live."

=== Abstinence ===
In 2006, Niederauer spoke about sexual abstinence in an interview,

"Our belief is that we have to hold up the standard of abstinence, and we do that in all of our teaching about sexuality by saying that sexual activity outside of marriage is wrong. Now that's a very high bar to set and I understand that. And I don't regret that – I subscribe to it and I teach it. I understand why people find it difficult and disagree with it. I understand why they do. I don't agree with them.... What I would say is that people who disagree with us can disagree without being disagreeable."

=== Moral teaching ===
"Authentic moral teaching is based on objective truth, not polling."

== See also ==
- Catholic Church hierarchy
- Catholic Church in the United States
- Historical list of the Catholic bishops of the United States
- List of Catholic bishops of the United States
- Lists of patriarchs, archbishops, and bishops

== Sources ==
- "George Hugh Niederauer". Catholic-Hierarchy.org. David M. Cheney.
- Salt Lake Diocese press release of Niederauer's appointment as archbishop

== Episcopal succession ==
Catholic Church titles
Preceded by William Levada	Archbishop of San Francisco; 2006–2012	Succeeded by Salvatore J. Cordileone
Preceded by William Kenneth Weigand	Bishop of Salt Lake City; 1995–2005	Succeeded by John Charles Wester
