= John R. Quinn (bishop) =

American Catholic prelate (1929–2017)

His Excellency, The Most Reverend John Raphael Quinn
- Archbishop of San Francisco
- Church: Catholic
- Archdiocese: San Francisco
- Appointed: February 16, 1977
- Installed: April 26, 1977
- Term ended: December 27, 1995
- Predecessor: Joseph T. McGucken
- Successor: William Levada
- Previous posts: Archbishop of Oklahoma City (1971–1977); Auxiliary Bishop of San Diego & Titular Bishop of Thisiduo (1967–1971)

Orders
- Ordination: July 19, 1953 by Ettore Cunial
- Consecration: December 12, 1967 by Luigi Raimondi, Francis James Furey, and Frederick William Freking

Personal details
- Born: March 28, 1929 Riverside, California, US
- Died: June 22, 2017 (aged 88) San Francisco, California, US
- Motto: Lumen gentium Christus (Christ is the light of all nations)

Styles of John Raphael Quinn
- Reference style: His Excellency; The Most Reverend
- Spoken style: Your Excellency
- Religious style: Archbishop

John Raphael Quinn (March 28, 1929 – June 22, 2017) was an American prelate of the Catholic Church who served as archbishop of San Francisco in California from 1977 to 1995.

Quinn previously served as an auxiliary bishop of San Diego in California from 1967 to 1971 and as archbishop of Oklahoma City in Oklahoma from 1971 to 1977. He also served as the president of the United States Conference of Catholic Bishops from 1977 to 1980.

== Early life and ordination ==
John Quinn was born on March 28, 1929, in Riverside, California. Quinn was ordained to the priesthood in Rome for the Diocese of San Diego on July 19, 1953, by Archbishop Ettore Cunial.

== Auxiliary Bishop of San Diego ==
Pope Paul VI named Quinn as an auxiliary bishop of San Diego and titular bishop of Thisiduo on October 21, 1967. He was consecrated on December 12, 1967, by Cardinal Luigi Raimondi.While a social progressive, Quinn was identified with a conservative camp in the questions of dogma.

== Archbishop of Oklahoma City ==
On November 17, 1971, Quinn was appointed bishop of Oklahoma City-Tulsa by Paul VI. When the Vatican split the diocese to form the Archdiocese of Oklahoma City and the Diocese of Tulsa on December 13, 1972, Quinn became the first archbishop of Oklahoma City.

The website of that Archdiocese reports that "he revealed his priorities by his actions: emphasis on priestly vocations, desire for better pastoral care of Spanish-speaking Catholics, re-establishment of a Catholic newspaper, appointment of a full-time youth director, and a reorganization of Catholic charities." As leader of the new archdiocese, Quinn "fought against the death penalty, championed land reform and complained about extremism in the right-to-life movement." Paul VI named Quinn to participate in the 1974 World Synod of Bishops.

== Archbishop of San Francisco ==
Quinn was appointed by Paul VI in 1977 as archbishop of San Francisco. In his early years in the Bay Area, he was simultaneously president of the USCC and NCCB, which often kept him away from the archdiocese. He was the first bishop of a diocese west of the Mississippi to become president of the USCC. He succeeded Bishop Joseph Bernardin. Kenneth Briggs, writing for The New York Times, deemed Quinn to be "much more at ease with the press than his predecessor". The same article described Quinn as "a polished, courtly gentleman, self-assured with a substantial element of modesty and self-effacement."

Quinn recognized that the archdiocese was too large for effective pastoral governance. He helped to implement the final plans for the Diocese of San José, which was erected by Pope John Paul II on January 27, 1981. In 1987, Quinn took a medical leave to deal with depression.

After the 1989 Loma Prieta earthquake, Quinn closed a dozen parishes whose churches had been severely damaged. This plan drew the wrath of many priests, 41 of whom signed a dissenting petition. Quinn sold the former archiepiscopal residence and in 1992 moved into the cathedral rectory, where he lived with fellow clergy until his retirement.

=== Retirement and legacy ===
Quinn retired as archbishop of San Francisco on December 27, 1995, at age 66.

There followed "a series of scandals during the past two years [1993-1995] involving child abuse and embezzlement by several San Francisco priests." The archbishop received particularly harsh criticism for his lenient treatment of Monsignor Patrick J. O'Shea, who was later removed from ministry and laicized due to sexual abuse crimes. O'Shea was a prominent figure in the Archdiocese of San Francisco, often promoted by Quinn. From 1972 to 1982, for instance, O'Shea was assistant director for Vocations, tasked with recruiting young priests, and also director of the archdiocesan Society for the Propagation of the Faith (1971–1982).

== Viewpoints ==
=== HIV/AIDS ===
In 1985, Quinn initiated the Catholic Church's first institutional response to the AIDS epidemic. When John Paul II visited San Francisco in 1987, Quinn arranged for him to meet with several AIDS patients, including a young boy.

=== LGBTQ ===
Quinn reached out to LGBTQ Catholics as early as 1983. He issued a document asking priests to take concerns of gay people seriously. In it, he said he wanted gay Catholics to find "a church where he or she will find acceptance, understanding, and love." He reminded priests that many gay Catholics saw their orientation as a positive.

During the 1980s, Quinn supported the efforts of Most Holy Redeemer Church in the Castro district of San Francisco in their efforts to reach out to the LGBTQ population of the neighborhood. Quinn regularly visited this parish, especially during the annual 40 Hours Vigil held in support of people who were HIV-positive and their caregivers.

=== Morality ===
In a 1971 interview, Quinn criticized American "pansexuality and materialism". He claimed that as a result, many parts of Western society did no believe in the supernatural explanation of priestly celibacy.

=== Óscar Romero ===
After the assassination of Archbishop Óscar Romero in El Salvador in March 1980, Quinn issued a statement lauding the murdered prelate as "a voice for the poor and the oppressed." Quinn attended Romero's funeral.

=== Roman Curia ===
Throughout his episcopate, Quinn maintained strong links with the Catholic Church in the United Kingdom, visiting there regularly. After his retirement as archbishop, he spent time at Campion Hall at the University of Oxford, lecturing in 1996 on "The Claims of the Primacy and the Costly Call to Unity". This lecture served as the first draft of his 1999 book, The Reform of the Papacy. His call for the reform of the Roman Curia and the reduction of its powers was interpreted by some as an attack on the papacy. Quinn repeatedly made it clear that he was not opposing the pope. In many ways, his writings prefigured the views of Pope Francis.

== Publications ==
Quinn was a regular contributor to the Jesuit magazine America.

- The Reform of the Papacy (New York: Crossroad Publishing, 1999).
- Revered and Reviled: A Re-Examination of Vatican Council I (New York: Crossroad Publishing, 2017).
- Ever Ancient, Ever New: Structures of Communion in the Church (New York: Paulist Press, 2013).

== See also ==
Catholic Church titles
Preceded by Joseph Bernardin	President of the United States Catholic Conference and National Conference of Catholic Bishops; 1977–1980	Succeeded by John Roach
Preceded by Joseph Thomas McGucken	Archbishop of San Francisco; 1977–1995	Succeeded by William Levada
Preceded by First Archbishop (erected)	Archbishop of Oklahoma City; 1972–1977	Succeeded by Charles Salatka
Preceded by Victor Joseph Reed	Bishop of Oklahoma City-Tulsa; 1971–1972	Succeeded by None (diocese split)
Preceded by -	Auxiliary Bishop of San Diego; 1967–1971	Succeeded by -
