= Saint Patrick's Seminary and University =

Roman Catholic seminary in Menlo Park, California

St. Patrick's Seminary and University
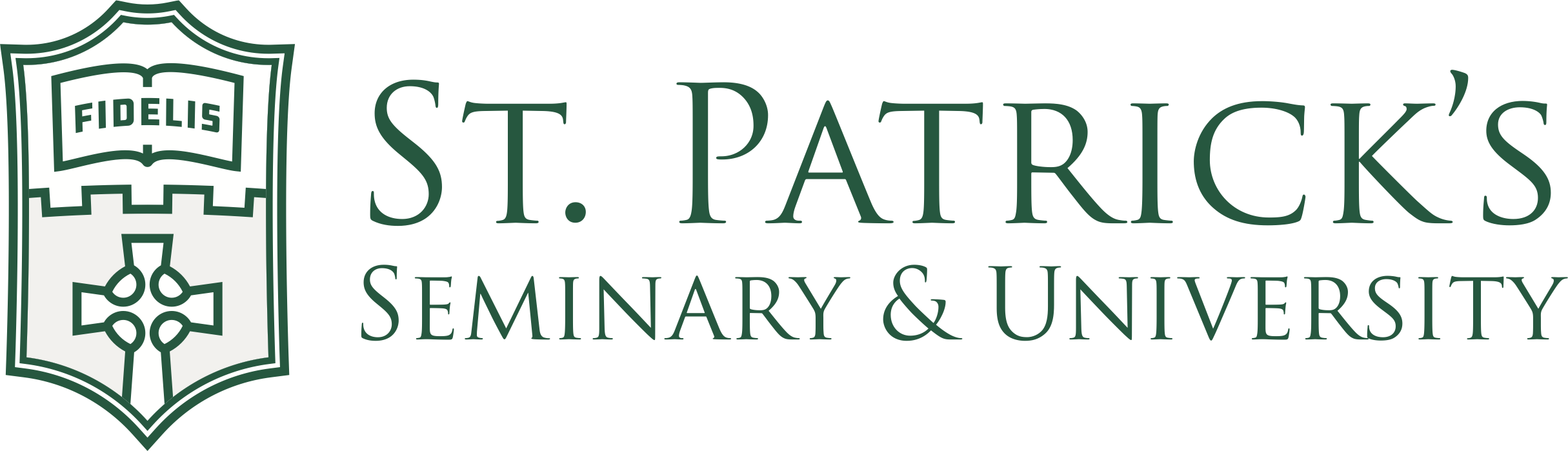
- Type: Seminary
- Established: September 20, 1898
- Affiliations: Catholic Church (Archdiocese of San Francisco)
- Chancellor: Salvatore Cordileone
- President: Very Rev. Mark D. Doherty
- Rector: Very Rev. Mark D. Doherty
- Students: 77
- Location: Menlo Park, California, United States; 37.45919°N 122.16808°W
- Website: www.stpsu.edu

St. Patrick's Seminary and University (STPSU) in Menlo Park, California, is a Roman Catholic undergraduate and graduate seminary whose primary mission is the formation of priests for dioceses in California and the Pacific Northwest of the United States.

STPSU was founded in 1898 by San Francisco Archbishop Patrick William Riordan with a faculty from the Sulpician order. In over 100 years, it has formed more than 2,000 priests. STPSU is governed by the Archdiocese of San Francisco in association with its other sponsoring dioceses.

== Description ==
As of 2024, the president-rector of STPSU is Reverend Mark D. Doherty. The board of trustees includes the Archbishop of San Francisco, Salvatore Cordileone, six bishops from dioceses in California, Washington State, and Hawaii, and other clergy. In 2022, STPSU had an enrollment of 62 men, representing 11 dioceses and religious orders.

STPSU is accredited as a graduate educational institution by the Western Association of Schools and Colleges and the Congregation for Catholic Education in Rome.

STPSU is affiliated with the Bishop White Seminary at Gonzaga University in Spokane, Washington. Seminarians who are enrolled in the undergraduate formation program at Bishop White can take pre-theology courses at STPSU.

== History ==
Archbishop Patrick William Riordan of San Francisco incorporated St. Patrick's Seminary with the State of California in 1891 with the goal of providing a seminary for students from the Pacific Coast states. The archdiocese received a donation of 86 acres in rural Menlo Park for the project. The seminary was staffed by the Society of Saint Sulpice in France, which provided three French and two American priests. Riordan named the new seminary after Saint Patrick of Armagh to honor the Irish donors to the project. The first rector of the seminary was Reverend Jean-Baptiste Vuibert.

On August 24, 1898, St. Patrick's Seminary was dedicated by Riordan, joined by Bishops George Montgomery of Los Angeles and Thomas Grace of Sacramento, along with more than 100 clergy. On September 20, 1898, the seminary received 31 high school students and three college-level students. At that time, the seminary program was 12 years of study, including high school, undergraduate college and graduate studies. Riordan presided over the first commencement exercises at St. Patrick's on May 31, 1899.

As St. Patrick's continued to grow, the archdiocese established a department of philosophy with six students. In 1903, the Little Sisters of the Holy Family, a religious order based in Sherbrooke, Quebec, sent a contingent of nuns to Menlo Park to take care of the domestic services, such as cooking, laundry and cleaning, at St. Patrick's.

St. Patrick's was severely damaged in the 1906 San Francisco Earthquake. However, it remained open and the damage was repaired by 1909. Due to increased enrollment, the archdiocese opened St. Joseph's College in 1924 in Mountain View, California. Seminarians spent their first six years at St. Joseph's, then studied philosophy and theology at St. Patrick's.

By the 1950s, STPSU was a highly regimented organization. Seminarians had only two-and-a-half hours of free time, newspapers were forbidden, and TV and radio were very limited. Seminarians could only leave the campus on Thursday afternoons with permission. The curriculum was also strictly regulated. Seminarians were supposed to remain silent except during their free time. By the early 1960s, a large number of seminarians and a few faculty started pushing for changes in the rules and an update of the curriculum. With the arrival of Reverend Paul Purta as rector in 1964, the seminary started liberalizing.

St. Joseph's College closed in 1991; its buildings had been irreparably damaged in the 1989 Loma Prieta earthquake. STPSU became the only seminary program for the Archdiocese of San Francisco. In 1994, the Little Sisters of the Holy Family left STPSU due to a lack of personnel; they were replaced with nuns from the Oblates of Jesus the Priest from Mexico. In February 2017, Bishop Patrick Joseph McGrath announced that the Diocese of San Jose would send its seminarians to the University of Saint Mary of the Lake/Mundelein Seminary in Mundelein, Illinois, instead of to STPSU. At that time, the diocese had 11 seminarians at STPSU.

The Sulpicians withdrew its affiliation from STPSU on June 30, 2017. The STPSU board of trustees had recently told them that it wanted to establish a more collaborative administration of the institution. In announcing their departure, the Sulpicians said that the archdiocese was removing them entirely from the STPSU administration.

In April 2022, STPSU introduced a preparatory first year of seminary training that it called the Propaedeutic Stage. The seminary was following new guidelines from the US Conference of Catholic Bishops. All six men who graduated from STPSU in 2023 with both Master of Divinity and Bachelor of Sacred Theology degrees were ordained in their dioceses.

== Programs ==
=== Propaedeutic Stage Program ===
The Propaedeutic Stage Program is a first year program of intellectual formation for seminarians. It combines 12 academic courses with intensive personal development of the participants. STPSU states that the program's aim is to develop an "...intellectual formation of a mystagogical nature..." in the seminarian.

=== Pre-Theology Program ===
The Pre-Theology Program is a two-semester program of classes in philosophy, Latin language, and sacred scriptures. It is designed for incoming seminarians with bachelor's degrees but no background in philosophy or any other seminary formation experience.

=== Bachelor of Sacred Theology (S.T.B.) ===
The Bachelor of Sacred Theology program is designed for seminarians with bachelor's degrees who have at least 30 credit hours of philosophy coursework and a reading knowledge of Latin. It supplants the Pre-Theology Program for these candidates. The program includes instruction in Biblical Greek. Seminarians can pursue an S.T.B degree at the same time as a M.Div. degree.

=== Master of Divinity (M.Div.) ===
The Master of Divinity Program is an advanced academic program for seminarians with bachelor's degrees to serve as the final preparation for priests entering parish work. It provides 30 credits of philosophy and 12 credits of religious studies over four-and-a-half years of study. The third year includes a five- to seven-month internship in the seminarian's home diocese.

=== Master of Arts (Theology) ===
The Master of Arts (Theology) program is an advanced alternative to the M.Div. degree for seminarians who are planning to teach, write or work in church administration. It requires a bachelor's degree with 12 credit hours of philosophy or religious studies, along with letters of recommendation. The program includes coursework and a master's thesis.

=== BA Completion Degree Program ===
The BA Completing Degree Program is for incoming seminarians or lay people who do not have a bachelor's degree. It allows them to complete a bachelor's degree in philosophy.

== Notable alumni or staff ==
Notable alumni and staff include:

- Archbishop Robert Emmet Lucey
- Bishop William Joseph Condon
- Bishop William Joseph Moran
- Bishop Edward Kelly
- Bishop Duane Garrison Hunt
- Bishop Francis Peter Leipzig
- Archbishop Thomas Arthur Connolly
- Bishop James Joseph Sweeney
- Archbishop James Peter Davis
- Bishop Hugh Aloysius Donohoe
- Bishop Alden John Bell
- Bishop Francis Joseph Green
- Bishop James Thomas O'Dowd
- Archbishop Robert Joseph Dwyer
- Bishop Thomas Edward Gill
- Bishop Merlin Guilfoyle
- Cardinal Timothy Manning
- Archbishop Cornelius Michael Power
- Bishop Harry Anselm Clinch
- Bishop Mark Joseph Hurley
- Bishop Leo Thomas Maher
- Bishop Norman Francis McFarland
- Bishop Francis Quinn
- Bishop Thomas Joseph Connolly
- Archbishop Francis Thomas Hurley
- Bishop John Stephen Cummins
- Bishop Pierre DuMaine
- Bishop Tomas Aguon Camacho
- Bishop Michael Hughes Kenny
- Bishop Daniel F. Walsh
- Bishop Richard John Garcia
- Archbishop John Charles Wester
- Bishop Clarence (Larry) Silva
- Bishop Thomas Anthony Daly
- Cardinal Robert W. McElroy
- Bishop John P. Dolan
- Archbishop Ryan Pagente Jimenez
- Bishop William J. Justice
- Bishop Randolph Roque Calvo
- Bishop Steven J. Lopes
- Bishop William J. McDonald
