= Duane Garrison Hunt =

American prelate

His Excellency, The Most Reverend Duane Garrison Hunt
- Bishop of Salt Lake/Salt Lake City
- Church: Roman Catholic
- See: Diocese of Salt Lake/Salt Lake City
- Appointed: August 6, 1937
- In office: October 28, 1937– March 31, 1960
- Predecessor: James Edward Kearney
- Successor: Joseph Lennox Federal

Orders
- Ordination: June 27, 1920 by Joseph Sarsfield Glass
- Consecration: October 28, 1937 by John Joseph Mitty

Personal details
- Born: September 19, 1884 Reynolds, Nebraska, US
- Died: March 31, 1960 (aged 75) Salt Lake City, Utah, U.S.
- Denomination: Roman Catholic
- Education: Cornell College (BA); University of Chicago; Saint Patrick's Seminary and University
- Motto: Per ecclesiam ad Deum (Through the church to God)

Styles of Duane Hunt
- Reference style: The Most Reverend
- Spoken style: Your Excellency
- Religious style: Monsignor
- Posthumous style: none

Duane Garrison Hunt (September 19, 1884—March 31, 1960) was an American prelate of the Roman Catholic Church. He served as bishop of the Diocese of Salt Lake in Utah from 1937 until his death in 1960.

== Biography ==
=== Early life and education ===
Raised in a Methodist family, Duane Hunt was born on September 19, 1884, in Reynolds, Nebraska, to Andrew Dixon and Lodema Esther (née Garrison) Hunt. He attended Cornell College in Mount Vernon, Iowa, where he earned a Bachelor of Arts degree in 1907. He then taught at public high schools in Iowa until 1911, when he enrolled at the University of Iowa Law School. However, his poor eyesight forced him to withdraw from law school in 1912.

Hunt then entered the graduate school at the University of Chicago, in the field of public speaking. During his studies, he began to examine and question Methodism, his birth religion. He decided to convert to Catholicism, and was baptized at St. Thomas Church and Convent in Chicago in 1913. Shortly after his graduation from the University of Chicago, he moved to Salt Lake City, where he served as a faculty member of the speech department at the University of Utah from 1913 to 1916. Hunt resigned from his teaching post in order to study for the priesthood. He studied at St. Patrick's Seminary in Menlo Park, California, from 1916 to 1920.

=== Priesthood ===
On June 27, 1920, Hunt was ordained a priest for the Diocese of Salt Lake by Bishop Joseph Glass in the Cathedral of the Madeleine in Salt Lake City, Utah. After his ordination, the diocese assigned Glass as a missionary in Vernal, Utah for eight months. He was then named as curate at the cathedral parish, where he also served as director of the choir from 1923 to 1937. The Vatican elevated Hunt to the rank of papal chamberlain in 1924 and domestic prelate in 1930. He was appointed rector of the cathedral in 1925 and chancellor of the diocese in 1926. Hunt also served as vicar general of the diocese.

From 1927 to 1949, Hunt was the weekly speaker on NBC's "Catholic Hour," a radio program in which he discussed Catholic doctrine. He served as editor of the diocesan newspaper, The Intermountain Catholic, from 1926 to 1934. Despite his poor eyesight, Hunt ranked among the best tennis players in Utah and coached the first diocesan baseball league in 1928.

=== Bishop of Salt Lake and Salt Lake City ===
On August 6, 1937, Hunt was appointed the fifth bishop of Salt Lake by Pope Pius XI. He received his episcopal consecration at the Cathedral of the Madeleine on October 28, 1937, from Archbishop John Mitty, with Bishops Robert Armstrong and Thomas Gorman serving as co-consecrators. Hunt was the first Methodist convert to become a Catholic bishop.

During his tenure, Hunt established fifteen parishes throughout the state. He also invited such religious institutes as the Carmelites, Sisters of Charity of the Incarnate Word, and Trappists to serve in Utah. An apologist, he authored several defenses of the Catholic Church. These included The Continuity of the Catholic Church, which refuted Church of Jesus Christ of Latter Day Saints (LDS) claims against Catholicism. Hunt also met several times with LDS Church president David O. McKay. They met in secret to avoid fears of scandalizing their respective churches and spoke about community issues and tensions between their two groups.

In 1951, Pope Pius XII renamed the Diocese of Salt Lake as the Diocese of Salt Lake City.

=== Death and legacy ===
Hunt died from a heart ailment on March 31, 1960, at age 75 at Holy Cross Hospital in Salt Lake City. McKay attended his funeral.

Catholic Church titles
Preceded by James Edward Kearney	Bishop of Salt Lake City; 1937–1960	Succeeded by Joseph Lennox Federal
