= Joseph Lennox Federal =

American prelate

His Excellency, The Most Reverend Joseph Lennox Federal
- Bishop of Salt Lake; Titular Bishop of Appiaria
- Church: Roman Catholic Church
- See: Diocese of Salt Lake
- In office: March 31, 1960 to April 22, 1980
- Predecessor: Duane Garrison Hunt
- Successor: William Weigand
- Other posts: Auxiliary Bishop of Salt Lake; 1951 to 1958; Coadjutor Bishop of Salt Lake; 1958 to 1960 titular bishop of Appiaria

Orders
- Ordination: December 8, 1934 by Giuseppe Palica
- Consecration: April 11, 1951 by Amleto Cicognani

Personal details
- Born: January 13, 1910 Greensboro, North Carolina, US
- Died: August 31, 2000 (aged 90) Salt Lake City, Utah, US
- Education: Belmont Abbey College; Niagara University; University of Fribourg; Pontifical North American College
- Motto: Jesus nobis ostende (Show us Jesus)

Styles of Joseph Lennox Federal
- Reference style: The Most Reverend
- Spoken style: Your Excellency
- Religious style: Bishop
- Posthumous style: none

Joseph Lennox Federal (January 13, 1910 – August 31, 2000) was an American prelate of the Roman Catholic Church. He served as bishop of the Diocese of Salt Lake City in Utah from 1960 to 1980. He previously served as an auxiliary bishop and coadjutor bishop of the same diocese from 1951 to 1960.

== Early life ==
Joseph Federal was born on January 13, 1910, in Greensboro, North Carolina, to Charles and Margaret (née Keegan) Federal. He was the third of eight children. Federal studied at Belmont Abbey College in Belmont, North Carolina, Niagara University in Lewiston, New York, the University of Fribourg in Switzerland, and the Pontifical North American College in Rome.

== Priesthood ==
Federal was ordained a priest in Rome for the Diocese of Raleigh by Archbishop Giuseppe Palica on December 8, 1934. He was awarded a licentiate in theology from the Pontifical Gregorian University in 1935. Federal was assigned as a curate at St. Peter's Parish in Greenville, North Carolina. In 1937, he was named the first pastor of St. Margaret's Parish in Swannanoa, North Carolina. Federal was appointed rector of Sacred Heart Cathedral (1938–1951), and became a papal chamberlain in 1942.

== Auxiliary Bishop, Coadjutor Bishop and Bishop of Salt Lake ==
On February 5, 1951, Federal was appointed auxiliary bishop of the Diocese of Salt Lake City and titular bishop of Appiaria by Pope Pius XII. He received his episcopal consecration in Raleigh, North Carolina, on April 11, 1951, from Cardinal Amleto Cicognani, with Bishops Eugene J. McGuinness and Vincent Waters serving as co-consecrators.

Federal was named coadjutor bishop of Salt Lake City on May 1, 1958, by Pope John XXIII. He automatically succeeded Duane Hunt as the sixth bishop upon the latter's death on March 31, 1960.

Federal attended the Second Vatican Council in Rome from 1962 to 1965. During Federal's tenure, crews replaced the slate roof of the Cathedral of the Madeleine with copper along with some sandstone blocks and gargoyles. In 1970, he ordered the tolling of the cathedral bells as the hearse carrying the body of LDS President David O. McKay passed by.

== Retirement and legacy ==
On April 22, 1980, Pope John Paul II accepted Federal's resignation as bishop of the Diocese of Salt Lake. Joseph Federal died in Salt Lake City on August 31, 2000, at age 90.

Catholic Church titles
| Preceded by Duane Garrison Hunt | Bishop of Salt Lake City; 1960–1980 | Succeeded by William Weigand |
