= Lawrence Scanlan =

Irish Catholic missionary

His Excellency, The Right Reverend Lawrence Scanlan
- Bishop of Salt Lake
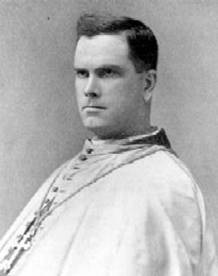
- Church: Catholic Church
- Diocese: Diocese of Salt Lake
- Appointed: January 30, 1891
- Term ended: May 10, 1915 (his death)
- Predecessor: Office established
- Successor: Joseph Sarsfield Glass
- Other post: Vicar Apostolic of Utah (1887-1891)

Orders
- Ordination: June 28, 1868 by John Francis Whelan
- Consecration: June 29, 1887 by Patrick William Riordan

Personal details
- Born: September 28, 1843 Ballytarsna, County Tipperary, Ireland
- Died: May 10, 1915 (aged 71) Salt Lake City, Utah, U.S.

Lawrence (Note: According to Scanlan himself, "I used to spell it 'Laurence,' and so many people spelled it the other way that I finally changed it to 'Lawrence.'") Scanlan (September 28, 1843 – May 10, 1915) was an Irish-born American prelate of the Catholic Church. A missionary and pioneer bishop, he served as the first bishop of Salt Lake in Utah from 1891 until his death in 1915.

== Early life ==
Scanlan was born on September 28, 1843, in Ballytarsna, County Tipperary, near Cashel in Ireland to Patrick and Catherine (née Ryan) Scanlan. He received his early education at a private school in Cashel and at St. Patrick's College in Thurles in Tipperary.

In 1863, Scanlan entered All Hallows College in Dublin, which had been founded 20 years earlier to train missionaries for English-speaking countries. He studied for the Archdiocese of San Francisco.

== Priesthood ==
Scanlan was ordained to the priesthood in Dublin on June 28, 1868, by Bishop John Francis Whelan. Following his ordination, Scanlan returned home and celebrated his first mass at the parish church in Moyne. He departed Ireland in July 1868, arriving at San Francisco in November 1868.

The archdiocese first assigned Scanlan as an assistant pastor at St. Patrick's Parish in San Francisco. He was transferred in 1870 for a few months to St. Mary's Cathedral Parish. then sent to work in the Diocese of Grass Valley. The new diocese assigned Scanlan as pastor of Holy Rosary Parish in Woodland, California.

The opening of silver mines in Pioche, Nevada, brought a huge influx of immigrant Catholic workers into the area. They petitioned Bishop Eugene O'Connell to assign a fulltime priest to Pioche. In response, O'Connell sent Scanlan to open a mission there in 1871. During his two years in Pioche, Scanlan built St. Laurence Church as well as a hospital for the miners. In early 1873, Scanlan return to the Archdiocese of San Francisco and was briefly assigned as pastor of St. Vincent's Parish in Petaluma, California.

During the summer of 1873, Archbishop Joseph Sadoc Alemany sent Scanlan to perform missionary work in the Utah Territory, which had been entrusted to the Archdiocese of San Francisco two years earlier. He arrived at Salt Lake City, Utah in August 1873. He found himself in charge of the largest parish in the United States, covering nearly 85,000 square miles and including one church to serve 800 Catholics.

Under Scanlan, the Catholic Church in Utah began to take root. He worked as a circuit rider, visiting the Catholics scattered throughout the territory and establishing mission churches. In 1875, he invited the Sisters of the Holy Cross to Utah, where they founded St. Mary's Academy and Holy Cross Hospital in Salt Lake City. In 1878, Alemany appointed Scanlan as vicar forane in Utah, making him the superior of the six Catholic priests in the territory.

In September 1886, Scanlan opened All Hallows College in Salt Lake City. He served on the faculty and resided from 1887 to 1889. He turned the college's management over to the Marist Fathers in 1889..

=== Relationship with Mormons ===
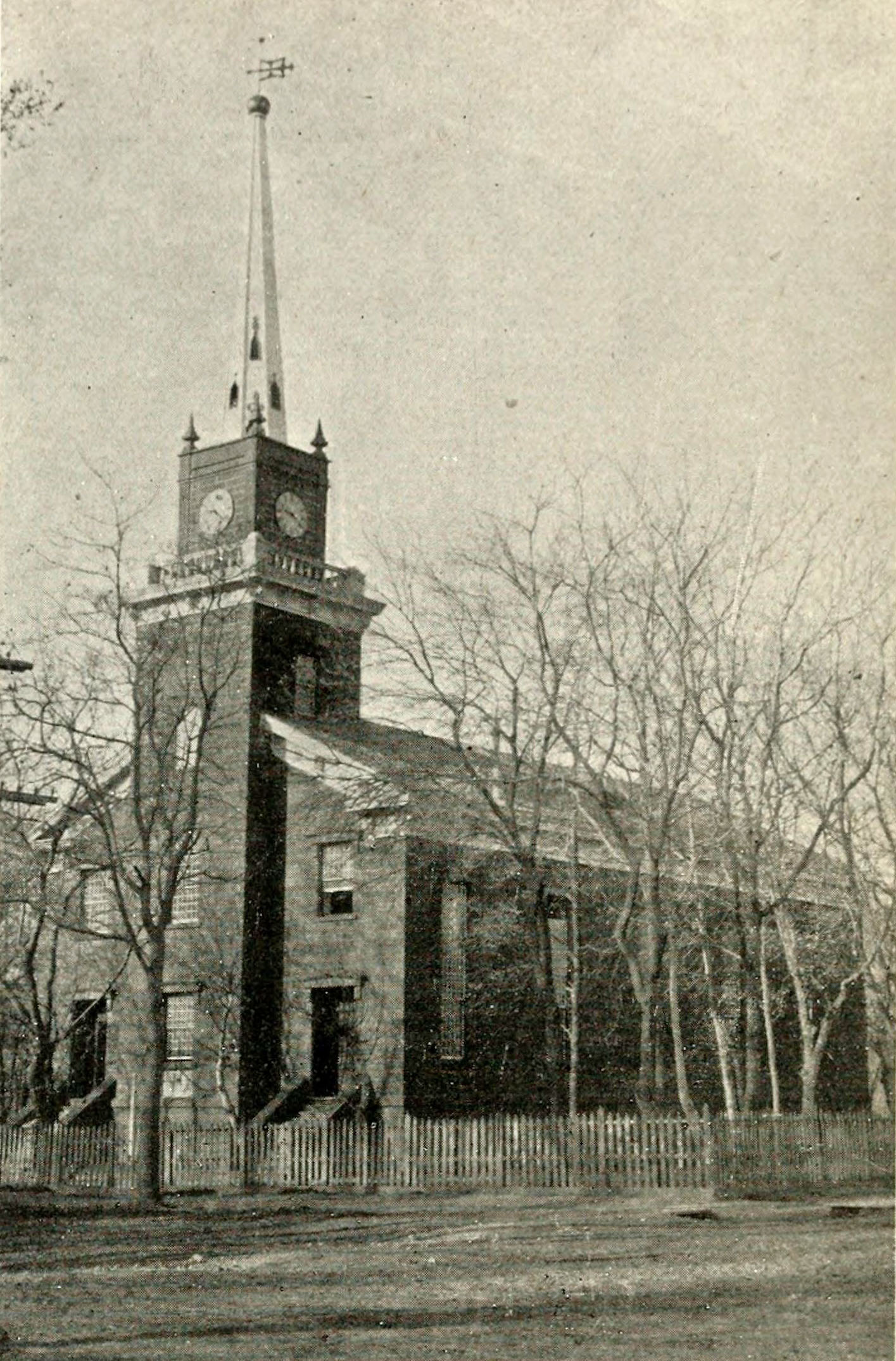
St. George Stake Tabernacle, St. George, Utah (1914)

As a Catholic missionary in the stronghold of the Church of Jesus Christ of Latter-day Saints (LDS Church), Scanlan maintained a cordial relationship with the Mormon community. In 1879, he was invited by John Menzies Macfarlane, a Mormon choir director, to use the new St. George Stake Tabernacle in St. George, Utah, to celebrate mass. Scanlan performed the mass in May 1879, with music sung by the tabernacle choir. In 1885, the Deseret News praised Scanlan for refusing to sign a petition to US President Grover Cleveland that called for restrictions on the LDS Church.

While Scanlan opposed polygamy, a tenet of the LDS Church, Scanlan refrained from being outspoken about his opposition. He told the Irish theologian Walter McDonald that polygamy was "not a whit worse—but better, if anything" than the private lives of some of its critics.

By 1886, Catholicism had grown substantially in Utah. Archbishop Patrick William Riordan petitioned the Vatican to erect an apostolic vicariate in the territory. With the approval of Pope Leo XIII, the Congregation for the Propagation of the Faith established a vicariate to cover the entire Utah Territory, which included parts of eastern Nevada.

=== Apostolic Vicar of Utah ===
On January 25, 1887, Scanlan was appointed vicar apostolic of Utah and titular bishop of Laranda. He received his episcopal consecration on June 29, 1887, from Riordan, with O'Connell and Bishop Patrick Manogue serving as co-consecrators, at St. Mary's Cathedral in San Francisco.

=== Bishop of Salt Lake ===
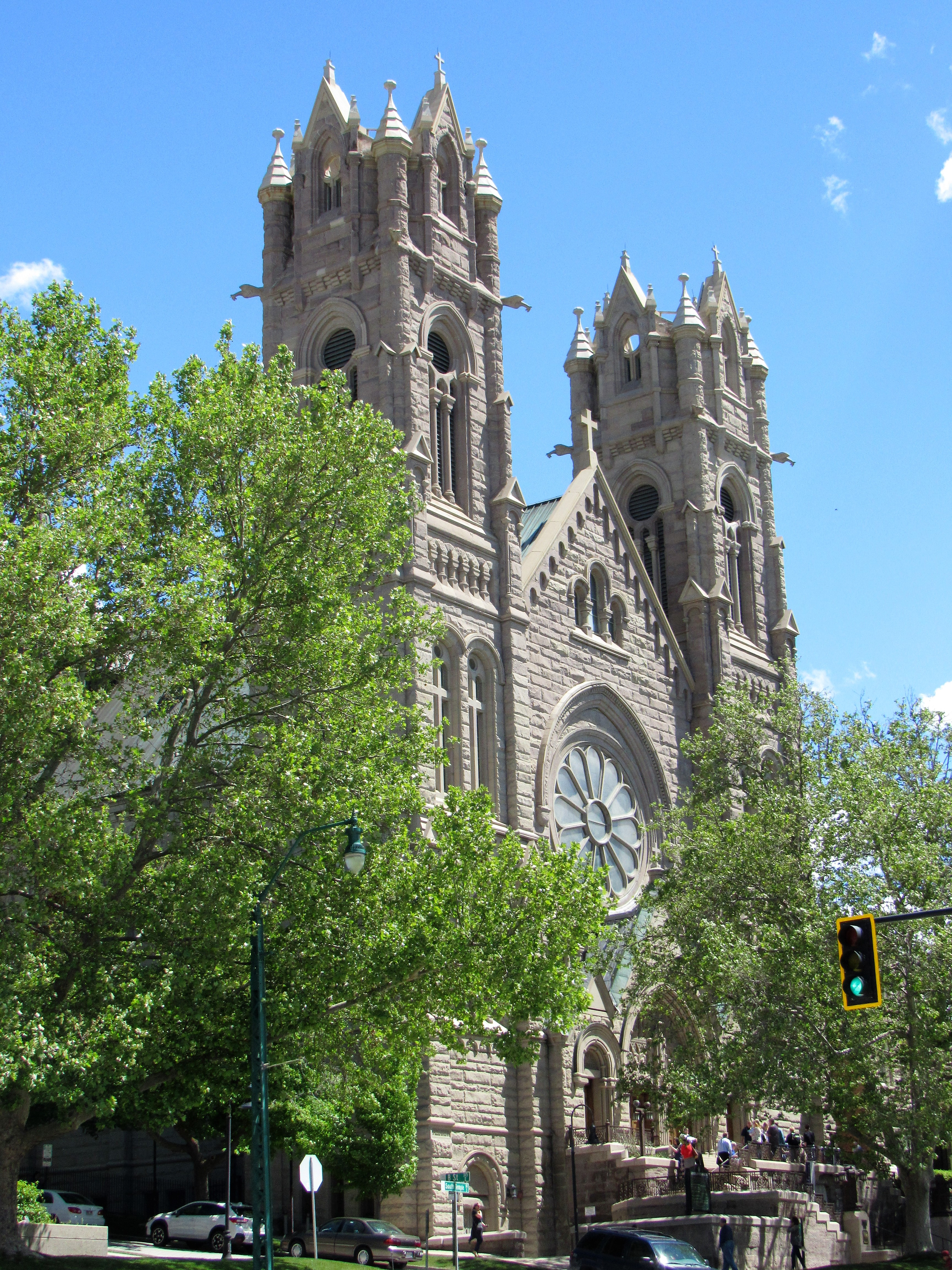
Cathedral of the Madeleine, Salt Lake City, Utah (2019)

On January 30, 1891, Leo XIII converted the Apostolic Vicariate of Utah into the Diocese of Salt Lake, with Scanlan as its first bishop . Having outgrown the original church at Salt Lake City, Scanlan purchased land for a cathedral in 1890. In 1896, Utah achieved statehood. Construction of the new cathedral began in 1900. It was finished in 1909, with Cardinal James Gibbons dedicating the new Cathedral of St. Mary Magdalene on August 15, 1909. The cathedral was the crowning work of Scanlan's tenure, which began with one church and 800 Catholics in 1873 and ended in 1915 with 27 priests, 24 churches, four parochial schools, two hospitals, one orphanage, one boys' college, two girls' academies, and a Catholic population of 13,000.

== Later life and death ==
By 1912, Scanlan was suffering from rheumatism, spending an increasing amount of time at a sanitarium in Arizona, while his vicar general was nearly blind. Following a visit from New York's Cardinal John Farley to Salt Lake City in October that year, Archbishop Riordan of San Francisco received a report from Giovanni Bonzano, the U.S. apostolic delegate, that said the Diocese of Salt Lake had fallen into decline. Riordan asked former U.S. Senator Thomas Kearns to evaluate the situation in Utah and he reported back in March 1913: "There seems to be no head [of the diocese]."

Scanlan eventually agreed to accept a new position from the Vatican as auxiliary bishop in another diocese. Arrangements were made for the appointment of Joseph Sarsfield Glass, a Los Angeles priest, as bishop of Salt Lake. However, Scanlan's health took a turn for the worse before Glass could be formally appointed. Scanlan died on May 10, 1915, at Holy Cross Hospital in Salt Lake City at age 71.

== Episcopal succession ==
Catholic Church titles
Preceded by Office established	Bishop of Salt Lake; 1887–1915	Succeeded by Joseph Sarsfield Glass
