= Reynolds, Nebraska =

Village in Jefferson County, Nebraska, United States

- Village
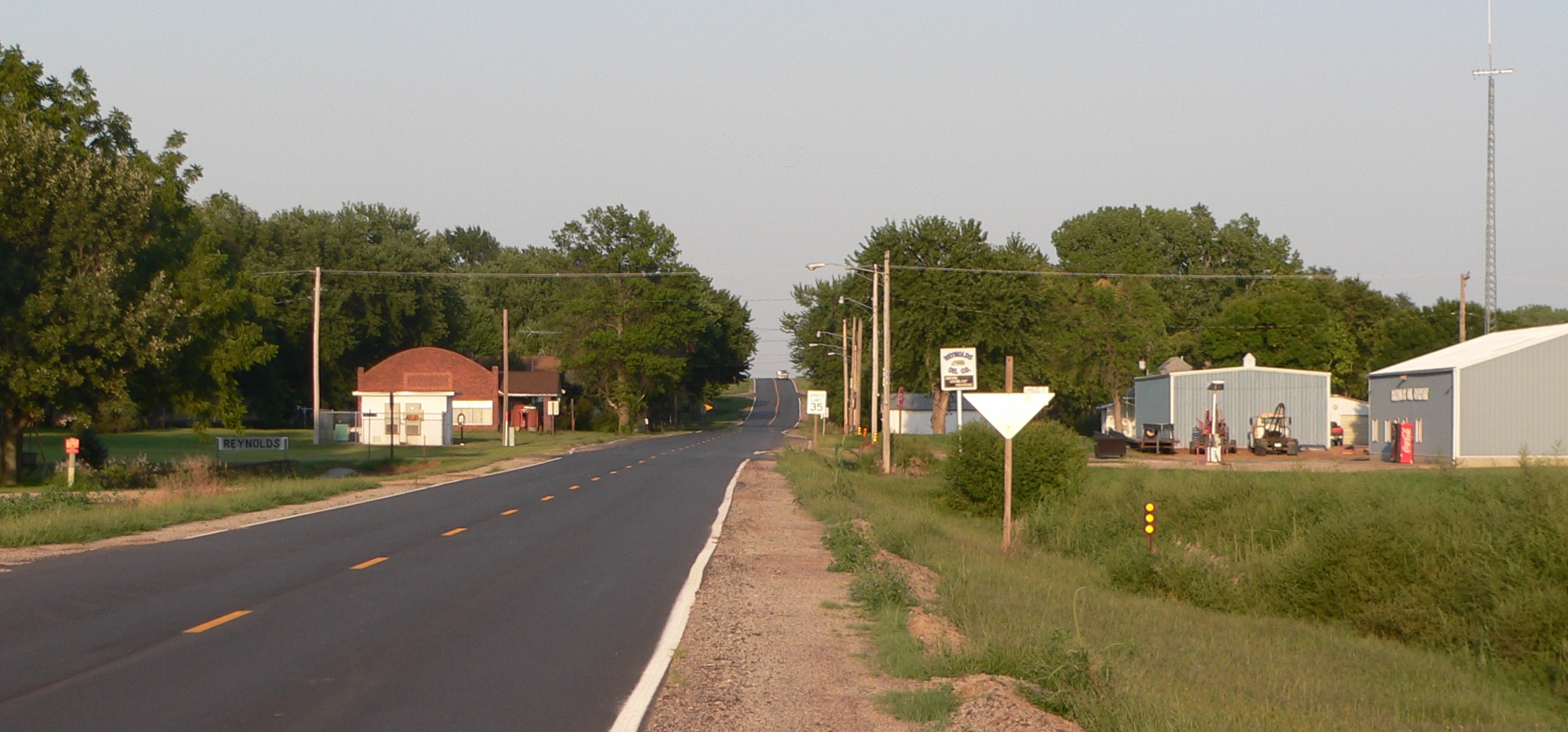
- Reynolds, seen from the west along Nebraska Highway 8

- Location of Reynolds, Nebraska
- Coordinates: 40°03′35″N 97°20′09″W
- Country: United States
- State: Nebraska
- County: Jefferson

Area
  - Total: 0.25 sq mi (0.65 km^{2})
  - Land: 0.25 sq mi (0.65 km^{2})
  - Water: 0 sq mi (0.00 km^{2})
- Elevation: 1,394 ft (425 m)

Population (2020)
  - Total: 59
  - Estimate (2021): 58
  - Density: 226.9/sq mi (87.61/km^{2})
- Time zone: UTC-6 (Central (CST))
  - Summer (DST): UTC-5 (CDT)
- ZIP code: 68429
- Area codes: 402 and 531
- FIPS code: 31-41235
- GNIS feature ID: 2399062

Reynolds is a village in Jefferson County, Nebraska, United States. The population was 59 at the 2020 census.

== History ==
Reynolds was platted in 1880 when the Chicago, Burlington and Quincy Railroad was extended to that point. It was named for the father of a railroad conductor.

== Geography ==
According to the United States Census Bureau, the village has a total area of 0.25 square miles (0.65 km^{2}), all land.

== Demographics ==
Historical population
Census	Pop.	Note	%±
1890	271		—
1900	260		−4.1%
1910	246		−5.4%
1920	208		−15.4%
1930	213		2.4%
1940	211		−0.9%
1950	166		−21.3%
1960	131		−21.1%
1970	115		−12.2%
1980	125		8.7%
1990	104		−16.8%
2000	88		−15.4%
2010	69		−21.6%
2020	57		−17.4%
2021 (est.)	59	▲	3.5%
U.S. Decennial Census

=== 2010 census ===
As of the census of 2010, there were 69 people, 40 households, and 16 families residing in the village. The population density was 276.0 inhabitants per square mile (106.6/km^{2}). There were 46 housing units at an average density of 184.0 per square mile (71.0/km^{2}). The racial makeup of the village was 100.0% White.

There were 40 households, of which 17.5% had children under the age of 18 living with them, 20.0% were married couples living together, 17.5% had a female householder with no husband present, 2.5% had a male householder with no wife present, and 60.0% were non-families. 57.5% of all households were made up of individuals, and 32.5% had someone living alone who was 65 years of age or older. The average household size was 1.73 and the average family size was 2.69.

The median age in the village was 51.2 years. 18.8% of residents were under the age of 18; 5.7% were between the ages of 18 and 24; 15.9% were from 25 to 44; 30.4% were from 45 to 64; and 29% were 65 years of age or older. The gender makeup of the village was 46.4% male and 53.6% female.

=== 2000 census ===
As of the census of 2000, there were 88 people, 44 households, and 24 families residing in the village. The population density was 346.4 inhabitants per square mile (133.7/km^{2}). There were 53 housing units at an average density of 208.6 per square mile (80.5/km^{2}). The racial makeup of the village was 96.59% White, 2.27% Asian, and 1.14% from two or more races.

There were 44 households, out of which 27.3% had children under the age of 18 living with them, 47.7% were married couples living together, 6.8% had a female householder with no husband present, and 43.2% were non-families. 38.6% of all households were made up of individuals, and 20.5% had someone living alone who was 65 years of age or older. The average household size was 2.00 and the average family size was 2.68.

In the village, the population was spread out, with 21.6% under the age of 18, 2.3% from 18 to 24, 27.3% from 25 to 44, 23.9% from 45 to 64, and 25.0% who were 65 years of age or older. The median age was 44 years. For every 100 females, there were 91.3 males. For every 100 females age 18 and over, there were 97.1 males.

As of 2000 the median income for a household in the village was $16,250, and the median income for a family was $37,500. Males had a median income of $45,417 versus $17,500 for females. The per capita income for the village was $15,579. 16.7% of families and 22.8% of the population were living below the poverty line, including 24.0% of those under eighteen and 20.0% of those over 64.

== Notable people ==
- Eddie Hickey - A college men's basketball coach inducted to the Hall of Fame in 1979.
- Duane Garrison Hunt - Roman Catholic Bishop of Salt Lake City from 1937 to his death in 1960.

== See also ==
- List of municipalities in Nebraska
