= William Weigand =

American prelate

His Excellency, The Most Reverend William Keith Weigand
- Bishop Emeritus of Sacramento
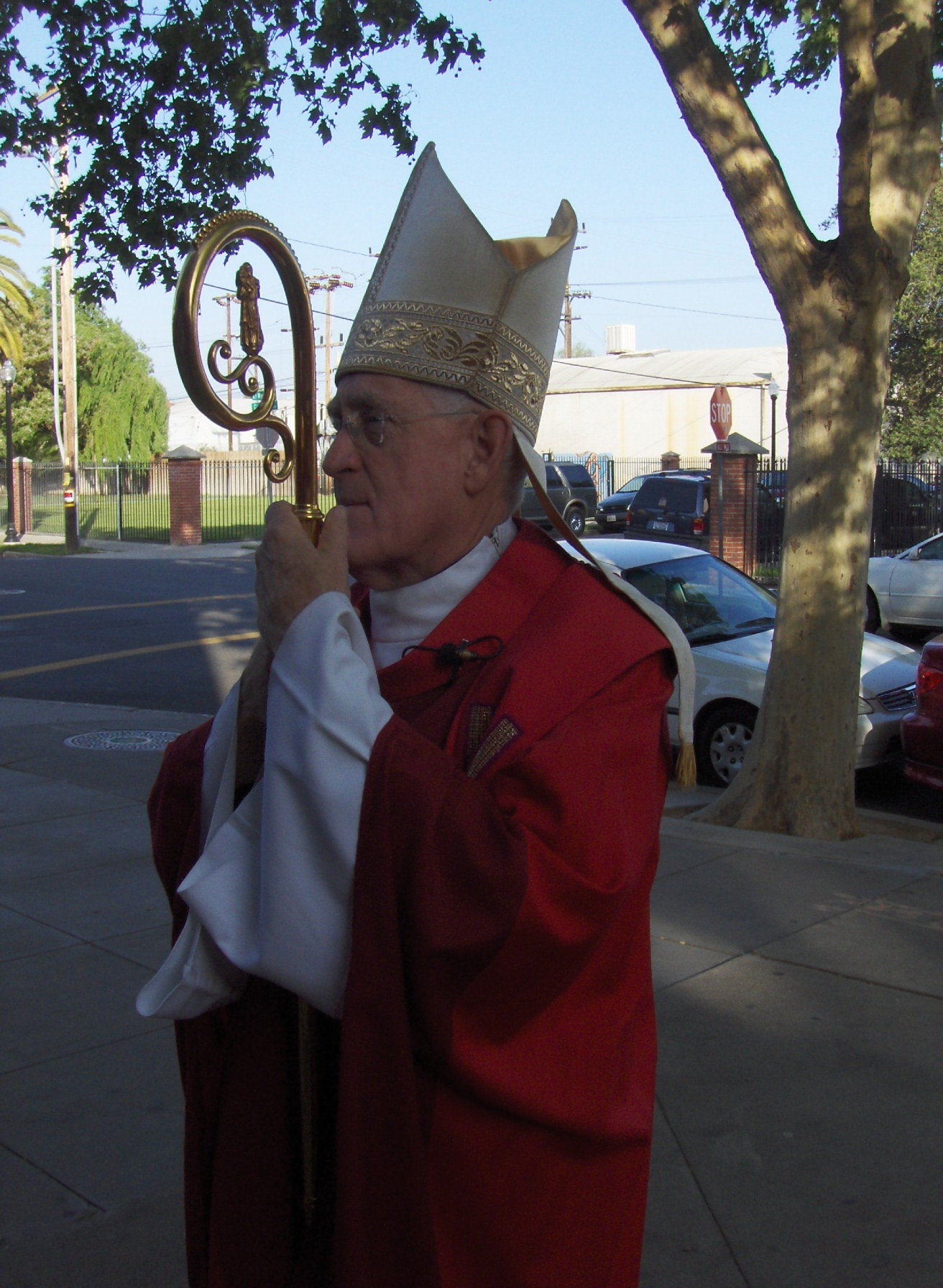
- Bishop Weigand entering St. Joseph Church in Sacramento, California, for a Confirmation Mass.
- Church: Roman Catholic
- Diocese: Sacramento
- Appointed: November 30, 1993
- Installed: January 27, 1994
- Retired: November 29, 2008
- Predecessor: Francis Anthony Quinn
- Successor: Jaime Soto
- Previous post: Bishop of Salt Lake City (1980-1994)

Orders
- Ordination: May 25, 1963 by Sylvester William Treinen
- Consecration: November 17, 1980 by John R. Quinn, Sylvester William Treinen, and Joseph Lennox Federal

Personal details
- Born: May 23, 1937 (age 89) Bend, Oregon, US
- Denomination: Roman Catholic
- Education: Mt. Angel Minor Seminary; St. Edward Seminary; St. Thomas Seminary
- Motto: Feed my lambs

Styles of William Keith Weigand
- Reference style: His Excellency; The Most Reverend
- Spoken style: Your Excellency
- Religious style: Bishop

William Keith Weigand (born May 23, 1937) is an American prelate of the Roman Catholic Church. He served as bishop of the Diocese of Sacramento in California from 1993 to 2008. Weigand previously served as the bishop of the Diocese of Salt Lake City in Utah and as a priest in the Diocese of Boise in Idaho.

== Biography ==
=== Early life ===
Weigand was born on May 23, 1937, in Bend, Oregon, one of four sons of Harold and Alice Weigand. When Weigand was age 12, the family moved to St. Maries, Idaho. He attended St. Maries Academy in Cottonwood, Idaho, a school run by the Benedictine Sisters. In 1951, Weigand entered Mt. Angel Minor Seminary in Saint Benedict, Oregon, for secondary school and two years of college.

In 1959, Weigand graduated from St. Edward Seminary in Kenmore, Washington, with a Bachelor of Arts in philosophy. He then attended St. Thomas Seminary in Denver, finishing in 1963 with a Master of Divinity degree.

=== Priesthood ===
On May 25, 1963, Weigand was ordained to the priesthood for the Diocese of Boise by Bishop Sylvester W. Treinen at St. Mary Immaculate Church in St. Maries, Idaho. His first assignment was at Our Lady of Lourdes Parish in Lewiston, Idaho. However, in 1964, Treinen asked Weigand to serve as vice chancellor of the diocese in Boise. In 1965, Weigand was named chancellor.

Weigand served as a parochial vicar in several parishes in the diocese, and as the administrator of several missions. Weigand served from 1964 to 1968 as the chancellor and vice-officialis of the diocese, and was a member of the diocesan council of presbyters.

In 1968, Weigand moved to Cali, Colombia, to work at a mission run by the Diocese of Boise. In an interview after his retirement, Weigand described his work in Colombia:

“We had a huge challenge to provide religious instruction for youth, to prepare people for Confirmation and marriage. We also established social service ministries that included medical clinics and food pantries. So we had to develop networks of lots of people to help. All these ministries were satellite communities, of sorts, under the umbrella of the parish. It was almost the exact image of a diocese.”

While in Colombia, Weigand started experiencing health issues and requested a return to the United States. In 1978, he was appointed pastor of St. Hubert's Parish in Homedale, Idaho.

=== Bishop of Salt Lake City ===
On September 3, 1980, Pope John Paul II appointed Weigand as bishop of Salt Lake City. He was consecrated on November 17, 1980, by Archbishop John R. Quinn, Bishop Sylvester Treinen and Bishop Joseph Federal at the Salt Palace Convention Center in Salt Lake City, Utah.

Soon after becoming bishop, Weigand was diagnosed with primary sclerosing cholangitis, the source of his health issues. However, he was able to continue as bishop. In 1990, Weigand created one of the strongest sexual abuse policies then in effect in the United States.

Weigand led a $9.7 million restoration of the Cathedral of the Madeleine in Salt Lake City from 1991 to 1993. Aside from repairing and cleaning the cathedral, the restoration aimed at bringing it into compliance with liturgical changes resulting from the Second Vatican Council. The most important change was moving the altar closer to the congregation.

=== Bishop of Sacramento ===
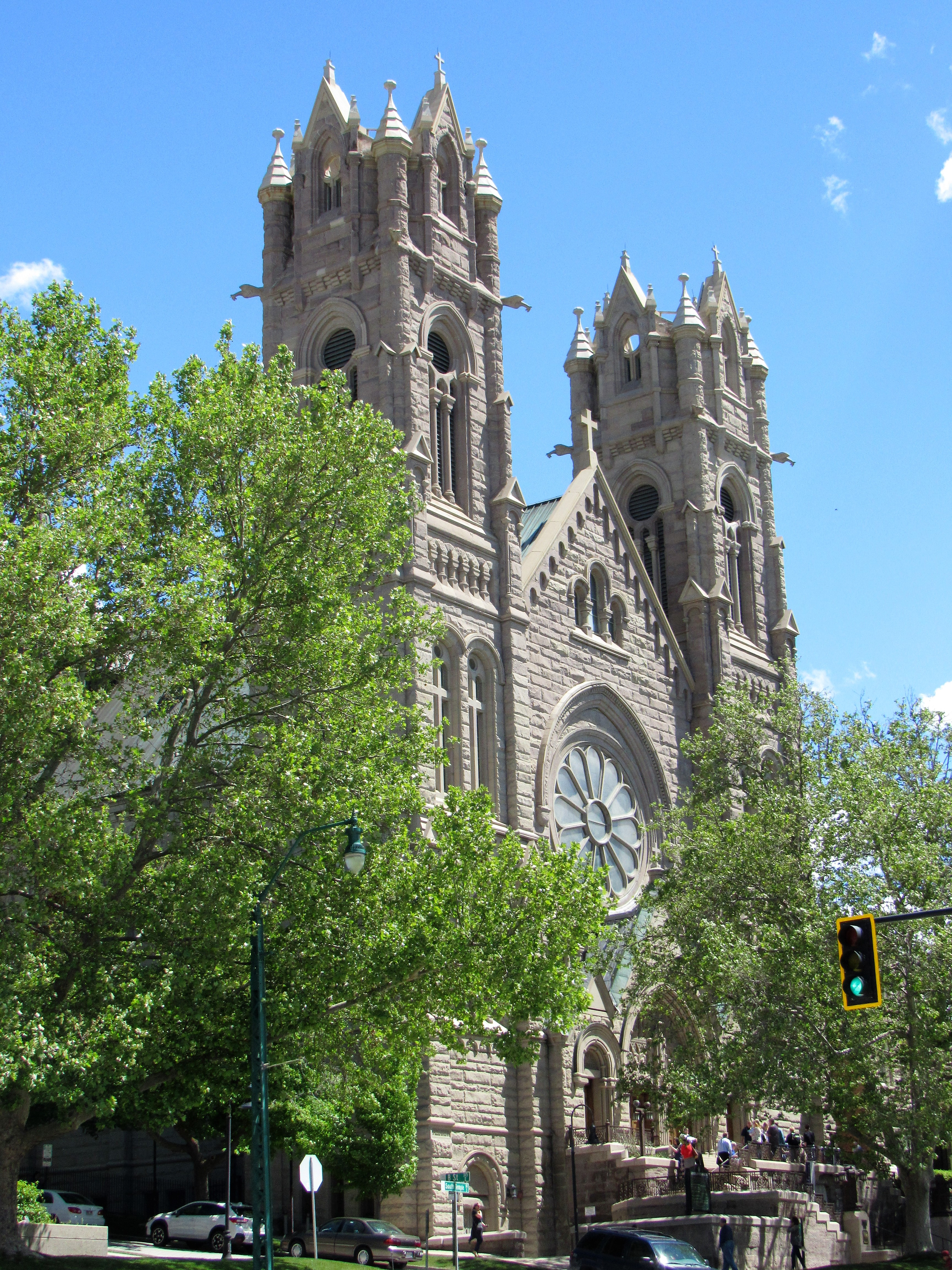
Cathedral of the Madeleine, Salt Lake City, Utah (2019)

On November 18, 1993, Pope John Paul II appointed Weigand as bishop of Sacramento. He was installed January 27, 1994, at the Cathedral of the Blessed Sacrament in Sacramento, California.

In 1996, Weigand celebrated the funeral mass of former Governor Pat Brown. In 2005, as a result of Weigand's primary sclerosing cholangitis, he experienced liver failure. In April 2005, he received a liver transplant. In October 2007, the Vatican named the Most Reverend Jaime Soto, then the Auxiliary Bishop of the Diocese of Orange, as coadjutor bishop to assist Weigand.

=== Retirement ===
In 2008, Weigand submitted a letter of resignation as bishop of Sacramento to Pope Benedict XVI due to health issues. It was granted on November 29, 2008, and on November 30, 2008, Soto succeeded Weigand as bishop of the Diocese of Sacramento.

== See also ==
- Catholic Church hierarchy
- Catholic Church in the United States
- Historical list of the Catholic bishops of the United States
- List of Catholic bishops of the United States
- Lists of patriarchs, archbishops, and bishops

== Episcopal succession ==
Catholic Church titles
Preceded by Francis Quinn	Bishop of Sacramento; 1993–2008	Succeeded by Jaime Soto
Preceded by Joseph Lennox Federal	Bishop of Salt Lake City; 1980–1993	Succeeded by George Hugh Niederauer
