= Oscar Solis =

Filipino American Catholic prelate (born 1953)

His Excellency, The Most Reverend Oscar Solis
- Bishop of Salt Lake City
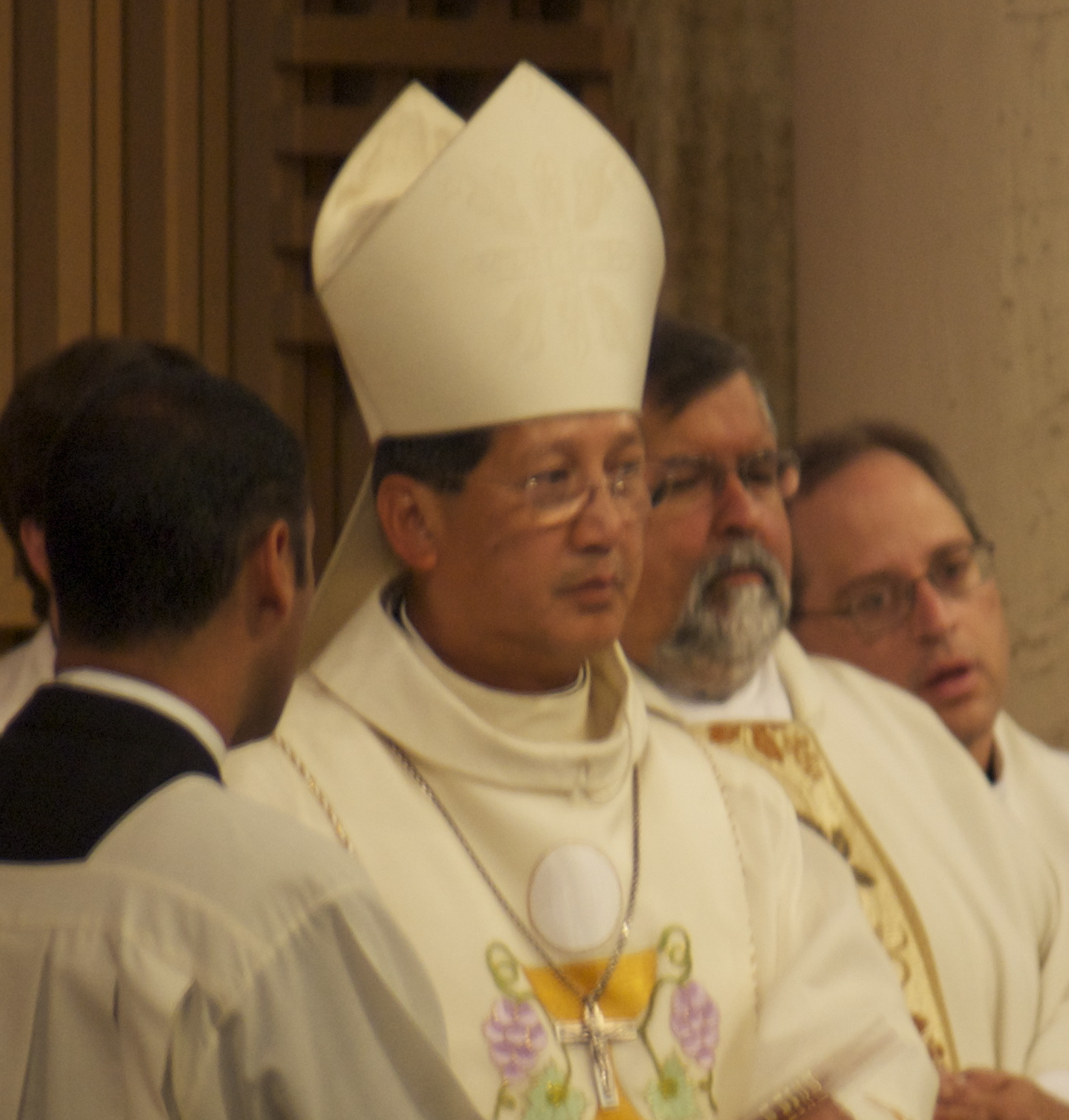
- Solis in 2011
- Diocese: Salt Lake City
- Appointed: January 10, 2017
- Installed: March 7, 2017
- Predecessor: John Charles Wester
- Previous post: Auxiliary Bishop of Los Angeles and Titular Bishop of Urci (2004-2017)

Orders
- Ordination: April 28, 1979 by Vicente Posada Reyes
- Consecration: February 10, 2004 by Roger Mahony, Sam Jacobs, and Charles Michael Jarrell

Personal details
- Born: Oscar Azarcón Solís; October 13, 1953 (age 72) San Jose, Nueva Ecija Philippines
- Education: Christ the King Seminary; Pontifical Royal Seminary of the University of Santo Tomas
- Motto: Fiat voluntas tua (Latin for 'Your will be done')
- Styles
- Reference style: His Excellency; The Most Reverend
- Spoken style: Your Excellency
- Religious style: Bishop

Oscar Azarcón Solís (born October 13, 1953) is a Filipino American Catholic prelate serving as bishop of Salt Lake City in Utah since 2017. He previously served as an auxiliary bishop for the Archdiocese of Los Angeles in California from 2003 to 2017.

Solís is the first Filipino American Catholic bishop and the first Asian American to lead a Catholic diocese. He speaks fluent English, Spanish, and Tagalog.

== Biography ==
=== Early years ===
The son of Antonia Azarcón and Anselmo dela Fuente Solís, Oscar Azarcón Solís was born in San Jose City, Nueva Ecija in the Philippines on October 13, 1953. He has three sisters and a brother, Ronald Solis, who is a Opus Dei priest in Hong Kong, China. Oscar Solis attended grade school at San Jose West Central School in San Jose and high school at Maria Assumpta Minor Seminary in Cabanatuan, Nueva Ecija.

After deciding to enter the priesthood, Solis studied philosophy at Christ the King Seminary in Quezon City and theology at the Pontifical Royal Seminary of the University of Santo Tomas in Manila. He also pursued studies in Asian religions and cultures.

=== Priesthood ===
Solis was ordained a priest of the Diocese of Cabanatuan by Bishop Vicente Posada Reyes on April 28, 1979, at the San Jose Cathedral in San Jose. Between 1979 and 1984, he served in his diocese as rector of the minor seminary, secretary of the priests senate, school chaplain, and director of vocations. Solis immigrated to the United States in 1984 and served for four years as parish vicar at Saint Rocco Parish in Union City, New Jersey, in the Archdiocese of Newark.

Solis relocated to Louisiana in 1988 to serve as associate pastor at St. Joseph Co-Cathedral in Thibodaux. He was incardinated in, or transferred to, the Diocese of Houma-Thibodaux on June 17, 1992. That same year, the diocese assigned Solis as pastor of Our Lady of Prompt Succor Church in Golden Meadow, Louisiana. After six years at Our Lady, Solis was appointed as pastor at St. Joseph Co-Cathedral and St. Luke the Evangelist Parish in Thibodaux.

=== Auxiliary Bishop of Los Angeles ===
On December 11, 2003, Pope John Paul II appointed Solis as titular bishop of Urci and auxiliary bishop of Los Angeles. He was consecrated bishop by Cardinal Roger Mahony at the Cathedral of Our Lady of the Angels in Los Angeles on February 10, 2004, with Bishops Sam Jacobs, and Charles Jarrell serving as co-consecrators. Solis said at the time that he was familiar with Spanish, but he was out of practice speaking it.

In Los Angeles, Solis served as episcopal vicar for ethnic ministry from 2004 to 2009. He chaired and was later a member of the diocese Subcommittee on Asian and Pacific Affairs. He was an organizer of the first National Assembly of Filipino Priests in the United States in November 2011. He has held several positions with the United States Conference of Catholic Bishops.

=== Bishop of Salt Lake City ===
Pope Francis named Solis bishop of Salt Lake City on January 10, 2017, when the position had been vacant for 20 months. He was installed on March 7, 2017.Solis has spoken on the Church of Jesus Christ of Latter-day Saints, the dominant faith in the diocese's territory, saying,

"We value our long-standing relationship with The Church of Jesus Christ of Latter-day Saints. Our communities share a call to social justice and love for the poor. The task before us is one of building and strengthening our inclusive communities of faith. I look forward to continuing a culture of dialogue and encounter that leads us together to God.”

Latter-day Saint Apostles M. Russell Ballard and D. Todd Christofferson spoke about Solis when he was installed as the bishop of Salt Lake City. Ballard said, “We look forward to partnering with Bishop Solis as we stand together and give witness to Jesus Christ as His disciples.” Christofferson added, “We celebrate the installation of Bishop Solis as the leader of the Diocese of Salt Lake City and the newest member of our faith community in Utah."

In 2018, Solis released the pastoral plan for the diocese. It focused on developing a comprehensive vision for strengthening faith formation, promoting vocations to the priesthood and a universal call for holiness to the laity, seeking new ways to support the diocese financially and support the needy, increasing the reverence and devotion of the Eucharist, and upholding the dignity of all in society. Implementation of the plan began in 2018 and was to end in 2023. In 2023, Solis was honored by the Carnegie Corporation of New York's Great Immigrant Award.

== Episcopal succession ==
Catholic Church titles
Preceded by John Charles Wester	Bishop of Salt Lake City; 2017–present	Succeeded by Incumbent
Preceded by –	Auxiliary Bishop of Los Angeles; 2004–2017	Succeeded by –
