= Diocese of Salt Lake City =

Latin Catholic diocese in United States

Coordinates: 40.7500°N 111.8830°W

Diocese of Salt Lake City Diœcesis Civitatis Lacus Salsi

Catholic
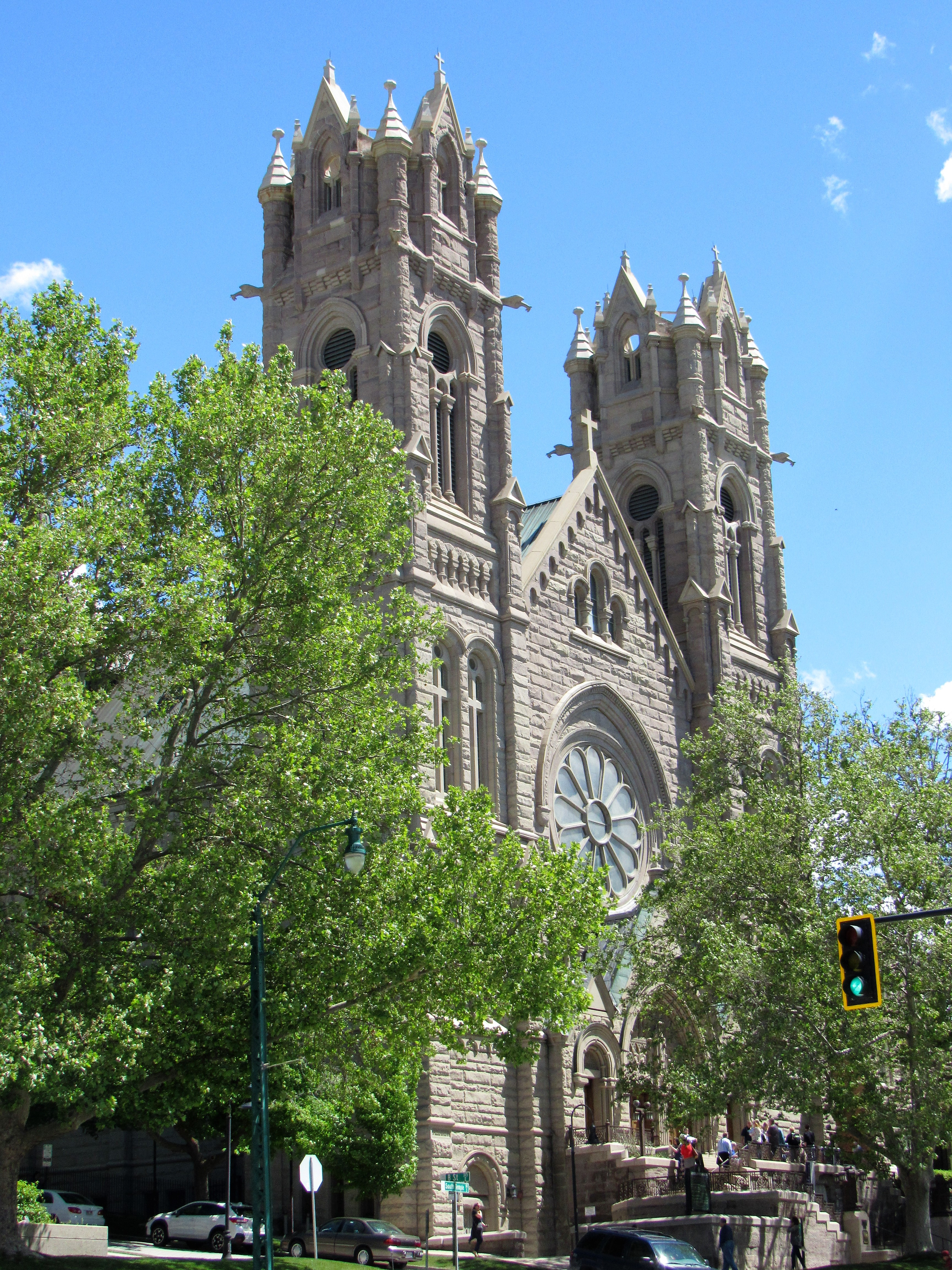
- Cathedral of the Madeleine

- Coat of arms

Location
- Country: United States
- Territory: State of Utah
- Ecclesiastical province: Las Vegas
- Metropolitan: Las Vegas

Statistics
- Area: 84,990 sq mi (220,100 km^{2})
- Population: Total; Catholics: (as of 2020); 3,249,879; 324,988 (10%)
- Parishes: 48

Information
- Denomination: Catholic
- Sui iuris church: Latin Church
- Rite: Roman Rite
- Established: January 27, 1891; 135 years ago
- Cathedral: Cathedral of the Madeleine
- Patron saint: Mary Magdalene

Current leadership
- Pope: Leo XIV
- Bishop: Oscar A. Solis
- Metropolitan Archbishop: George Leo Thomas

Map
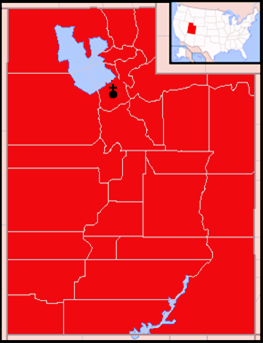

Website
- www.dioslc.org

The Diocese of Salt Lake City (Latin: Diœcesis Civitatis Lacus Salsi) is a diocese of the Catholic Church for the State of Utah in the United States. It is a suffragan diocese of the Archdiocese of Las Vegas. The mother church is the Cathedral of the Madeleine in Salt Lake City. Oscar Azarcon Solis is the bishop.

== History ==
=== 1700 to 1870 ===
The earliest Catholic presence in Utah was the 1776 expedition of Francisco Atanazio Dominguez and Silvestre de Escalante from Santa Fe, New Mexico, to California. They were the first Europeans to enter present-day Utah. In 1859, Bonaventure Keller celebrated the first mass in the Utah Territory, for US Army soldiers at Camp Floyd. Edward Kelly purchased the first church property in Salt Lake City in 1866.

During the 1860s, Catholic immigrants arrived in Utah to work in the mines and build the transcontinental railroad.

=== 1870 to 1880 ===
The first Catholic parish and church were established in 1871 by Patrick Walsh in Salt Lake City. In 1873, Archbishop Joseph Alemany of the Archdiocese of San Francisco sent Lawrence Scanlan to Utah to manage what was then the largest Catholic parish geographically in the country.

Scanlan worked as a circuit rider, visiting the 800 Catholic soldiers, immigrant miners, and railroad workers in the Utah Territory. In 1875, he invited the Sisters of the Holy Cross to Utah. That year, the sisters founded Holy Cross Hospital in Salt Lake City. Today it is Holy Cross Hospital - Salt Lake. They also started St. Mary's Academy in Salt Lake City, which later became College of Saint Mary-of-the-Wasatch. Scanlan purchased property in Ogden in 1875 for Saint Joseph's church, which was dedicated in 1877.

In 1878, Scanlan was named vicar forane by Alemany, making him the superior of the six Catholic priests in the territory. As a Catholic missionary in an area dominated by the Church of Jesus Christ of Latter-day Saints (LDS Church), Scanlan maintained a cordial relationship with the LDS community. In 1879, he was invited by LDS leader John Macfarlane to use the St. George Tabernacle in St. George to celebrate a mass accompanied by the tabernacle choir. Scanlan established St. John's Parish in Silver Reef, a mining town, that same year. At the request of the miners of Silver Reef, he opened the Silver Reef Hospital, staffed by five members of the Sisters of the Holy Cross.

=== 1880 to 1900 ===
St. Mary's Church was constructed in Park City, then a mining town, in 1881. In 1886, Scanlan opened All Hallows College, a minor seminary, at Salt Lake City. He served as a faculty member and lived at the college from 1887 to 1889.

In 1887, Pope Leo XIII erected the Apostolic Vicariate of Utah and Eastern Nevada, taking its territory from the Archdiocese of San Francisco. The pope appointed Scanlan as the apostolic vicar. In 1889, the Marist Fathers assumed control of All Hallows College, operating it until its closure in 1918. On January 27, 1891, Leo XIII suppressed the vicariate and replaced it with the new Diocese of Salt Lake, keeping Scanlan as bishop.

Scanlan broke ground for the new cathedral in 1899. He also opened St. Francis of Assisi church in Provo, the first Catholic church in Utah County. Scanlan established an official newspaper, The Intermountain Catholic, in 1899. Also in 1899, Scanlan opened the Kearns-St. Ann's Orphanage in Salt Lake City. It was named in part after Jennie Judge Kearns, the wife of US Senator Thomas Kearns; she was a major donor to the project. Scanlan started missions and parishes throughout the new State of Utah.

=== 1900 to 1930 ===
The Cathedral of St Mary Magdalene opened in 1909. John and Mary Judge, who owned a silver mine in Park City, established the Judge Mercy Home in Salt Lake City, a hospital for miners, in 1910. Today it is Judge Memorial Catholic High School. Scanlan died in 1915. The second bishop of Salt Lake was Joseph Glass of the Diocese of Monterey-Los Angeles, named by Pope Benedict XV in 1915.

Glass renamed the Cathedral of Mary Magdalene as the Cathedral of the Madeleine. He added distinctly Catholic murals to the building exterior. Some observers said that Glass added the images to confront LDS followers, but others said he simply "wanted to teach Utah Catholics the basic tenets of their faith." Glass died in 1926.

=== 1930 to 1950 ===
In 1926, John Mitty from the Archdiocese of New York was appointed the third bishop of Salt Lake City by Pope Pius XI. Mitty inherited a diocese deeply in debt. Glass had borrowed money to pay the interest on previous debt, and left the diocese owing over $300,000. In 1931, the Vatican transferred the seven counties in eastern Nevada from the Diocese of Salt Lake to the new Diocese of Reno.

To reduce the diocesan debt, Mitty focused on improving the weekly offertory collection. When he left the diocese in 1932, it was beginning to pay off its debts. Mitty's successor was able to finish paying them off in 1936.

After Pius XI named Mitty as coadjutor archbishop of San Francisco in 1932, the pope appointed James E. Kearney of New York to replace him in Salt Lake. Christ the King Parish was established in Cedar City in 1936. In 1937, Kearney was named bishop of the Diocese of Rochester. Duane Hunt of Salt Lake was selected by Pius XI to replace Kearney. A contingent of Benedictine Sisters from Minnesota opened St. Benedict Hospital in Ogden in 1946. Today it is Ogden Regional Medical Center.

=== 1950 to 1990 ===
During his tenure, Hunt helped establish fifteen parishes throughout the state. He also invited such religious institutes as the Carmelites, the Sisters of Charity of the Incarnate Word, and the Trappists to serve in Utah. In 1951, the Vatican renamed the Diocese of Salt Lake as the Diocese of Salt Lake City. Auxiliary Bishop Joseph Federal was named coadjutor bishop of the Diocese of Salt Lake City in 1958 by Pope John XXIII. St. George Church was opened in 1958 to serve visitors to the national parks in Southern Utah.

When Hunt died in 1960, Federal succeeded him as bishop. During Federal's tenure, crews replaced the slate roof of the Cathedral of the Madeleine with copper along with some sandstone blocks and gargoyles. In 1970, he ordered the tolling of the cathedral bells when the hearse carrying the body of LDS President David O. McKay passed by. After 20 years as bishop of Salt Lake City, Federal retired in 1980. The next bishop of Salt Lake City was William Weigand of the Diocese of Boise, named by Pope John Paul II in 1980.

=== 1990 to 2000 ===
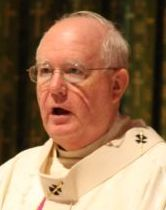
Bishop Niederauer (2008)

In 1990, Weigand created one of the strongest sexual abuse policies then in effect in the United States. He led a $9.7 million restoration of the Cathedral of the Madeleine in Salt Lake City from 1991 to 1993. In 1993, Weigand was appointed bishop of the Diocese of Sacramento. To replace Weigand, John Paul II named George Niederauer as the next bishop of Salt Lake City in 1994.

=== 2000 to present ===
Niederauer became archbishop of San Francisco in 2005. Pope Benedict XVI replaced him in Salt Lake City with Auxiliary Bishop John Wester of San Francisco in 2007. Wester served in Salt Lake City until his appointment as archbishop of the Archdiocese of Santa Fe in 2015.

Auxiliary Bishop Oscar Solis of Los Angeles was appointed to replace Wester in Salt Lake by Pope Francis in 2017. In August 2018, the priest Andrezej Skrzypiec was charged with patronizing a prostitute, a class-A misdemeanor, after being arrested in a police sting operation in Salt Lake City. The diocese suspended him after his arrest.

In January 2025, over 17,000 people attended the Seek25 youth conference in Salt Lake City, sponsored by the Fellowship of Catholic University Students. In November 2025, the diocese investigated a reported miracle at St. Francis Xavier Church in Kearns. A consecrated host sitting in an ablution bowl began to exhibit what looked like bleeding. The diocese determined in December 2025 that the "bleeding" was actually red bread mold.

=== Sexual misconduct ===
In February 2003, brothers Charles and Louis Colosimo sued the Diocese of Salt Lake City, stating that they had been sexually assaulted as children by James F. Rapp from 1968 to 1972. The plaintiffs said that the diocese had received previous complaints about Rapp, but took no actions to protect the children. A judge dismissed the lawsuit the same year, stating that the plaintiffs had waited too long to file the lawsuit and had insufficient proof. In 2016, Rapp was sentenced to 40 years in prison in Oklahoma for sexually assaulting boys.

The priest Mario Arbelaez Olarte of Ogden was arrested in May 2003 in a police sting of social media sexual predators. Arbelaez Olerte was changed with a misdemeanor after arriving to meet with a person he thought was 14-years-old, but was instead a policeman. Olerte pleaded no contest to the charge and agreed to leave the United States.In December 2018, the diocese published a list of 19 diocesan clergy with credible accusations of sexual abuse of boys.

According to an article that appeared in The Salt Lake Tribune in 1993, an Ogden family told the diocese in 1990 that their 14-year-old son had been sexually abused by Ray Devlin, a Jesuit teacher at St. Joseph's High School. The diocese asked the family to stay quiet about the assault; in return, the diocese would send Devlin away for treatment and never assign him near children again. However, in 1993, the family learned that Devlin was serving at a parish in Virginia City, Nevada, with proximity to children. The family contacted the Tribune. After the publication of the article, the Diocese of Reno-Las Vegas removed Devlin from his parish; they sent him to a Jesuit retirement home while permanently suspending him from ministry.

In 2025, the diocese confirmed as credible allegations of sexual abuse against Heriberto Mejia, a priest from Colombia. The male victim said he had been abused by Mejia during the early 1990s. The diocese stripped Mejia of his right to perform public ministry in Utah in 1991; he returned to Colombia in 1992.

== Catholic Community Services of Utah ==
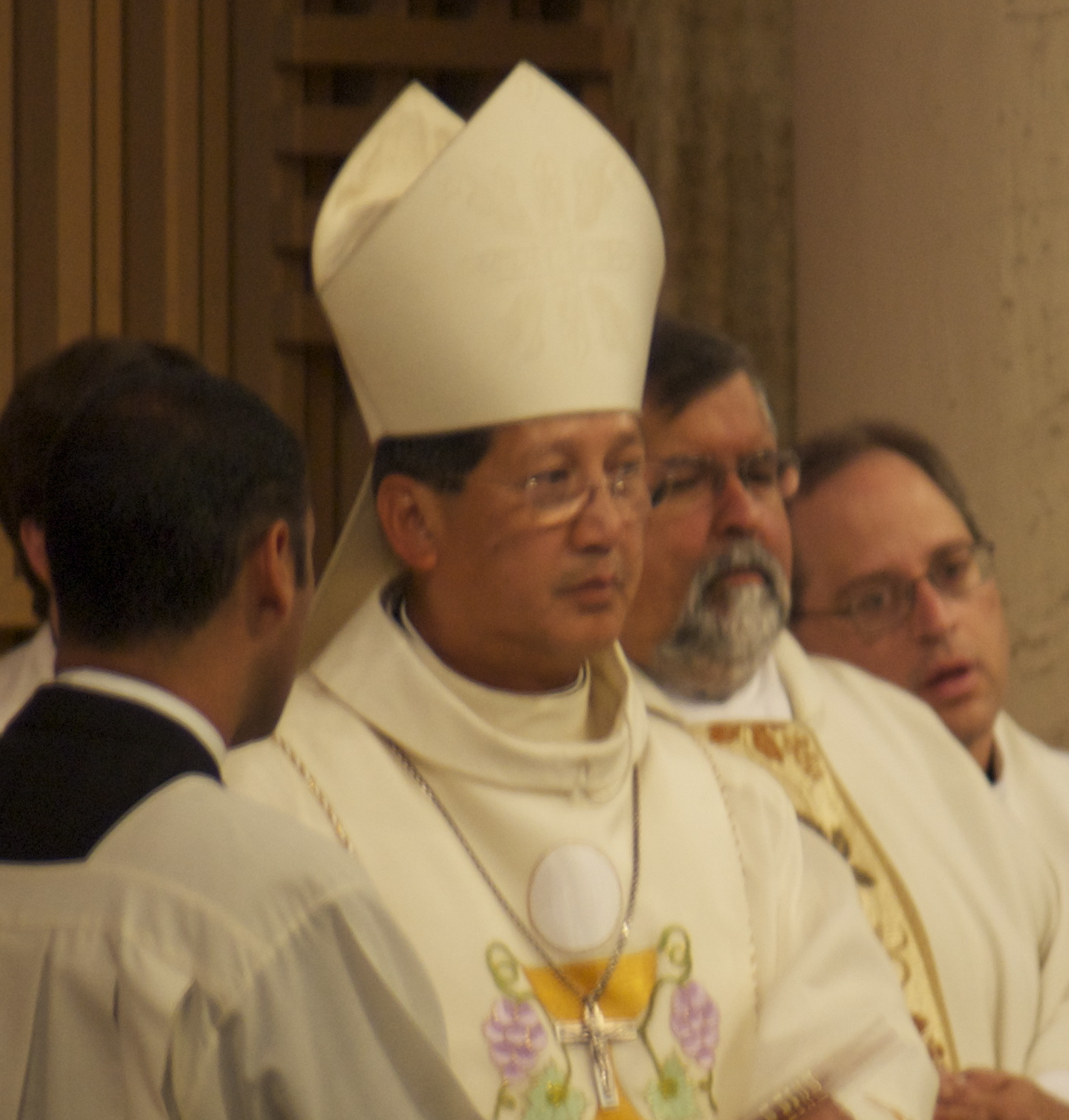
Bishop Solis (2015)

Catholic Community Services (CCS) is a ministry of the diocese. It was founded in 1945 by Duane G. Hunt, who wanted to organize the delivery of charitable aid to the poor and the sick. It has four sites in the state. Its programs include:

- Bishop Weigand Resource Center, a day shelter in Salt Lake City for the homeless
- Bridging The Gap, a mobile food pantry in Walker and Davis Counties
- Immigration, to provide legal services to immigrants
- Joyce Hansen Hall Food Bank in Ogden
- Refugee Foster Care to assist unaccompanied refugee children
- Refugee Resettlement to help newly arrived refugees in Utah
- St. Martha's Baby Project to support new mothers in Salt Lake City
- St. Martha's Baby Project in Ogden
- St. Vincent de Paul Dining Hall to feed the hungry in Salt Lake County
- St. Vincent's Kitchen Academy to teach restaurant cooking skills

== Bishops ==
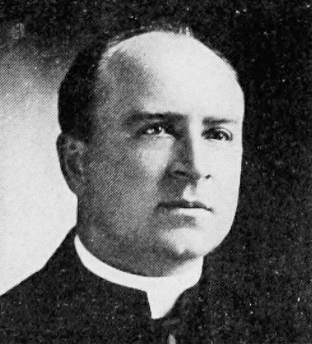
Bishop Glass (1917)

=== Apostolic Vicar of Salt Lake ===
Lawrence Scanlan (1887 – 1915)

=== Bishops of Salt Lake ===
1. Lawrence Scanlan (1887 – 1915)
2. Joseph Sarsfield Glass (1915 – 1926)
3. John Joseph Mitty (1926 – 1932), appointed Coadjutor Archbishop and later Archbishop of San Francisco
4. James Edward Kearney (1932 – 1937), appointed Bishop of Rochester
5. Duane Garrison Hunt (1937 – 1960)

=== Bishops of Salt Lake City ===
1. Duane Garrison Hunt (1937 – 1960)
2. Joseph Lennox Federal (1960 – 1980)
3. William Kenneth Weigand (1980 – 1993), appointed Bishop of Sacramento
4. George Hugh Niederauer (1994 – 2005), appointed Archbishop of San Francisco
5. John Charles Wester (2007 – 2015), appointed Archbishop of Santa Fe
6. Oscar Azarcon Solis (2017– present)

=== Coadjutor bishops ===
- Joseph Lennox Federal (1958 – 1960)

=== Auxiliary bishops ===
- Leo John Steck (1948 – 1950)
- Joseph Lennox Federal (1951 – 1958), appointed coadjutor bishop and later bishop here

=== Other diocesan priests who became bishop ===
- Robert Joseph Dwyer, appointed Bishop of Reno in 1952

== Education ==
As of 2026, the Diocese of Salt Lake City has 12 elementary schools, three high schools and one middle school, all located in Northern Utah.

=== High schools ===
- Juan Diego Catholic High School – Draper
- Judge Memorial Catholic High School – Salt Lake City
- St. Joseph Catholic High School – Ogden

== Religious orders ==
- Rogationists of the Heart of Jesus - Salt Lake City
- Sisters of the Holy Cross - Salt Lake City
- Discalced Carmelite nuns - Salt Lake City
- Order of Preachers - Salt Lake City
- Daughters Of Charity

== Coat of arms ==
Coat of arms of Diocese of Salt Lake City
Escutcheon Azure, on a sea barry-wavy of six argent and of the first, a single masted boat of the second, the sail charged with a cross gules; in dexter chief a comet or Symbolism The arms represent the Great Salt Lake and "the comet of Leo XIII", who established the see.

== Sources and external links ==
- Official website
- The History of the Diocese of Salt Lake City
- Clergy Allegations In the Diocese of Salt Lake City
- Intermountain Catholic - newspaper of the Diocese of Salt Lake City
- Herbermann, Charles, ed. (1913). "Diocese of Salt Lake" . Catholic Encyclopedia. New York: Robert Appleton Company.
