= Joseph Sarsfield Glass =

American prelate

His Excellency, The Right Reverend Joseph Sarsfield Glass C.M
- Bishop of Salt Lake
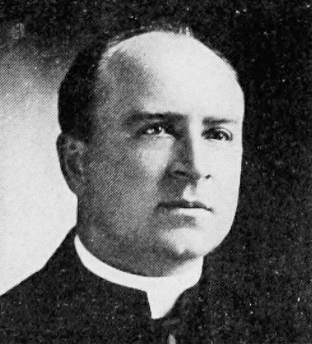
- See: Diocese of Salt Lake
- Appointed: June 1, 1915
- In office: 1915–1926
- Predecessor: Lawrence Scanlan
- Successor: John Joseph Mitty
- Previous post: President of St. Vincent's College (1901 to 1915)

Orders
- Ordination: August 15, 1897 by George Thomas Montgomery
- Consecration: August 24, 1915 by Edward Joseph Hanna

Personal details
- Born: March 13, 1874 Bushnell, Illinois, US
- Died: January 26, 1926 (aged 51) Los Angeles, California, US
- Denomination: Roman Catholic
- Education: St. Vincent's College; Pontifical Urban University
- Motto: Fortitudo et pax (Strength and peace)

Styles of Joseph Sarsfield Glass
- Reference style: The Most Reverend
- Spoken style: Your Excellency
- Religious style: Bishop
- Posthumous style: none

Joseph Sarsfield Glass, C.M. (March 13, 1874 – January 26, 1926) was an American prelate of the Roman Catholic Church. He served as bishop of the Diocese of Salt Lake in Utah from 1915 until his death in 1926. He was a member of the Congregation of the Mission (Vincentians)

== Biography ==
=== Early life ===
Glass was born in on March 13, 1874, in Bushnell, Illinois, to James and Mary Edith (née Kelly) Glass. After receiving his early education in Sedalia, Missouri, he entered St. Vincent's College at Los Angeles, California, in 1887. He returned to Missouri in 1891, enrolling at St. Mary's Seminary in Perryville. From there he joined the Vincentians.

=== Priesthood ===
Loyola Marymount University (formerly St. Joseph College), Los Angeles

Glass was ordained to the priesthood for the Vincentians in Los Angeles, California, by Bishop George Montgomery on August 15, 1897. The Vincentians then sent Glass to Rome to study at the College of the Propaganda in Rome, where he earned his Doctor of Divinity degree in 1899.

Upon his return to the United States, Glass was assigned to teach dogmatic theology at St. Mary's Seminary. In 1900, he was appointed as professor of moral theology and director of the seminarians. In June 1901 he was named president of St. Vincent's College and pastor of St. Vincent's Parish, both in Los Angeles.St. Vincent College is today Loyola Marymount University. During his presidency, Glass broadened the curriculum to a full university course and made it one of the most prominent educational institutions in Southern California.

=== Bishop of Salt Lake ===
On June 1, 1915, Glass was appointed the second bishop of Salt Lake by Pope Benedict XV. He received his episcopal consecration at Saint Vincent's Church in Los Angeles on August 24, 1915, from Archbishop Edward Hanna, with Bishops Thomas Lillis and Thomas Grace serving as co-consecrators.

As bishop, Glass added murals to the Cathedral of the Madeleine in Salt Lake that display distinctly Catholic beliefs; some claimed that he wanted to confront members of the Church of Jesus Christ of Latter-day Saints (LDS Church), but others said he simply "wanted to teach Utah Catholics basic tenets of their faith." Glass once played a poker game with LDS President Heber J. Grant and Elmer Goshen of the First Congregational Church in Salt Lake.

=== Death and legacy ===
Joseph Glass died in Los Angeles on January 26, 1926, at age 51.

Catholic Church titles
| Preceded by Lawrence Scanlan | Bishop of Salt Lake City; 1915—1926 | Succeeded by John Joseph Mitty |
