= Cathedral of the Madeleine =

Historic church in Salt Lake City, Utah, United States

- U.S. National Register of Historic Places
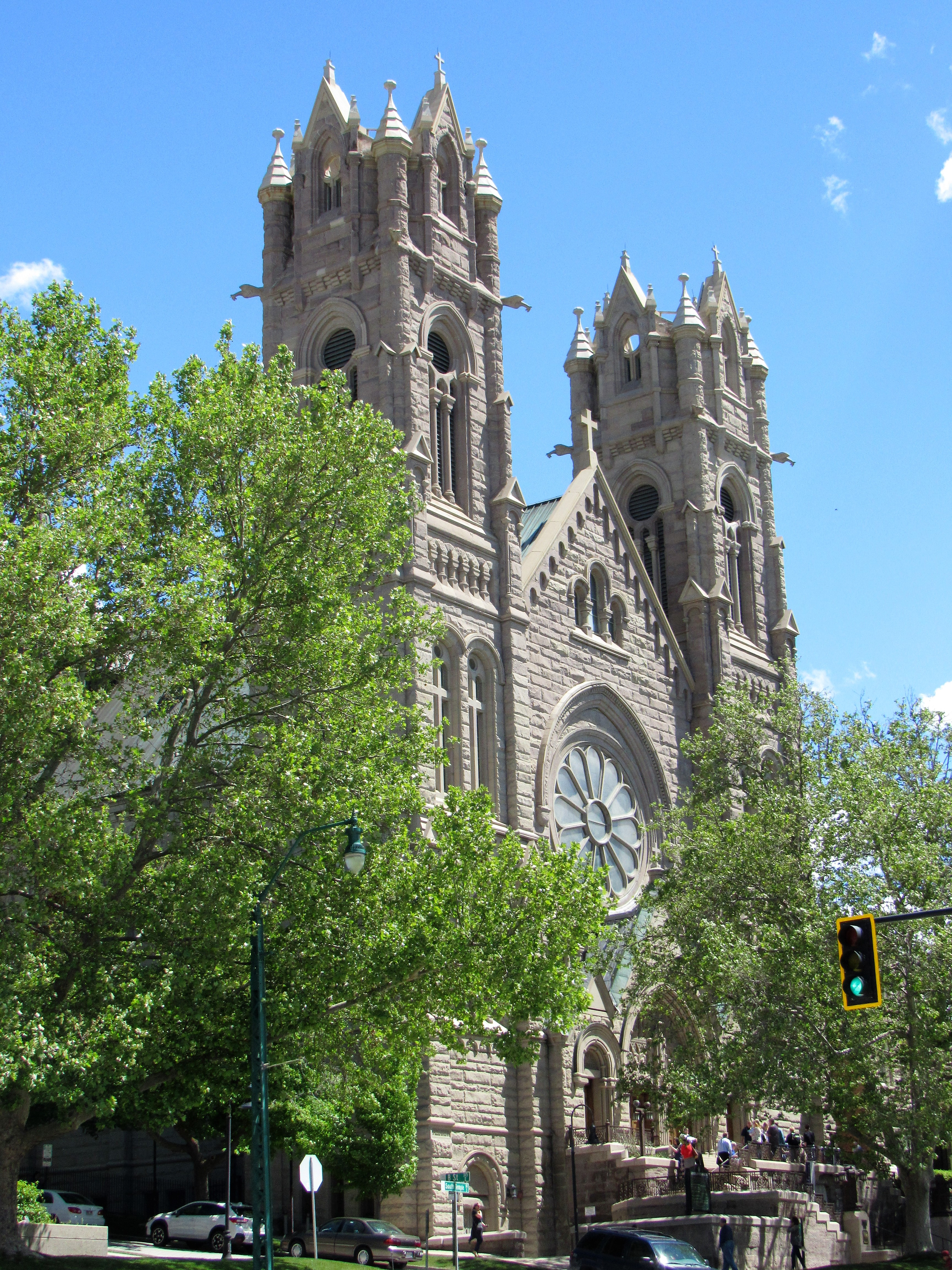
- Cathedral of the Madeleine in May 2019

- Location within Utah Location within the United States
- Location: 331 East South Temple Street; Salt Lake City, Utah; United States
- Coordinates: 40°46′11″N 111°52′54″W
- Area: 1.2 acres (0.49 ha)
- Built: 1900-09
- Architect: Carl M. Neuhausen and Bernard O. Mecklenburg
- Architectural style: Neo-Romanesque (outside) and Neo-Gothic (inside)
- NRHP reference No.: 71000845
- Added to NRHP: March 11, 1971

The Cathedral of the Madeleine is a Catholic cathedral in Salt Lake City, Utah, in the United States. It was completed in 1909 and is the cathedral, or mother church, of the Diocese of Salt Lake City.

The Cathedral of the Madeleine is the only American cathedral that is under the patronage of St. Mary Magdalene.

== History ==
=== 1890 to 1990 ===
On January 27, 1891, Pope Leo XIII erected the Diocese of Salt Lake and appointed Lawrence Scanlan as its first bishop. He hired the architects Carl M. Neuhausen and Bernard O. Mecklenburg of Salt Lake City to design its new cathedral. Scanlan had purchased a property in Salt Lake City for a new cathedral in 1890, paying $35,000.

Mary Magdalene was chosen as the patron saint of the new cathedral, with a feast day of July 22. That date falls two days before Pioneer Day, a celebration commemorating the arrival of the Mormon pioneers in Salt Lake Valley. Therefore, it is speculated that the diocese wanted Catholics to join with Mormons in celebrations around the same time.

The cathedral construction began in 1900 and was completed in 1909. The construction cost was $344,000. The Cathedral of the Madeleine was dedicated in 1909 by Cardinal James Gibbons of the Archdiocese of Baltimore.

In 1915, Bishop Joseph S. Glass undertook extensive decoration of the interior of the new cathedral. He hired the architect John T. Comès of Pittsburgh, Pennsylvania, for the job. In 1916, Glass also changed the name of the cathedral from Magdalene to Magdalein after visiting the purported tomb of that saint in France. Comès added several shrines to the cathedral in 1917, with woodworking by the American artist Johannes Kirchmayer. Murals by Felix Lieftuchter were also installed at this time.

=== 1990 to present ===
Bishop William K. Weigand undertook an extensive cleaning of the cathedral interior in 1991. He also constructed a new altar, moved the cathedra, added a new baptismal font, and created a Blessed Sacrament Chapel in the cathedral. Many of these changes were prompted by liturgical reforms following the Second Vatican Council of the early 1960s.

The 1991 renovation was supported in part by a $500,000 matching-fund donation from businessman and philanthropist James LeVoy Sorenson, which helped advance the cathedral’s restoration campaign.

Other major changes from the 1991 renovation included the creation of a plaza outside the cathedral, the seismic refitting of the structure, the construction of Scanlan Hall, and the rebuilding of the lower level of the building.

During the cathedral’s 1993 rededication ceremonies, Roger Mahony noted that many non-Catholics had contributed to the restoration project, including financial support from The Church of Jesus Christ of Latter-day Saints and the Episcopal Diocese of Utah. Representatives of these faiths, including Thomas S. Monson, participated in the ceremony.

In 2024, a small relic of St Mary Magdalene was stolen from the cathedral. It was never recovered

On July 20, 2026, the cathedral's rector, Fr. Christopher Gray, announced that a new bone relic of St. Mary Magdalene with full ecclesiastical documentation had been obtained for the cathedral. The relic was previously housed at the St. Charles Borromeo Seminary in Philadelphia.

== Music ministries ==
=== Madeleine Choir School ===
The cathedral is home to the Madeleine Choir School, the only co-educational Catholic choir School in the United States. Founded in 1996, the school serves from pre-K to eighth grade.

=== Cathedral Choir ===
The Cathedral Choir has recorded several CDs. It has performed at St. Peter's Basilica in Rome, Notre Dame de Paris in Paris and at churches across the United States and Europe.

== Cathedral exterior ==
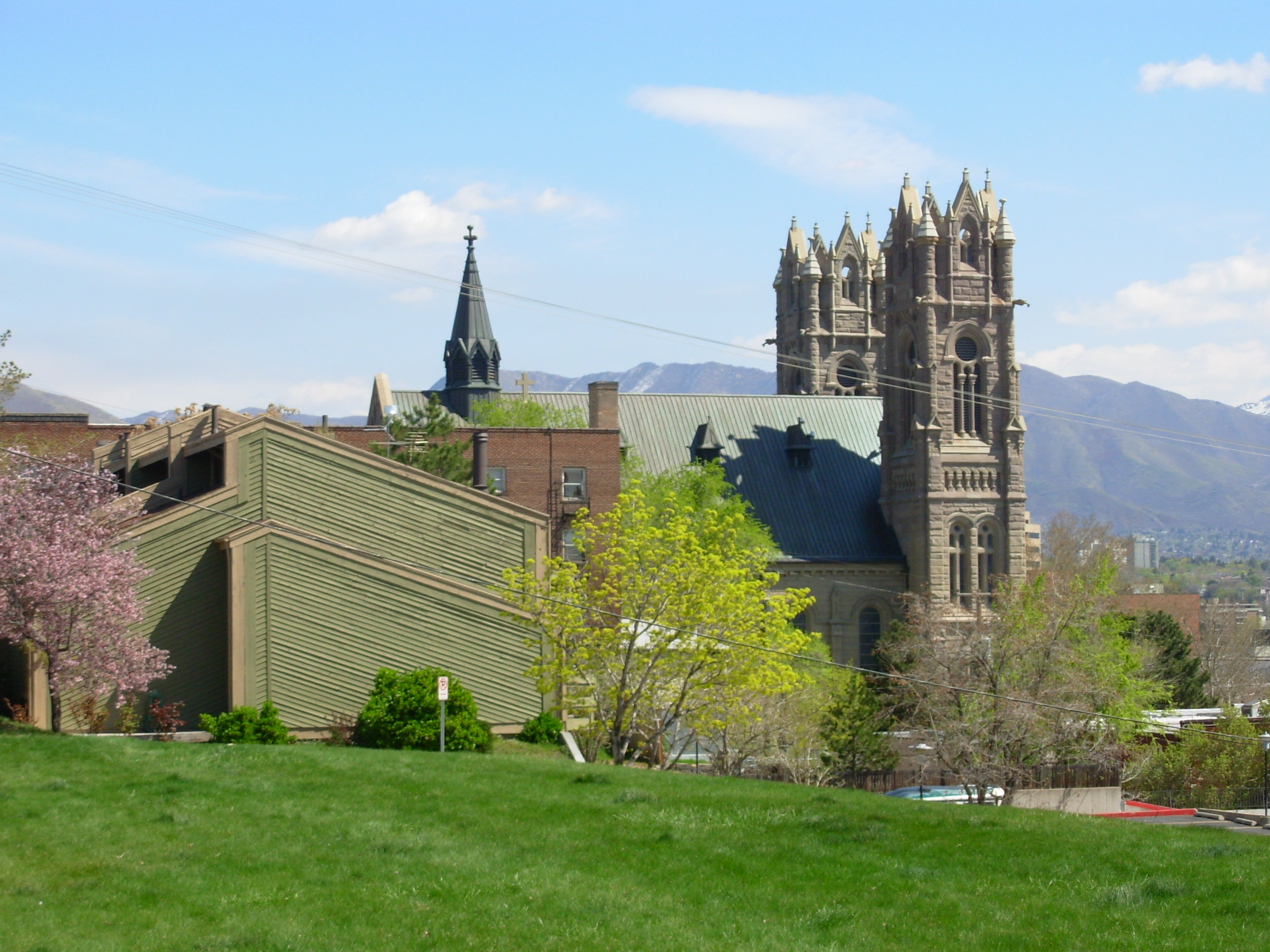
Exterior, Cathedral of the Madeleine (2007)

=== Bells ===
The cathedral has four bells installed in the west tower; they are named after St. Joseph, Mary, Mother of Jesus, St. Cecilia and St. Michael. The Joseph and Mary bells were installed in 1917 by the Maryland Brass Foundry, the remaining two in 1993 by the Verdin Company of Cincinnati, Ohio.

=== Facade ===
The cathedral facade is made of sandstone from Utah, restored in 1975.The exterior is predominantly a Neo-Romanesque design.

=== Gargoyles ===
The east and west towers of the cathedral display eight gargoyles. Manufactured of steel-reinforced concrete, the gargoyles were installed in 1993. They replaced the original gargoyles from 1917, which had been weathered beyond restoration.

=== Tympanum ===
The tympanum is a carved stone feature over the main doors of the cathedral that was created by Francis Aretz of Pittsburgh. It features Christ as a high priest, flanked by angels and the twelve apostles. The four doctors of the Church (Augustine of Hippo, Jerome of Stridon, Ambrose of Milan and Gregory of Nyssa) are depicted in the upper part of the tympanum.

== Cathedral interior ==
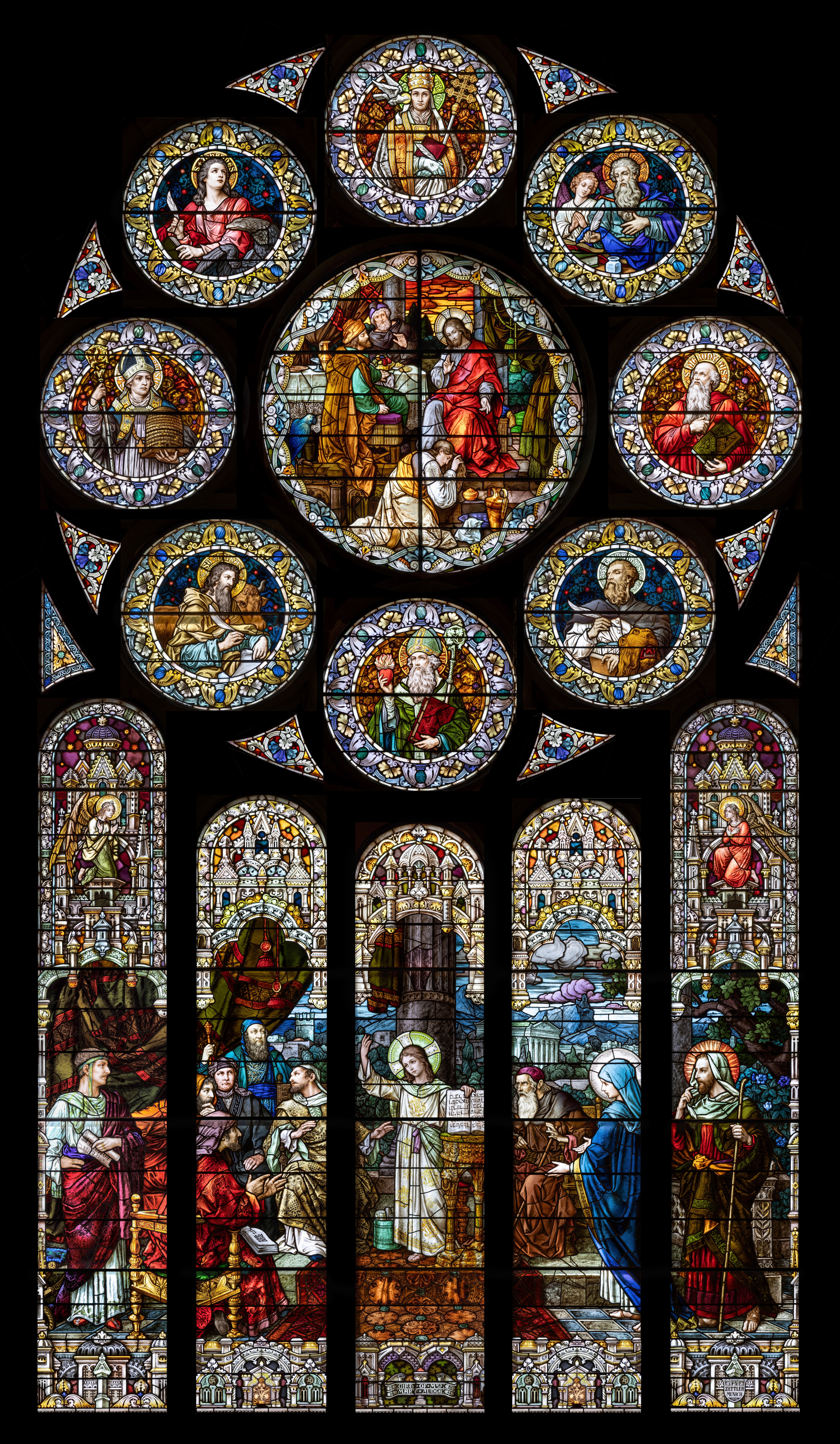
West transept window, The Finding of Jesus in the Temple (2024)

=== Chapels ===
==== Blessed Sacrament Chapel ====
The Blessed Sacrament Chapel is located behind a screen in the cathedral chancel. The chapel contains the tomb of Bishop Scanlan along with the tabernacle. The tabernacle is situated in a tower-like structure; it contains the blessed sacrament for the sick and for those worshippers wanting to participate in private veneration.

==== Lady Chapel ====
Located on the west side of the cathedral sanctuary, the Lady Chapel has three carved scenes

- The flight of Mary, Joseph and Jesus into Egypt
- The Holy Family
- The child Jesus in the Temple of Jerusalem

The Lady Chapel also contains statues of the following saints:

- St. Lawrence
- St. Bernard
- St. Bonaventure
- St. Bartholomew
- St. John Vianney
- St. Blaise

=== St. Joseph Chapel ===
The St. Joseph Chapel is located on the east side of the sanctuary. It contains three carved scenes of the Nativity:

- the annunciation to the shepherds
- the birth of Christ
- the adoration of the Magi

The St. Joseph Chapel also contains the following wooden statues of saints:

- Nicholas of Tolentino
- Anthony the Great
- James the Great
- St. Martin
- Dominic de Guzmán
- Pope Sylvester I

=== Chancel ===
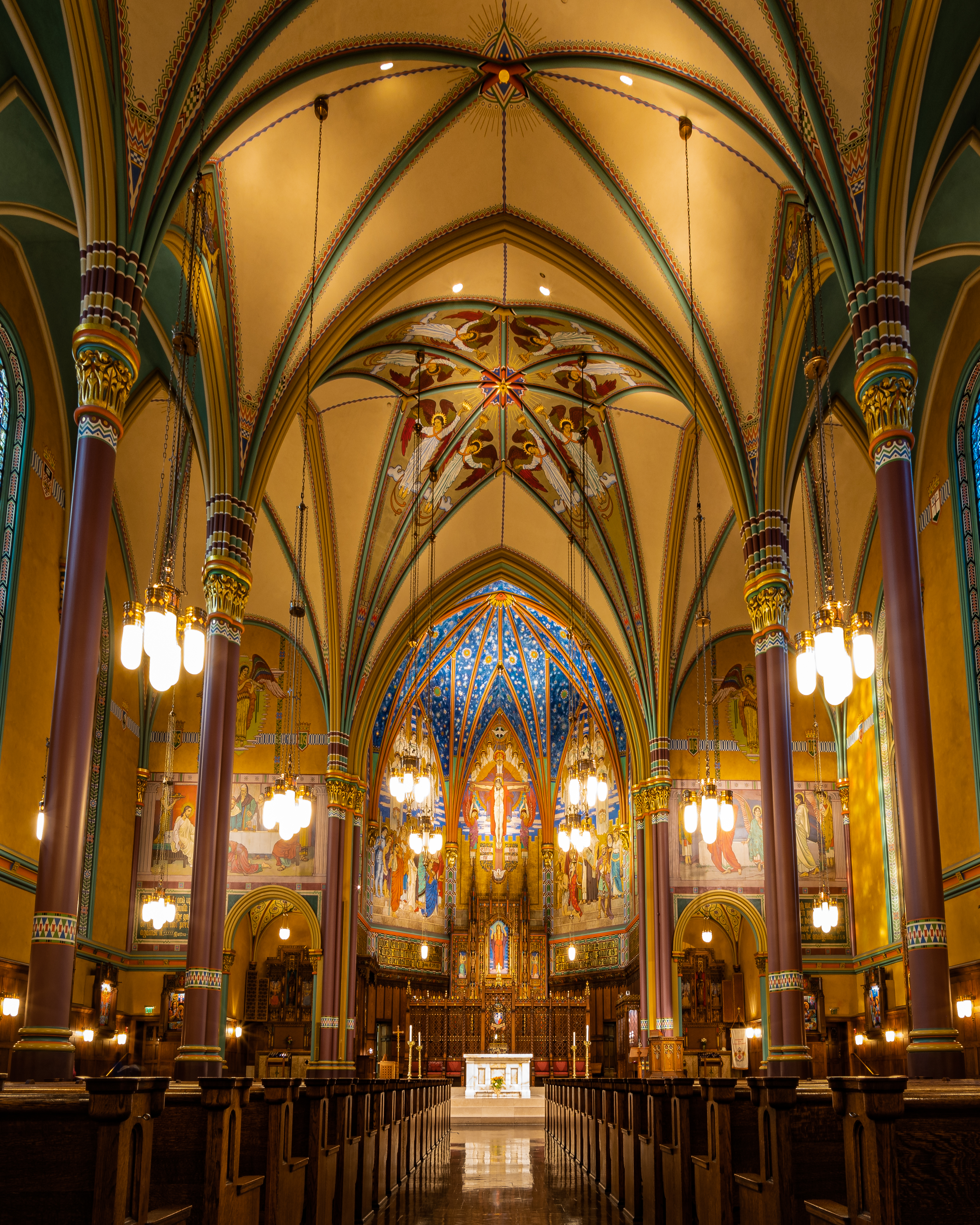
Chancel and main altar (2019)

The chancel in the cathedral contains the main altar, constructed of Carrara marble and inlaid with glass mosaic. Four large chandeliers, designed by Roger Morgan of New York City in 1993, are installed over the altar. The altar contains two relics:

- Gratus of Aosta, an Italian bishop and saint from the 5th century
- St. Fenusta, a martyr during the Roman Empire

The chancel is separated from the Blessed Sacrament Chapel by a screen of white oak that was carved by Agrell Architectural Carving. Located above the main altar are wood carvings of the founders of several religious institutes: Benedict of Nursia, Clare of Assisi and Dominic de Guzmán on the east side and Ignatius of Loyola, Terese of Avila and Francis of Assisi on the west side. All of these carvings were created by Johannes Kirchmayer.

=== Stations of the Cross ===
The fourteen Stations of the Cross are paintings that depict what happened to Christ on the day of his crucifixion. They were created by the American painter Roger Cross between 1992 and 1993. The picture frames were created in 1918 by the William F. Ross and Company of East Cambridge, Massachusetts. The Cross paintings replaced a series of paintings created in 1918 that were beyond restoration.

Cathedral images

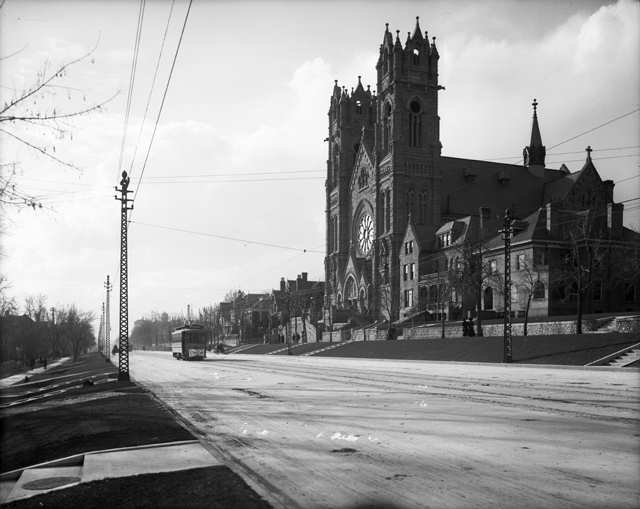
Cathedral of the Madeline (1908)

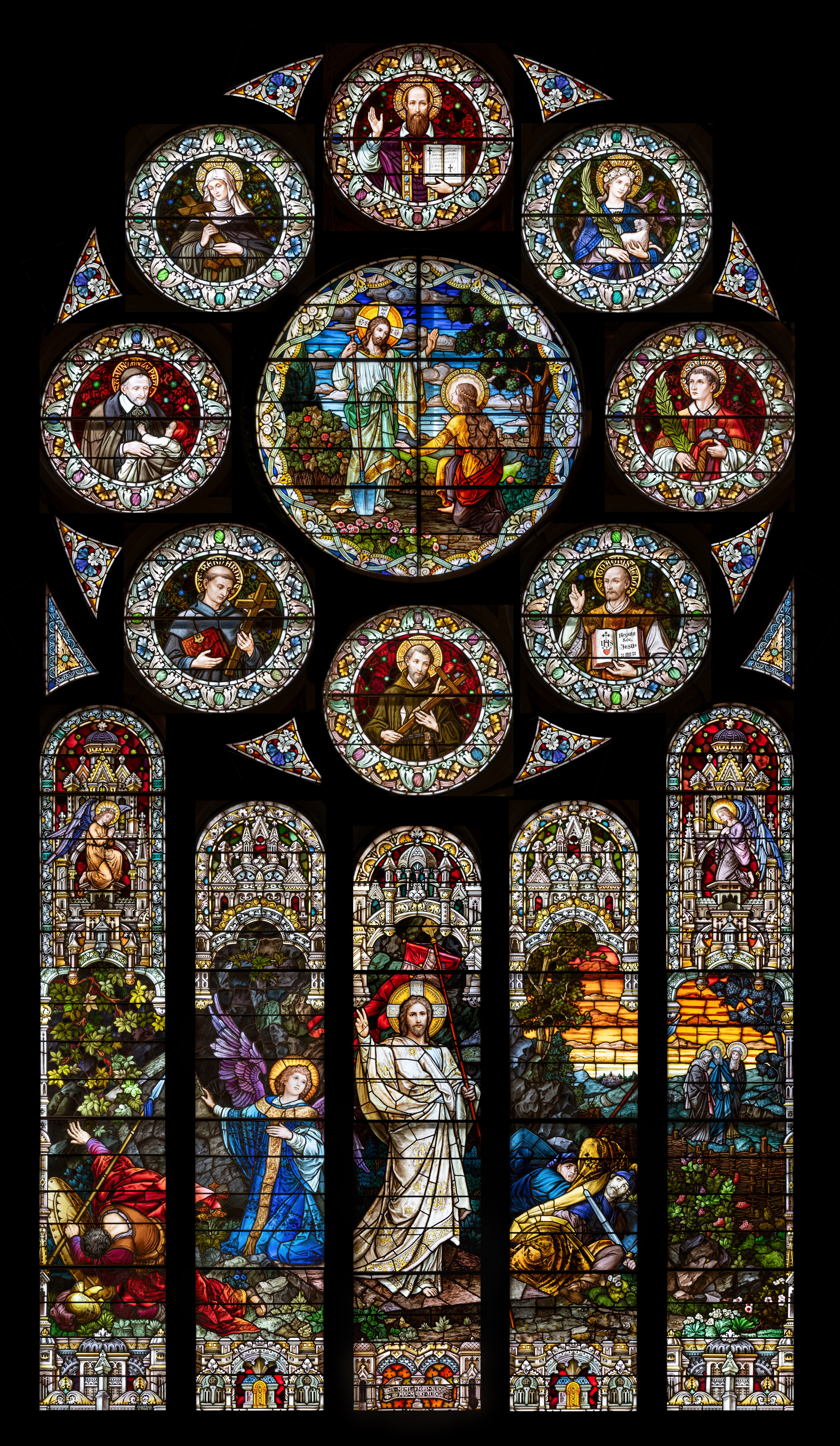
East transept window, Glorious Mystery (2024)

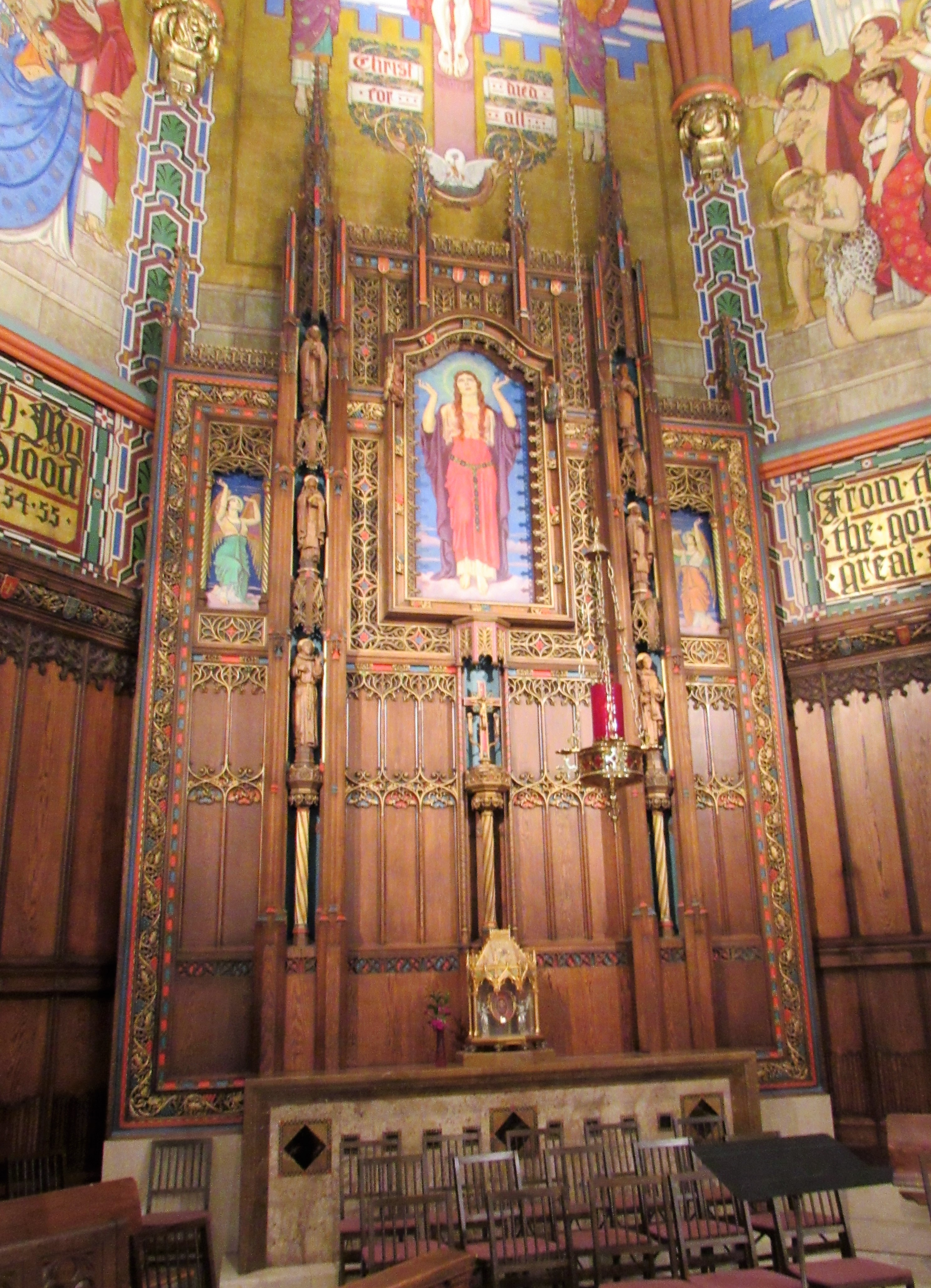
Reredos and Bishop Scanlan's tomb (2019)

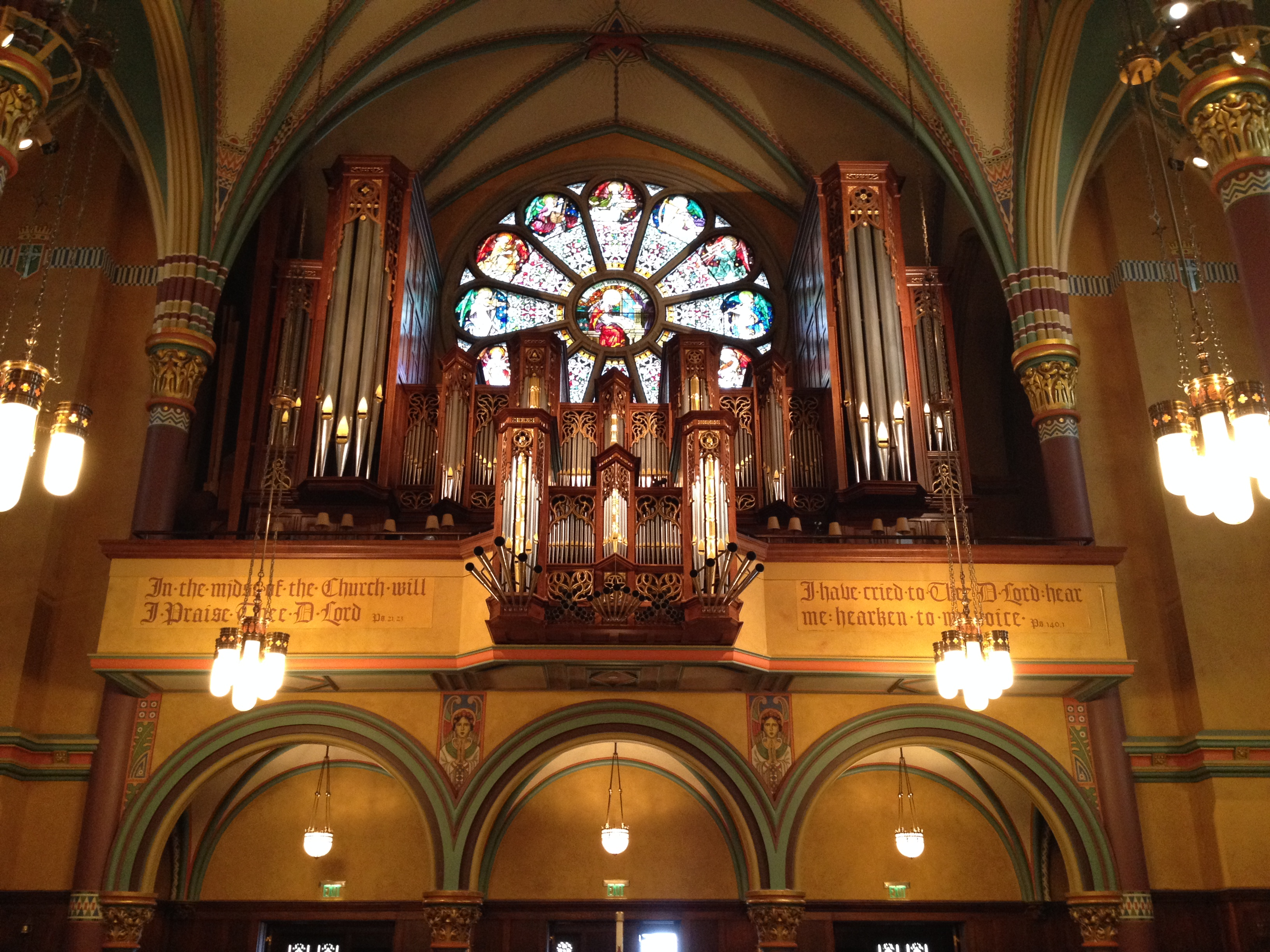
Pipe organ and loft (2014)

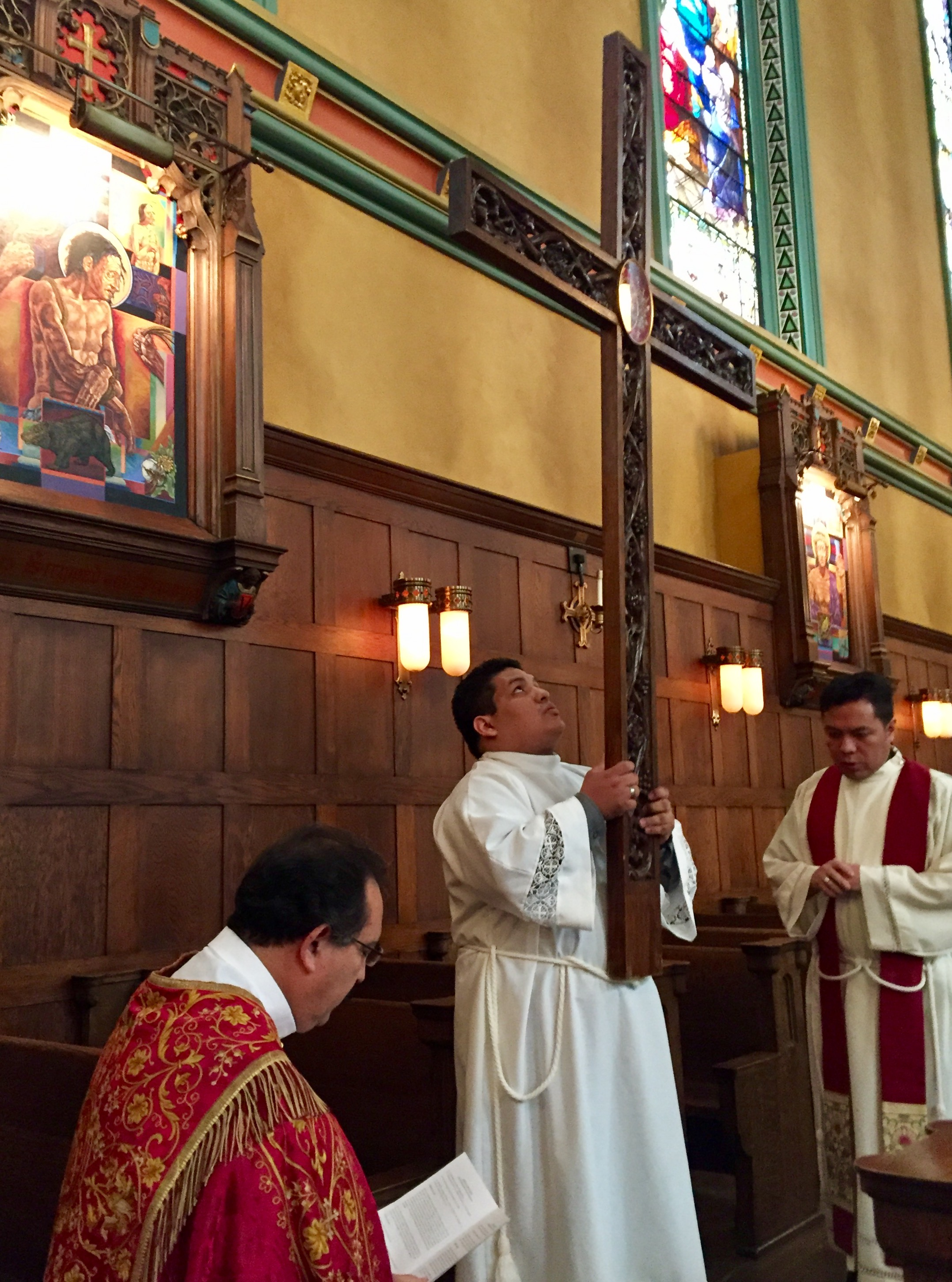
Stations of the Cross procession with relic of the True Cross (2017)

== Chancel mural ==
Chancel mural by Felix Liefuchter

== Pipe organ ==
The pipe organ was constructed in 1992 by Kenneth Jones & Associates in County Wicklow, Ireland. It contains 60 stops, 82 ranks, and 4,242 pipes. The reed stops are noted in red. The swell division is enclosed. Composer Amédée Tremblay served as the cathedral organist from 1920 to 1925.

=== Stop list ===
I - POSITIVE
Pitch	Stop
8'	Principal
8'	Hohlflute
8'	Quintadena
4'	Octave
4'	Coppelflute
2 2/3'	Nazard
2'	Octave
1 3/5'	Tierce
1'	Larigot
V-VI	Scharf 1 1/3
16'	Rankette
8'	Cromhorne
8'	Fanfare Trumpet
8'	Swell to Positive
Tremulant

II - GREAT
Pitch	Stop
16'	Principal
8'	Octave
8'	Rohrflute
8'	Gamba
4'	Octave
4'	Spitzflute
2 2/3'	Quint
2'	Octave
2'	Mixture IV
1/2'	Cymbal III
8'	Trumpet
8'	POSITIVE to GREAT
8'	SWELL to GREAT
8'	BOMBARDE to GREAT

III - SWELL
Pitch	Stop
16'	Bourdon
8'	Open Diapason
8'	Gedeckt
8'	Salicional
8'	Celeste
4'	Principal
4'	Harmonic Flute
2 2/3'	Nazard
2'	Gemshorn
1 3/5'	Tierce
2'	Mixture
16'	Double Trumpet
8'	Cornopean
8'	Oboe
4'	Clarion
Tremulant

IV - BOMBARDE
Pitch	Stop
8'	Open Flute
8'	Dulciana
	Cornet V
16'	Bombarde
8'	Trompette
8	Clarinet
4'	Clarion

PEDAL
Pitch	Stop
32'	Open Bass
16'	Principal
16'	Bourdon
8'	Octave
8'	Bass Flute
4'	Choral Bass
4'	Flute
2 2/3'	Mixture IV
32'	Contra Bombarde
16'	Trombone
8'	Bass Trumpet
4'	Schalmey
8'	GREAT to PEDAL
8'	POSITIVE to PEDAL
8'	SWELL to PEDAL

== See also ==
- List of Catholic cathedrals in the United States
- List of cathedrals in the United States
- National Register of Historic Places listings in Salt Lake City
