= Holy Cross Hospital - Salt Lake =

Hospital in Salt Lake City, Utah, US

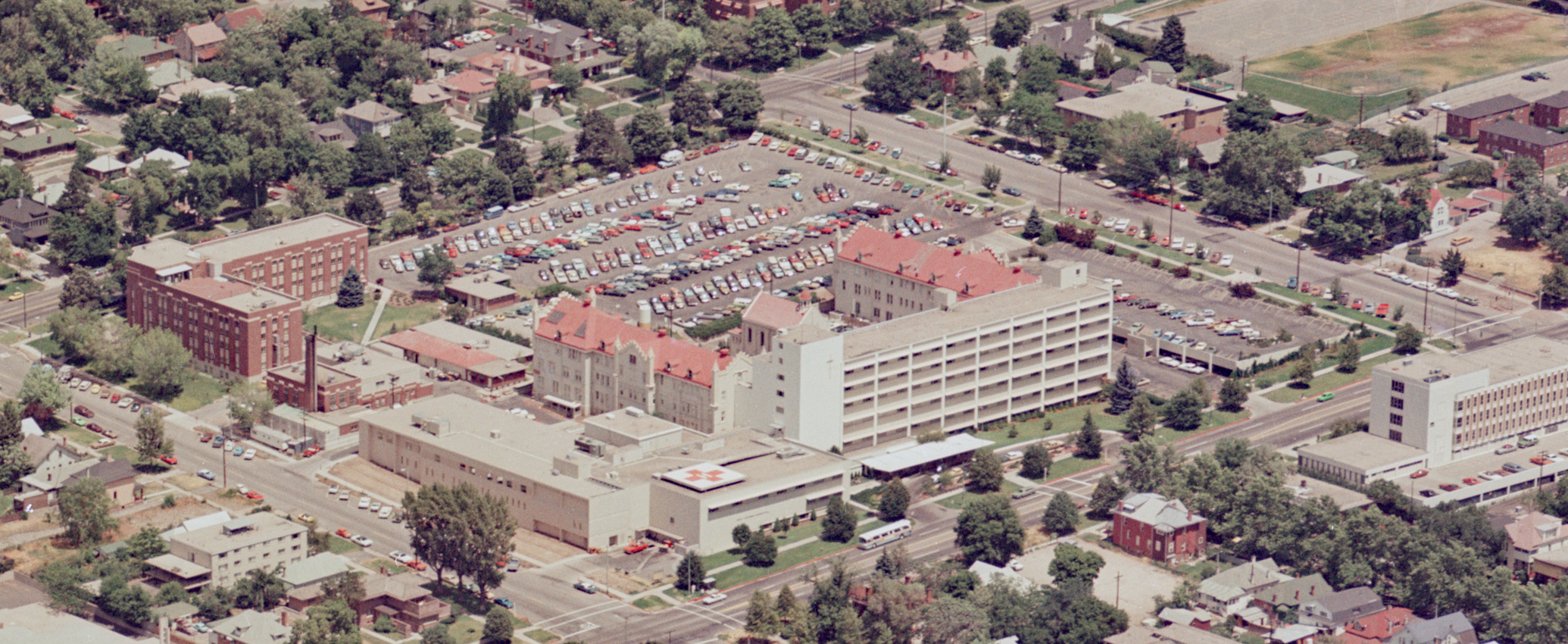
- The hospital in 1978

Geography
- Location: Salt Lake City, Utah, United States
- Coordinates: 40°46′06″N 111°51′40″W

Services
- Beds: 158

History
- Opened: October 25, 1875

Links
- Website: mountain.commonspirit.org
- Lists: Hospitals in Utah

Holy Cross Hospital - Salt Lake (formerly Salt Lake Regional Medical Center) is a 158-bed hospital located in Salt Lake City, Utah. Founded in 1875 as a Catholic hospital, it was operated by the Sisters of the Holy Cross until it was sold in 1994.

Since 2023, it has been operated by the Catholic health care system CommonSpirit Health.

== History ==
Holy Cross Hospital was opened on October 25, 1875, by the Sisters of the Holy Cross and Bartholomew. Located in a two-and-a-half story brick building at about 50 South 500 East, it had just twelve or thirteen beds and three doctors who worked without payments. Holy Cross was the second hospital established in Utah, following St. Mark's Hospital.

The hospital outgrew its original home by the early 1880s, and an entire city block at 1000 East and South Temple street was purchased to build a new structure. The new hospital building, costing $50,000 (equivalent to $1,727,679 in 2025) was ready for occupancy in June 1883. As the hospital continued to grow, a west wing was added in 1903 and a chapel constructed the following year. In 1916, an east wing was added to the hospital. During this period, St. Mary's Academy and College of Saint Mary-of-the-Wasatch both had cooperative programs with the hospital.

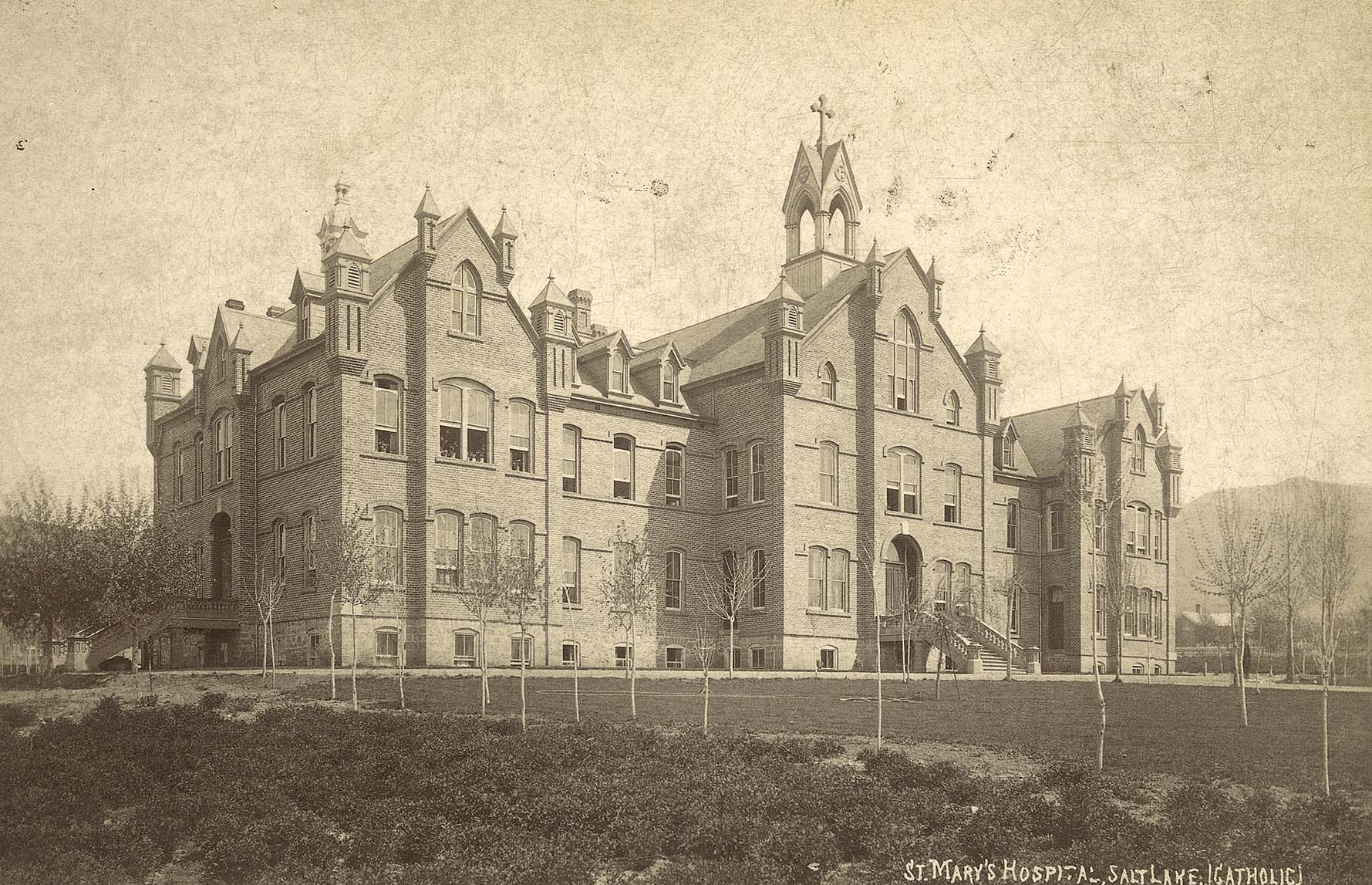
Holy Cross Hospital's 1883 building

In November 1960, the hospital dedicated a new structure, which replaced the 1883 building. As part of this project, the 1903 west and 1916 east wings, were remodeled and also served as wings to the new hospital building. The historic west wing was demolished and replaced with new facilities in 1988, and the historic east wing was demolished in 2005.

=== Ownership ===
One of the few Catholic hospitals in Utah for over a century, it was sold by the Sisters of the Holy Cross in 1994 to the for-profit institution, HealthTrust. The hospital's name was then briefly changed to Legacy Medical Center, before being changed to Salt Lake Regional Medical Center. Due to antitrust concerns raised by the Federal Trade Commission, the hospital was then sold to Champion Healthcare Corporation in 1995. However, the facility changed hands again in 1998 when Champion merged with Paracelsus Healthcare Corporation.

Subsequently, Iasis Healthcare managed the medical center between 2001 and September 2017. When it acquired Iasis, Steward Health Care began to maintain the hospital.

In May 2023, Salt Lake Regional Medical Center was acquired by CommonSpirit Health. The facility was one of several Utah hospitals purchased by the Catholic health care system maintained by Centura Health. Following the acquisition, the hospital was given its current name, Holy Cross Hospital - Salt Lake. This name pays homage to the Sisters of the Holy Cross and the institution's original name.

== Hospital chapel ==
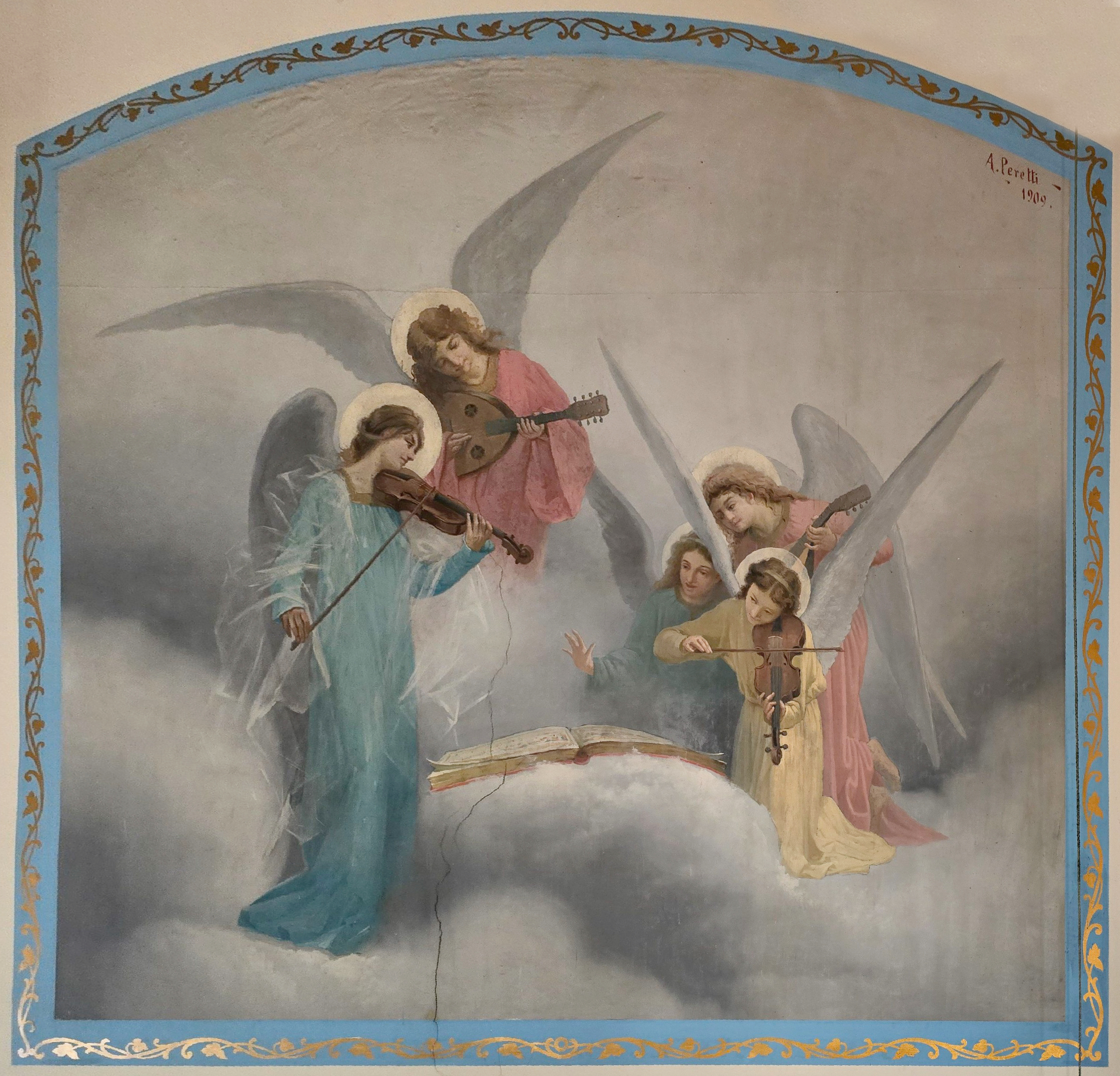
Peretti Mural at Holy Cross Chapel

A chapel, designed by Carl M. Neuhausen, was added to the hospital in 1904. In 1976, Holy Cross Chapel was added to the state historic registry and now serves as a nondenominational interfaith sanctuary. Italian artist Achille Peretti painted the murals in 1909.

== Bibliography ==
- Barker, Marilyn C.; Morris, R. P. (1975). The Early Holy Cross Hospital & Salt Lake Valley. Holy Cross Hospital Centennial Committee.
