= Daniel O'Sullivan (priest) =

Irish Roman Catholic priest

Father Daniel O'Sullivan
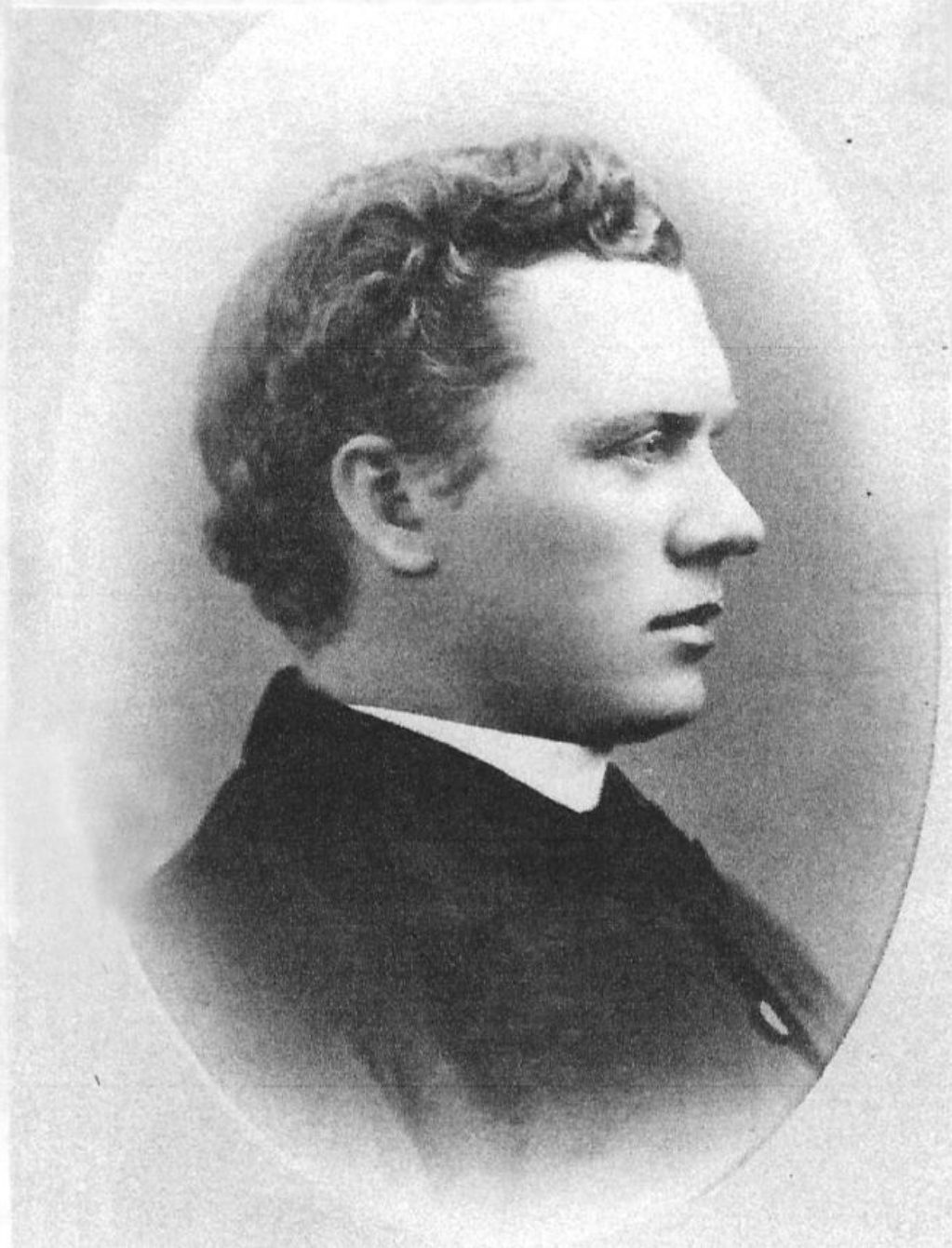
- Profile of O'Sullivan in the collection of St. Mary's in the Mountains
- Title: Vicar General (1883-1887)

Personal life
- Born: 19 March 1846 Listowel, County Kerry, Ireland
- Died: 3 February 1928 (aged 81) California
- Resting place: Holy Cross Cemetery
- Parents: Eugene Owen O’Sullivan (father); Margaret Nolan (mother)
- Education: All Hallows Major Seminary

Religious life
- Religion: Roman Catholic
- Founder of: Church of the Immaculate Conception, Smartsville Our Lady of Mount Carmel, Redwood City
- Ordination: 24 June 1871

Senior posting
- Based in: California
- Post: All Hallows Chapel, San Francisco
- Previous post: St. Mary's in the Mountains Catholic Church (1883-1887); St. Anthony's of Mendocino Church (1883-1887)

Daniel O'Sullivan (19 March 1846 – 3 February 1928) was an Irish Roman Catholic priest and theologian.

== Personal life and education ==
Daniel O'Sullivan was born on March 19, 1846, in Listowel, County Kerry, Ireland, the fourth child of Eugene Owen O’Sullivan and Margaret Nolan. He studied theology at the All Hallows Major Seminary in Dublin and was ordained on June 24, 1871, in All Hallows Chapel by Bishop William Whelan, O.C.D., who from 1848 to 1850 was Vicar Apostolic of Bombay.

Daniel O'Sullivan died on February 3, 1928, and was buried in the Holy Cross Cemetery in Colma, where a large monument stands in his memory.

== Priesthood ==
In August 1871, O'Sullivan moved to California. He was pastor of the Saint Joseph Church in Crescent City from 1871 to 1872 and founding pastor of the Church of the Immaculate Conception in Smartsville from 1872 to 1878. Dr Hugh Quigley wrote of O'Sullivan in 1878: "He is a gentleman of fine parts, and highly accomplished as a theologian, especially in that department of the sacred science which treats of Rubricks, or ceremonials. No small distinction for a young man."

In 1878, he moved to St. Mary's in the Mountains Catholic Church in Virginia City, where he was an assistant until 1881 when the first pastor of St. Mary's, Patrick Manogue, was appointed Bishop of Grass Valley and O'Sullivan was appointed the second pastor. From 1881 to 1883, he was pastor of the church and Vicar General for Northern Nevada. From 1883 to 1887, he was pastor of the St. Anthony's of Mendocino Church in Mendocino.

On May 7, 1886, he became a United States citizen by decree of Mendocino County Superior Court. On May 28, 1886, the Vatican merged the Diocese of Grass Valley into the newly erected Diocese of Sacramento and all the coastal parishes as far north as Fort Bragg into the Archdiocese of San Francisco. O'Sullivan thus became a priest of this archdiocese.

From 1887 to 1896, he was the founding pastor of Our Lady of Mount Carmel, Redwood City. He was appointed pastor of the Mission San José on June 15, 1896. From 1898 to 1928, he was pastor of the All Hallows Chapel in San Francisco.
