= SCCC =

SCCC or sccc may refer to:

- Sacramento Chinese Catholic Community, California, USA
- Scandinavia Chinese Christian Church, a collaboration of Chinese churches/congregations in Scandinavia.
- Scottish Consultative Council on the Curriculum, see Learning and Teaching Scotland
- Sentul City Convention Center, now the Sentul International Convention Center, West Java, Indonesia
- South Carolina Corps of Cadets, the student body at The Citadel in Charleston, SC, USA
- Southern Cross Catholic College, a catholic secondary school in Brisbane, Australia
- Sports Car Championship Canada, a Canadian professional sports car racing series, founded in 2021
- Spring Creek Correctional Center, a maximum security prison in Seward, Alaska
- Students for Concealed Carry on Campus, a collegiate pro-gun rights organization in the USA

== Cricket clubs ==
- Somerset County Cricket Club, England
- St Columba's Cricket Club, Rhode Island, USA
- Surrey County Cricket Club, England
- Sussex County Cricket Club, England

== Community colleges in the United States ==
- Seattle Central Community College, Seattle, Washington
- Schenectady County Community College, Schenectady, New York
- Seward County Community College, Liberal, Kansas
- St. Charles Community College, St. Charles, Missouri
- Suffolk County Community College, Suffolk County, New York
- Sullivan County Community College, Sullivan County, New York
- Sussex County Community College, Sussex County, New Jersey
