= St. Mary's in the Mountains Catholic Church =

Coordinates: 39.3091°N 119.6486°W

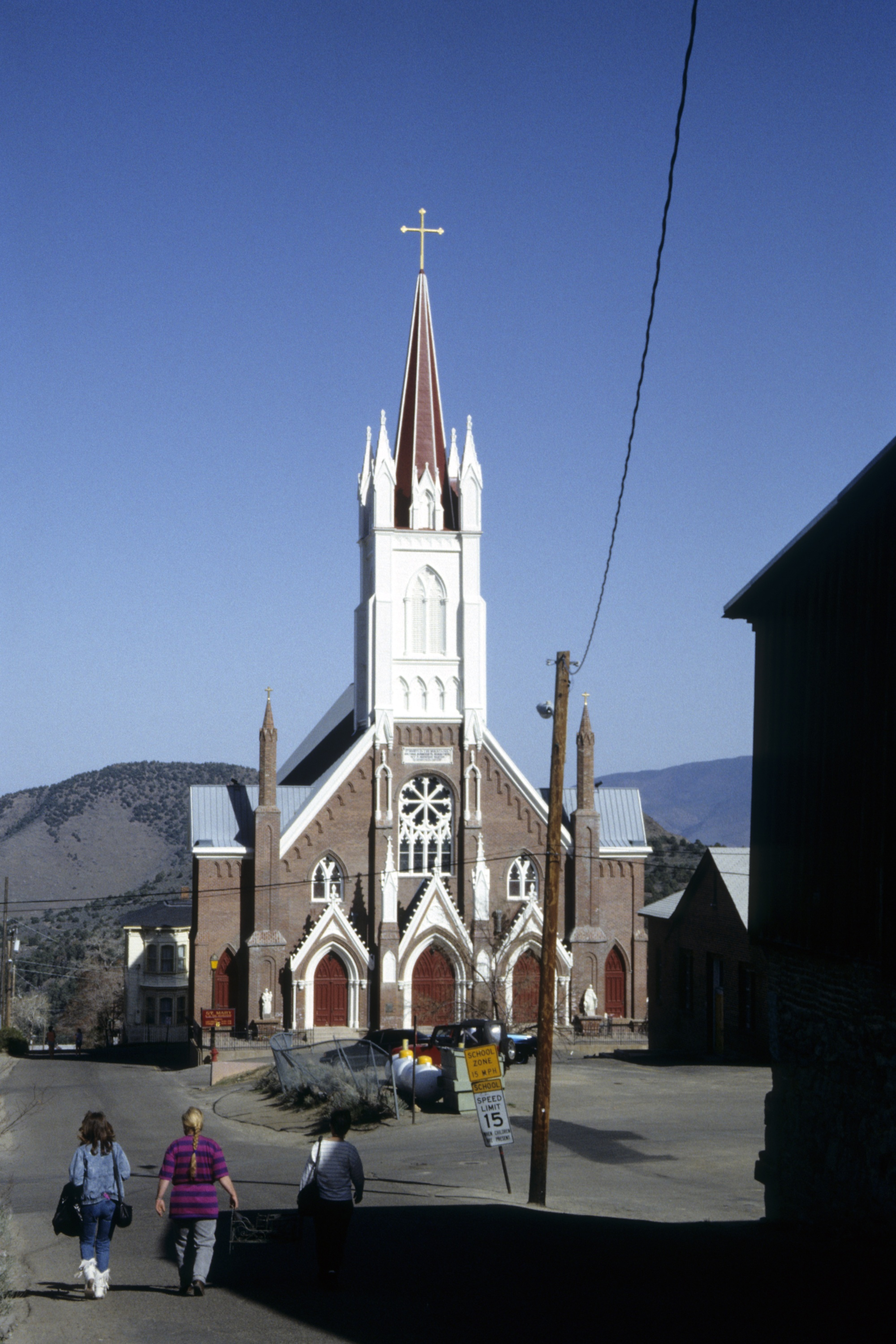
- St. Mary's in the Mountains Catholic Church
- Location: 111 South E Street; Virginia City, Nevada
- Country: United States
- Denomination: Roman Catholic Church

History
- Founded: 1868

Architecture
- Groundbreaking: 1868

Administration
- Diocese: Reno

St. Mary's in the Mountains Catholic Church is a parish of the Roman Catholic Church located in Virginia City, Nevada, under the Diocese of Reno. Its historic church includes a museum about its history and a gift shop.

== History ==
The first Catholic church in Virginia City, built by Fr. Hugh Gallagher in 1860, blew down within two years of construction. Gallagher's successor, Fr. Patrick Manogue, built its replacement shortly after his arrival on the Comstock. This structure was dedicated as St. Mary in the Mountains Church by Eugene O'Connell, Bishop of Grass Valley on July 17, 1864. Manogue would later become the first Bishop of Sacramento.

The area experienced a massive influx of Irish immigrants during this period to work the mines. This necessitated the construction of a larger brick structure across the street, which O'Connell dedicated on November 20, 1870. This church burned in the Great Fire of 1875, but was rebuilt the following year.

== Music ==
In 1982, the church acquired a third-hand, 1-manual and pedal, 6-rank, c. 1898 William Schuelke pipe organ, which was relocated through the Organ Clearing House and installed by the local organ firm, the Miller Organ Company. It was installed on the front left side of the nave. A matching case was built on the front right side of the nave for the chimes, which were playable from their own miniature keyboard. The Schuelke was originally built for Gjerpens Lutheran Church in Valders, Wisconsin, and had been relocated to a private residence in Green Bay before finding a home at St. Mary's.
