= Nccc =

Nccc (or NCCC) may refer to:

- National Civilian Community Corps, a program of AmeriCorps that uses youth aged 18-24 with military connections to complete national and community projects
- National COVID-19 Coordination Commission, renamed National COVID-19 Commission Advisory Board (NCC), Australian Government board
- Neosho County Community College
- New City Commercial Corporation Malls (NCCC Malls)
- New Creation Christian Community
- Niagara County Community College
- Nordic Chinese Christian Church
- North Carolina Community College System
- North Country Community College
- Northamptonshire County Cricket Club
- Northwestern Connecticut Community College
- Nottinghamshire County Cricket Club
- United States Nuclear command, control, and communications
