= Thomas Grace (bishop of Sacramento) =

Irish-born prelate

His Eminence, The Most Reverend Thomas Grace
- Bishop of Sacramento
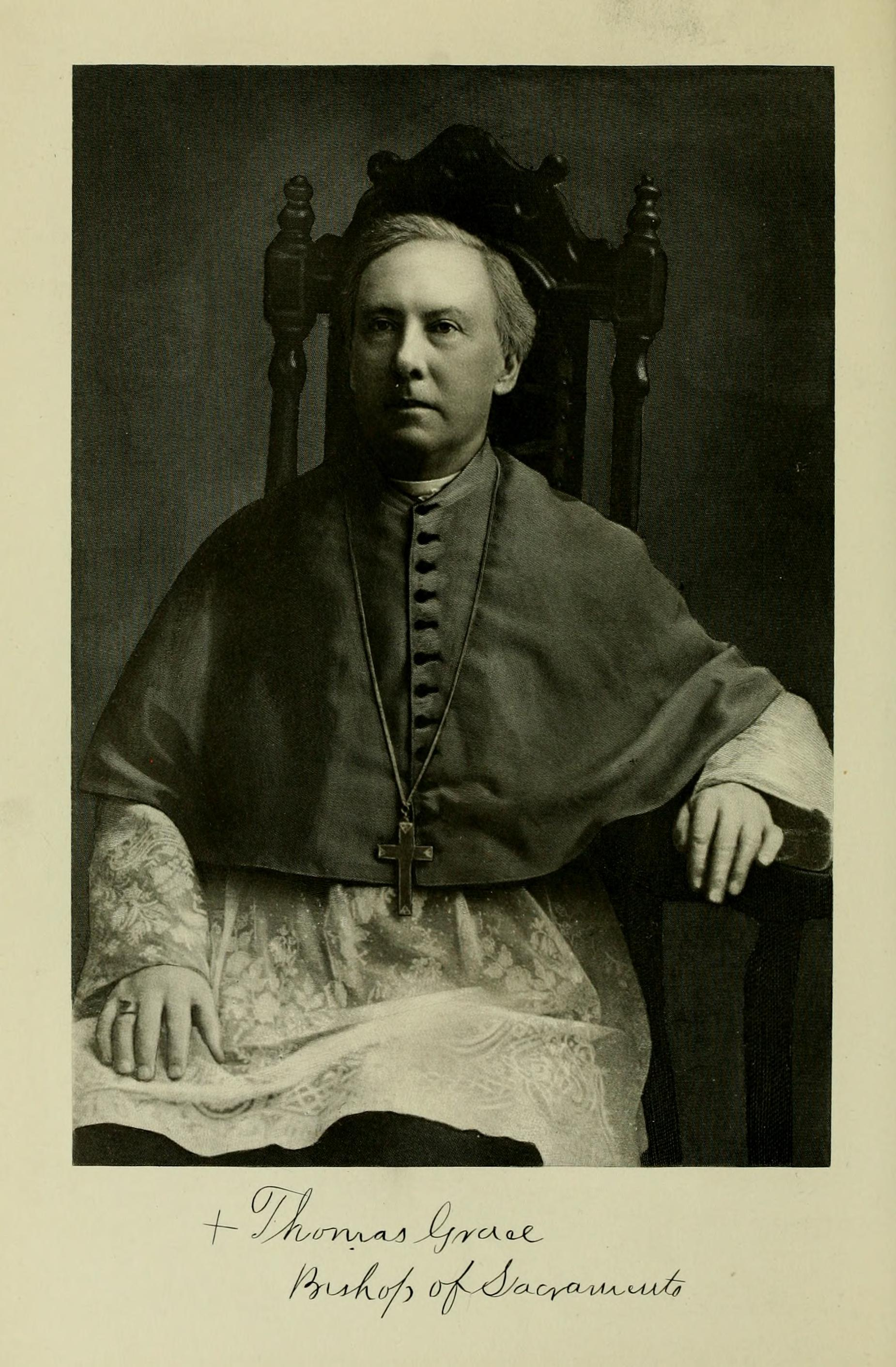
- Church: Roman Catholic Church
- See: Diocese of Sacramento
- Predecessor: Patrick Manogue
- Successor: Patrick Joseph James Keane

Orders
- Ordination: June 24, 1876 by David Moriarty
- Consecration: June 16, 1896 by Patrick William Riordan

Personal details
- Born: August 2, 1841 Wexford, Ireland>
- Died: December 27, 1921 (aged 80) Sacramento, California, US
- Education: St Peter's College, Wexford; All Hallows Missionary College

Styles of Thomas Grace
- Reference style: The Most Reverend
- Spoken style: Your Excellency
- Religious style: Monsignor

Thomas Grace (August 2, 1841 – December 27, 1921) was an Irish-born prelate of the Roman Catholic Church. He served as the second bishop of the Diocese of Sacramento in California from 1896 to his death in 1921.

== Biography ==
=== Early life ===
Thomas Grace was born on August 2, 1841, in Wexford, Ireland. He was educated at St Peter's College, Wexford and All Hallows Missionary College, Dublin.

=== Priesthood ===
Grace was ordained a priest for the Archdiocese of Dublin by Bishop David Moriarty in Dublin on June 24, 1876. After his ordination, Grace travelled to California. He served as pastor of several churches in Eureka, California, Carson City, Nevada, and Marysville, California. Grace dedicated St. Mary of the Lake Church in Nevada on the Feast of the Assumption, 1881. Eventually, Grace became the pastor of the pro-cathedral, Saint Rose of Lima Church, whose land was donated by the first governor of California, Peter Burnett.

=== Bishop of Sacramento ===
On February 27, 1896, Pope Leo XIII appointed Grace as bishop of Sacramento. He was consecrated on June 16, 1896, at the Cathedral of the Blessed Sacrament in Sacramento by Archbishop Patrick Riordan.

Grace dedicated St. Patrick Church in Scotia, California, on March 28, 1905, and St. Joseph Church in Redding, California, in April 1905. On October 30, 1906, he was given the property deed in Red Bluff, California, with the provision that it remain as a hospital for the Sisters of Mercy. In June 1919, Grace dedicated St. Gall Church in Gardnerville, Nevada.

Grace helped launch the diocesan newspaper, The Catholic Herald, with a message endorsing its scope and usefulness to the diocese on March 14, 1908.

=== Death and legacy ===
Patrick Grace died in Sacramento on December 27, 1921. Grace Day Home in Sacramento was named for him.

Catholic Church titles
Preceded by Patrick Manogue	Bishop of Sacramento; 1896–1921	Succeeded by Patrick Joseph James Keane
