= KRJY =

KRJY may refer to:

- KRJY-LP, a low-power radio station (101.5 FM) licensed to serve Yuma, Arizona, United States
- KLCF, a radio station (91.1 FM) licensed to serve Truth or Consequence, New Mexico, United States, which held the call sign KRJY from 2011 to 2013
- KCVV, a radio station (1240 AM) licensed to serve Sacramento, California, United States, which held the call sign KRJY from 2008 to 2011
- WFUN-FM, a radio station (96.3 FM) licensed to serve St. Louis, Missouri, United States, which held the call sign KRJY from 1987 to 1994
