= Alden John Bell =

Roman Catholic bishop (1904 – 1982)

The Most Reverend Alden J. Bell, DD
- Bishop of Sacramento
- Church: Catholic Church
- See: Sacramento
- In office: March 30, 1962 – July 11, 1979
- Predecessor: Joseph Thomas McGucken
- Successor: Francis Anthony Quinn
- Previous post: Auxiliary Bishop of Los Angeles (1956–1962)

Orders
- Ordination: May 14, 1932
- Consecration: June 4, 1956 by James Francis McIntyre

Personal details
- Born: July 11, 1904 Peterborough, Ontario, Canada
- Died: August 28, 1982 (aged 78) Sacramento, California, U.S.

Ordination history of Alden John Bell
History
Episcopal consecration
- Consecrated by: James Francis McIntyre
- Date: June 4, 1956
Episcopal succession
Bishops consecrated by Alden John Bell as principal consecrator
- John Stephen Cummins: May 16, 1974

Alden John Bell (July 11, 1904 – August 28, 1982) was a 20th-century bishop of the Catholic Church in the United States. He served as bishop of the Diocese of Sacramento in California from 1962 to 1979.

== Biography ==
=== Early life ===
Alden John Bell was born in Peterborough, Ontario, Canada. He completed his undergraduate education at Saint Patrick's Seminary in Menlo Park, California, and his graduate studies at Catholic University of America in Washington, D.C.

While at the seminary in 1927, Bell was one of three pastoral interns who were assigned to St. Elizabeth Catholic Church in Altadena, California.

=== Priesthood ===
He was ordained a Roman Catholic priest for the Diocese of Los Angeles-San Diego on May 14, 1932. In 1935, Bell persuaded the Sisters of the Holy Child Jesus to teach at the Sacred Heart Mission.

=== Auxiliary Bishop of Los Angeles ===
On April 11, 1956, Bell was appointed Auxiliary Bishop of Los Angeles and Titular Bishop of Rhodopolis by Pope Pius XII. He received his episcopal consecration on the following June 4 in St. Vibiana's Cathedral from Cardinal James Francis McIntyre, with Bishops Joseph Thomas McGucken and Timothy Manning serving as co-consecrators.

On November 10, 1956, Bell blessed La Salle High School two months after it opened. On March 9, 1957, Bell consecrated the high altar at St. Kevin's Church, Los Angeles. On October 26, 1957, Bell presided over the gymnasium dedication at Junípero Serra High School in Gardena, California.

=== Bishop of Sacramento ===
On March 30, 1962, Bell was appointed the sixth Bishop of Sacramento by Pope John XXIII. He was installed on May 15, 1962, in the Cathedral of the Blessed Sacrament, Sacramento.

During the 1960s, Bell learned that a brass locomotive bell, donated by a retired Southern Pacific Railroad parishioner, was going to be installed in All Hallows Church in Sacramento. The church had been built without a bell in 1960 with a large campanile. Bell instructed Pastor Cornelius O'Connor not to place the bell in the tower, but to buy a proper church bell instead. O'Connor declined to buy a new bell, and declared that his parish would have no bells.

On September 17, 1963, Bell dedicated Jesuit High School, Sacramento, to the Jesuit North American Martyrs. In May 1982, he returned to this school to dedicate its library in memory of the Rev. Joseph J. King, S.J. On April 2, 1965, Bell dedicated the fourth rebuilding of St. Joseph Church in Redding, California. The original church had been constructed near railroad tracks and later moved to the site of the second church. Both the second and third St. Joseph's churches had burnt down in fires.

On June 7, 1965, Bell dedicated Holy Family Parish's new church, which replaced the Camp Kohler chapel that had been purchased from the Army. In 1969, as the ordinary, Bell approved within the see of Sacramento Our Lady of Guadalupe Church as a "national shrine". This shrine is known as the Sanctuary of the National Shrine of Our Lady of Guadalupe or as Santuario Nacional de Nuestra Señora de Guadalupe. This was accomplished after the construction of its new church, because at that time it had become the largest "Spanish speaking" Mexican parish. In 1973, Bell dedicated St. Joseph Parish's new church in Elk Grove, California. The old church had been sold in December 1972.

On May 6, 1974, Bell was the principal consecrator of Bishop John Stephen Cummins. Cummins had been appointed as the diocesan auxiliary bishop on February 26, 1974. In 1977, Bell supervised the purchase and installation of a Schlicker organ from Buffalo, New York, for the Cathedral of the Blessed Sacrament. While it had nine ranks of pipes, the organ proved to be inadequate for the music of the cathedral's liturgy. In May 1977, Bell gave $20,000, which had been a World War II relief fund for Slovaks, to the Byzantine Eparch of Parma, Emil Mihalik. The eparch said the money would be used to build a church in Sacramento.

==== Ecumenical Councils ====
From 1962 to 1965, Bell attended all four sessions of the Second Vatican Council. He was responsible for implementing the reforms that resulted from the Council in the diocese. Many parishes began parish councils at this time, and he encouraged the emergence of lay ministry in the diocese. At the same time, he needed to respond to the needs of a growing diocese. Solano County was added to the diocese. He focused on the development of high schools throughout the diocese. He initiated a fund drive to ease costs, build new schools, expand religious education programs, and build a home for the aged.

The 17 years he spent as bishop of the diocese, which grew to nearly 250,000 members during his tenure, was a period of turbulence. Issues from outside the diocese also affected day-to-day life: the Vietnam War, the civil rights movement, and legislative matters on abortion. Within the diocese, his positive actions to aid Catholic education, improve interaction with the Latino community, and renovate the interior of the cathedral were undermined by divisions, school closures, and world tensions.

=== Retirement and legacy ===
Pope John Paul II accepted Bell's resignation on July 11, 1979, at the age of 75. In October 1979, a knife-wielding assailant, William Luthin, attacked and cut Bell several times while he was off-duty in the cathedral's chancery. He was stabbed twice before his secretary, Jean Tamaki, was able to pull Luthin away by his shirt, Bell had been in his office preparing for a trip to see Pope John Paul II in Chicago, Illinois.

Luthin surrendered to police at a hospital after telling nurses, "Call somebody. I stabbed a priest." A knife was found on the office couch together with the sales receipt from a nearby store. Bell was held overnight at Mercy General Hospital with hand and rib wounds. Luthin had seen the bishop earlier that day and reportedly complained about being excommunicated. The bishop's trip to meet the pope was canceled. Luthin was found not guilty by reason of insanity.

Alden Bell died of esophageal cancer on August 28, 1982, aged 78.

== Quotes ==
Then Governor Ronald Reagan's 1970 letter to Bell answering his request on "the tragic situation of Catholic school finances in California."

The educational services to the 10 percent of the elementary and secondary school population of our state enjoying the benefits of such schools have done so much to enrich California heritage over the years. I feel it absolutely essential that we start placing the resources of the state behind the student, not the educational establishment.

From a May 1976 letter written by Bell that was read at all diocesan Masses concerning the deaths of 27 high school choir members and their chaperone.

Here we stand on the edge of a chasm of sorrow and tragedy. Some have been left behind and others hopefully await the outcome in a struggle for life. Our faith gives us a bridge to lead us safely through grief to a better understanding of God's way for us.

Bishop Francis Quinn on the subject of Bell's 1982 death.

(Bishop Alden Bell) is one of those exceptional bishops called upon to lead the Church during the most demanding years following the Vatican II Council. He met the challenge with wisdom, patience and compassion.

Catholic Church titles
Preceded by Joseph Thomas McGucken	Bishop of Sacramento; 1962–1979	Succeeded by Francis Quinn
