= Alphonse Gallegos =

American Catholic prelate

Venerable Alphonse Gallegos OAR
- Auxiliary Bishop of Sacramento
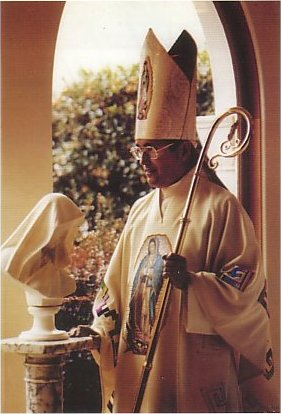
- Gallegos in his episcopal vestments honoring Nuestra Señora de Guadalupe.
- Church: Roman Catholic Church
- Diocese: Sacramento
- See: Sacramento
- Appointed: 24 August 1981
- Term ended: 6 October 1991
- Other post: Titular Bishop of Sasabe (1981-1991)

Orders
- Ordination: 24 May 1958
- Consecration: 4 November 1981 by Francis Anthony Quinn
- Rank: Bishop

Personal details
- Born: Alphonse Gallegos; 20 February 1931 Albuquerque, New Mexico, United States
- Died: 6 October 1991 (aged 60) Sacramento, California, United States
- Buried: National Shrine of Our Lady of Guadalupe, Sacramento
- Denomination: Roman Catholic
- Motto: "Love One Another"
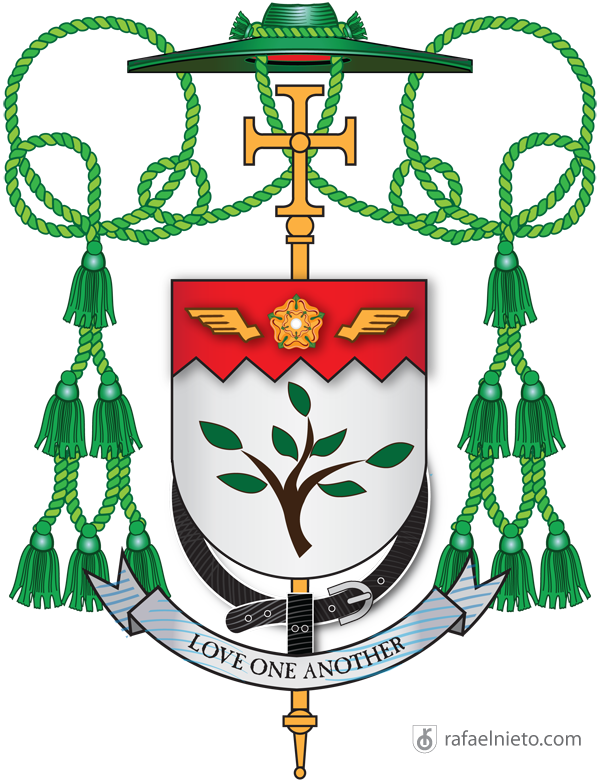
- Coat of arms: Alphonse Gallegos's coat of arms

Styles of Alphonse Gallegos
- Reference style: The Most Reverend
- Spoken style: Your Excellency
- Religious style: Monsignor

Alphonse Gallegos, OAR (February 20, 1931 – October 6, 1991), was an American Catholic prelate who served as Auxiliary Bishop of Sacramento from 1981 until his death in 1991. He was nicknamed the "Bishop of the Barrios". His beatification process was opened in 2006 and on 8 July 2016, Pope Francis named him venerable in recognition of his heroic virtue.

== Early life ==
Gallegos was born in Albuquerque, New Mexico, where his father was a carpenter, and his mother a homemaker caring for their 11 children. He had a twin brother, Eloy, grew up in Watts, attended Manual Arts High School and received confirmation from then auxiliary bishop Timothy Manning. The family attended San Miguel parish, which was run by the Order of Augustinian Recollects.

Gallegos attended Rockhurst University in Kansas City, graduated from St. Thomas Aquinas College in Sparkill, New York, St. John's University in New York and Loyola Marymount University in Los Angeles. He entered the Order of Augustinian Recollects as a novice in 1950.

While a seminarian at the Tagaste Monastery in Suffern, New York, his superiors learned that Gallegos was born with a severe myopic condition. Although he had eye surgery prior to entering the seminary, his vision remained poor. Gallegos was ordained a Roman Catholic priest for the Augustinian Recollects on May 24, 1958.

He spent eight years at Tagaste serving as chaplain at neighboring hospitals and religious communities and served in various capacities in his order's houses of formation. In 1972 he became pastor of San Miguel in Watts, and in 1978 of Cristo Rey in Glendale in the Archdiocese of Los Angeles. He was an advisor to Los Angeles Cardinal Timothy Manning on Hispanic affairs and helped set up a training program for the archdiocese's Hispanic permanent diaconate.

He was transferred to the Diocese of Sacramento where Gallegos served from 1979 to 1981 as the first director of the Division of Hispanic Affairs of the California Catholic Conference.

== Auxiliary bishop ==
On August 24, 1981, Pope John Paul II appointed Gallegos auxiliary bishop of the Roman Catholic Diocese of Sacramento, in Sacramento, California as the titular bishop of Sasabe. He was consecrated bishop on November 4, 1981, by Bishop Francis Quinn. In 1983, Bishop Quinn appointed Gallegos pastor of the National Shrine of Our Lady of Guadalupe.

In his ministry, both as a priest and later as bishop, Gallegos dressed in a 99-cent sombrero and T-shirt to minister at night to gang members, lowriders, and at-risk youth in impoverished areas of Los Angeles and Sacramento.

== Death ==
On October 6, 1991, Gallegos died when he was struck by a driver while returning to Sacramento from Gridley, California. Gallegos and his driver had stopped to help a stranded motorist. Other accounts say that their car suddenly lost power and stopped in the left lane. As the men began to push the car off the road and onto the median, another car slammed into their vehicle, throwing the bishop some 50 feet to the right shoulder. Gallegos died instantly. He was considered an unofficial chaplain to lowriders and migrant workers. In honor of the “Bishop of the Barrio,” about 300 lowrider cars formed part of his funeral procession from the parish of St. Rose where he lived to the city's Cathedral of the Blessed Sacrament.

== Beatification process ==
In 2005, after eleven months of scrutiny, the cause for Gallegos's beatification was opened by Bishop William Weigand. He was declared a Servant of God on June 5, 2006.

On March 24, 2010, Gallegos's body was exhumed and transferred to the Cathedral of the Blessed Sacrament as part of his cause towards sainthood. On March 25, 2010, his remains were transferred to the parish he resided in as an auxiliary bishop. This parish is the Sanctuary of the National Shrine of Our Lady of Guadalupe also known as Santuario Nacional de Nuestra Señora de Guadalupe in Sacramento.

On July 8, 2016, Pope Francis authorized the Congregation for the Causes of Saints to promulgate a decree recognizing the heroic virtues of Servant of God Alphonse Gallegos and naming him venerable.

== Legacy ==
I would like to be remembered as having helped the young people how to appreciate who they are and to value the life God has given them. I would also like to be remembered as having appreciated people and all that they have to offer in making the world a better place to live in.

Because he was a member of the Knights of Columbus and supporter of the unborn, Bishop Gallegos Assembly 2336 and Bishop Gallegos Maternity Home are named for him.

The city of Sacramento named a section of Eleventh St. between K and L Streets the Gallegos Square in his memory. In 1997, a statue of Bishop Gallegos was unveiled in Gallegos Square next to the cathedral.

Ordination history of Alphonse Gallegos
History
Priestly ordination
- Date: 24 May 1958
Episcopal consecration
- Principal consecrator: Francis Anthony Quinn
- Co-consecrators: John Raphael Quinn; Robert Fortune Sanchez
- Date: 4 November 1981
