= Robert John Armstrong =

American prelate

His Excellency, The Most Reverend Robert J. Armstrong D.D.
- Bishop of Sacramento
- Bishop Armstrong
- Church: Catholic Church
- See: Diocese of Sacramento
- In office: January 4, 1929 – January 14, 1957
- Predecessor: Patrick Joseph James Keane
- Successor: Joseph Thomas McGucken

Orders
- Ordination: December 10, 1910 by Louis Joseph Napoléon Paul Bruchési
- Consecration: March 12, 1929 by Edward O'Dea

Personal details
- Born: November 17, 1884 San Francisco, California, US
- Died: January 14, 1957 (aged 72) Sacramento, California, US
- Education: Gonzaga University; Grand Seminary of Montreal
- Motto: Omnia propter electos (All because of the elect)

Robert John Armstrong (November 17, 1884 – January 14, 1957) was an American prelate of the Roman Catholic Church. He served as the fourth bishop of the Diocese of Sacramento in California from 1929 until his death in 1957.

== Biography ==
=== Early life ===
Robert Armstrong was born on November 17, 1884, in San Francisco, California. His family later moved to Washington State. He studied at Gonzaga University in Seattle, graduating in 1904. He then attended the Grand Seminary of Montreal in Montréal, Quebec.

=== Priesthood ===
Armstrong was ordained a priest in Montréal by Bishop Paul Bruchési for the Diocese of Seattle on December 10, 1910. He served as a curate in Spokane and was pastor of St. Paul's Parish in Yakima, Washington from 1914 to 1929.

Armstrong would later be transferred to the Diocese of Spokane where he eventually became the assistant pastor at Our Lady of Lourdes Cathedral Parish . He was "inducted into the order" of the Knights of Columbus and became a chaplain of the order. Armstrong spent 15 years in Yakima and was known as "Father Bob".

=== Bishop of Sacramento ===
On January 4, 1929, Pope Pius XI named Armstrong as the fourth bishop of Sacramento. He was consecrated a bishop at Saint James Cathedral in Seattle on March 12, 1929, by Bishop Edward O'Dea. The co-consecrators were Bishops Mathias Lenihan and Joseph McGrath.

During the week of August 2, 1930, Captain Michael Riordan and Armstrong hosted a lay retreat for men from the Ancient Order of Hibernians and the Sacramento Valley region at a Jesuit retreat center near Los Altos, California. In August 1932, Armstrong gave a short address to the Veterans of Foreign Wars convention at the Memorial Auditorium in Sacramento.

In January 1935, Armstrong gave the benediction at the inauguration of California Governor Frank Merriam. In December 1936, Armstrong travelled to Sacred Heart Parish in Gridley, California to establish a men's Holy Name Society. The bishop preached that its purpose was for "each man to labor for the glory of God's name."

In April 1940, Armstrong was the concluding speaker at a three-day Catholic Confraternity of Christian Doctrine convention in Portland, Oregon. He postulated that religion "cannot enter our public schools and pupils think it of little importance when it cannot be taught as other subjects."

Armstrong led his ecclesial community through the Great Depression and World War II while becoming known for his casual and approachable manner. He became involved in government and legislative issues that affected Catholics. He institutionalized social work within the see and upgraded its Catholic school system. By 1957 there were 209,281 Catholics in the diocese, a 255% increase from 1940. Armstrong established over 28 new parishes. At his death, the diocese encompassed 36 Northern California counties.

In April 1942, Armstrong returned to Spokane to celebrate a pontifical requiem mass for his mother, Margaret Armstrong, who died at age 80. She was a member of the St. Aloysius altar society.

=== Death and legacy ===
Armstrong's health declined in 1954. On October 26, 1955, Pope Pius XII named Bishop Joseph McGucken as coadjutor bishop with the right of succession. Robert Armstrong died in Sacramento in January 1957.

== See also ==
- Historical list of the Catholic bishops of the United States
- List of the Catholic bishops of the United States

== Sources ==
- Roman Catholic Diocese of Sacramento Retrieved 2010-05-20.
- "Diocese of Sacramento". Catholic-Hierarchy.org. David M. Cheney.
- The Hierarchy of the Catholic Church Retrieved 2010-05-20.

== Episcopal succession ==
Catholic Church titles
Preceded by Patrick Joseph James Keane	Bishop of Sacramento; 1929–1957	Succeeded by Joseph Thomas McGucken
