= Patrick Joseph James Keane =

Irish-born prelate

His Excellency, The Most Reverend Patrick Keane
- Bishop of Sacramento titular bishop of Sebaste in Palaestina
- Church: Catholic Church
- See: Diocese of Sacramento
- In office: March 17, 1922 – September 1, 1928
- Predecessor: Thomas Grace
- Successor: Robert John Armstrong

Orders
- Ordination: June 20, 1895 by John Joseph Keane
- Consecration: December 14, 1920 by Edward Joseph Hanna

Personal details
- Born: January 6, 1872 Ballybunnion, County Kerry, Ireland
- Died: September 1, 1928 (aged 56) Sacramento, California, US
- Education: St. Patrick's College; Catholic University of America
- Motto: Deus adjuvabit (God will help)

Patrick Joseph James Keane (January 6, 1872 – September 1, 1928) was an Irish-born prelate of the Roman Catholic Church. He served as bishop of the Diocese of Sacramento in California from 1922 until his death in 1928. Keane previously served as an auxiliary bishop of the same diocese from 1920 to 1922.

== Biography ==
=== Early life ===
Patrick Keane was born on January 6, 1872, in Ballybunnion, County Kerry, Ireland to Jeremiah and Mary (Kissane) Keane. In 1890, he entered St Michael's College, Listowel, a secondary school. Deciding to become a priest, he began his seminary studies St. Patrick's College in Carlow, both in Ireland. Keane later decided to join his uncle, Bishop John Joseph Keane, in the United States, continuing his studies at the Catholic University of America in Washington, D.C.

=== Priesthood ===
Patrick Keane was ordained a priest for the Archdiocese of San Francisco on June 20, 1895 in Washington by Bishop John Joseph Keane. Patrick received a Doctor of Divinity degree from Catholic University in 1896.

After his ordination, the archdiocese assigned Patrick Keane as a curate at St. Patrick's Parish in San Francisco. In 1910, Archbishop Patrick W. Riordan of San Francisco named Keane, Administrator of St. Francis de Sales Cathedral Parish in Oakland. On July 30, 1915, Archbishop Edward Hanna appointed Keane, second pastor of St. Francis de Sales.

=== Auxiliary Bishop and Bishop of Sacramento ===
On September 10, 1920, Pope Benedict XV named Keane as titular bishop of Sebaste in Palaestina and auxiliary bishop of Sacramento. He was consecrated a bishop at the Cathedral of Saint Mary of the Assumption in San Francisco on December 14, 1920, by Hanna. The co-consecrators were Bishops John Cantwell and Thomas Grace.

On December 27, 1921, Bishop Grace died. On March 17, 1922, Pope Pius XI named Keane as the third bishop of Sacramento. During his tenure as bishop, Keane was instrumental in the formation of the parochial school system. He also founded several new parishes and followed a directive from the Holy See to recruit new priests and vocations from the local diocese.

=== Death and legacy ===
Patrick Keane died in Sacramento on September 1, 1928, at age 56.
