= Sacramento Chinese Catholic Community =

The Sacramento Chinese Catholic Community (SCCC) (沙加緬度華人天主教團體) is the only group of Chinese Catholics (Roman Rite) in the Diocese of Sacramento, California. The community members embrace both the Catholic faith and Chinese traditions.

The community is part of the Cathedral of the Blessed Sacrament parish in the Diocese of Sacramento . The community celebrates the Eucharist at the Cathedral of the Blessed Sacrament, the seat of the Diocese of Sacramento, with the permission of Bishop Weigand. The Eucharist is celebrated every Sunday at 2 PM, trilingually in Mandarin, Cantonese, and English. The community's current pastor is Father Abraham Chiu (趙必成神父), who is originally from Hong Kong.

== Logo ==
The logo of the community was "written" in Chinese calligraphy to show the Chinese traditions of the congregation. The symbol in the middle resembles the Chinese character 中, which means middle and whose Mandarin pinyin is "zhong." This also reminds the community members of their Chinese identity because China was called the Middle Kingdom. Taking another prospective, one may find the shape of a dove embedded in the symbol. This reminds the group that the Holy Spirit is always watching over them. One may also find that the symbol also resembles the symbol with a "P" and a cross, representing Christ. This reminds the group to have faith in Jesus Christ. The logo has four liturgical colors used throughout Gregorian Calendar of the Latin Church, representing our Catholic traditions that we adhere to. These colors include white (used in celebrations of important feast days), red (used on feast days for martyrs—the red color represents the blood they shed for their faith in Christ—and on Pentecost—the red also represents the color of fire in which Holy Spirit appeared (Acts 2:3)), purple (used in Advent and Lent) and Green (used in Ordinary Time), which represent the everlasting life that Christ assures us.
