= Francis Quinn =

American Roman Catholic prelate (1921–2019)

His Excellency, The Most Reverend Francis Anthony Quinn
- Bishop of Sacramento
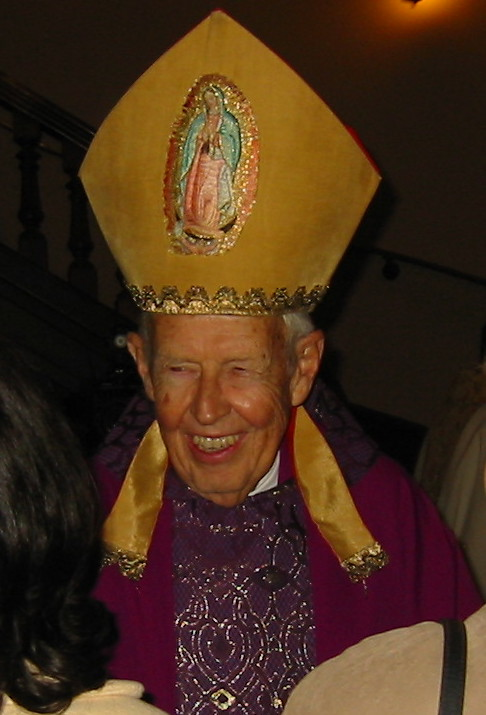
- Quinn in November 2004
- Archdiocese: San Francisco
- Diocese: Sacramento
- Appointed: December 18, 1979
- Installed: February 18, 1980
- Term ended: November 30, 1993
- Predecessor: Alden John Bell
- Successor: William Weigand
- Previous post: Auxiliary Bishop of San Francisco (1978 to 1979)

Orders
- Ordination: June 15, 1946 by John Joseph Mitty
- Consecration: June 29, 1978 by John R. Quinn, Joseph Thomas McGucken, and William Joseph McDonald

Personal details
- Born: September 11, 1921 Los Angeles, California, U.S.
- Died: March 21, 2019 (aged 97) Sacramento, California, U.S.
- Education: St. Joseph’s Seminary; St. Patrick's Seminary; Catholic University of America; University of California, Berkeley
- Motto: Lumen gentum Christus (Christ is the light of the nation)

Styles of Francis Anthony Quinn
- Reference style: His Excellency; The Most Reverend
- Spoken style: Your Excellency
- Religious style: Bishop

Francis Anthony Quinn (September 11, 1921 – March 21, 2019) was an American Roman Catholic prelate who served as the bishop of the Diocese of Sacramento in California from 1980 to 1993. He previously served as an auxiliary bishop of the Archdiocese of San Francisco from 1978 to 1979.

After his retirement, Quinn ministered for several years to Native American communities in the Southwestern United States.

== Early life ==
Francis Quinn was born on September 11, 1921, in Los Angeles, California, to Frank Quinn and Anne Chierici. At age 14, he entered St. Joseph's Seminary in Mountain View, California. He then entered St. Patrick's Seminary in Menlo Park, California. He was awarded a bachelor's degree spent four post-graduate years of theology studies.

== Priesthood ==
Quinn was ordained a priest for the Archdiocese of San Francisco on June 15, 1946, by Archbishop John Joseph Mitty in San Francisco. A few months after his ordination, the archdiocese sent Quinn to Washington, D.C. to attend the Catholic University of America. He earned an Master of Arts degree in education in 1947.

After returning to San Francisco, the archdiocese assigned him to the faculty of Serra High School, in San Mateo, California. He was transferred in 1950 to Sacred Heart Cathedral Preparatory in San Francisco. Quinn was named as an assistant superintendent of schools for the archdioceses in 1955. He received a Doctor of Education degree from the University of California, Berkeley, in 1962. He was appointed editor for the San Francisco Monitor in 1962. In 1970, Quinn was named pastor of St. Gabriel Parish in San Francisco, his first pastoral position. He became president of the priests senate in 1973.

== Auxiliary Bishop of San Francisco ==
Pope Paul VI on April 24, 1978, appointed Quinn as titular bishop of Numana and as an auxiliary bishop of San Francisco. He was consecrated on June 28, 1978, by Archbishop John Raphael Quinn at the Cathedral of Saint Mary of the Assumption in San Francisco.

== Bishop of Sacramento ==
On December 18, 1979, Pope John Paul II appointed Quinn as bishop of Sacramento.

From 1980 to 1992, seven new parishes, several missions, two elementary schools, and one high school were established. He oversaw a 10-year pastoral plan for the diocese as well as a spiritual renewal program, reorganized the deanery structure, initiated a diocesan pastoral council, and celebrated the hundredth anniversary of the diocese.

Quinn inspired and encouraged women to lead in parish governance, educational, liturgical, financial and social ministries. He also activated lay individuals to continue their formation and assume leadership roles in various groups and movements. He supported the launch of an HIV/AIDS hospice and he protested the death penalty on the steps of the California State Capitol in Sacramento and at prison gates. He also spoke up regarding nuclear disarmament, immigration policies, and many foreign issues.

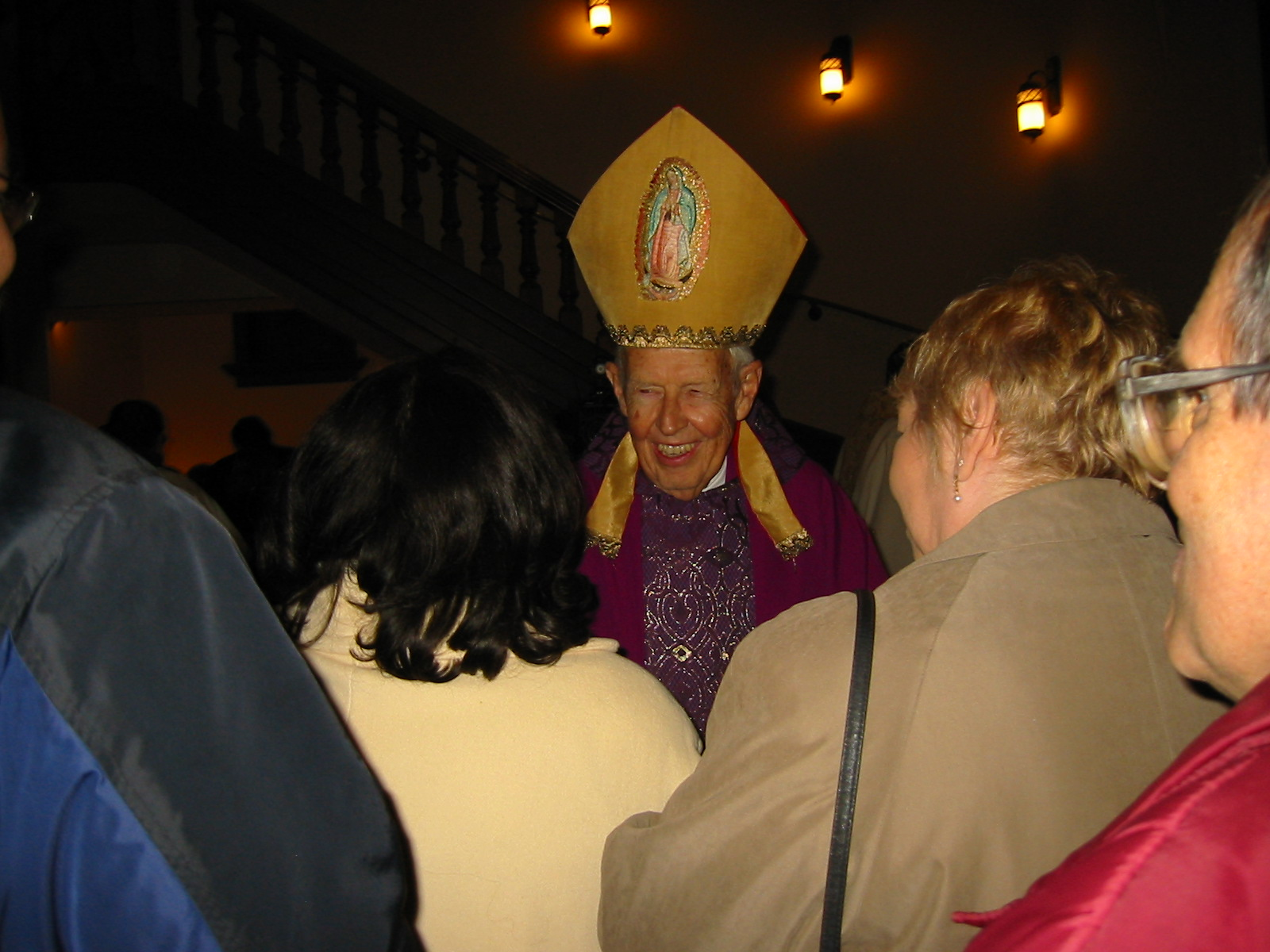
Bishop Quinn at the beatification ceremony for Bishop Alphonse Gallegos(2004)

== Retirement and death ==
Quinn retired in 1993, then spent several years with the Yaquis people in Arizona. In 2007, he returned to the Diocese of Sacramento. He took up residence at Mercy McMahon Terrace, a residence for seniors run by the Sisters of Mercy in midtown Sacramento, and continued to serve as an activist for social justice and human rights issues, especially for the poor.

Quinn died in Sacramento on March 21, 2019, at age 97. At the time of his death, he was the oldest living bishop in the United States.

The former Bishop Quinn High School in Palo Cedro, California was named in his honor.

== See also ==
- Catholic Church hierarchy
- Catholic Church in the United States
- Historical list of the Catholic bishops of the United States
- List of Catholic bishops of the United States
- Lists of patriarchs, archbishops, and bishops

== Episcopal succession ==
Catholic Church titles
Preceded by Alden John Bell	Bishop of Sacramento; 1979–1993	Succeeded by William Weigand
Preceded by -	Auxiliary Bishop of San Francisco; 1978–1979	Succeeded by -
