= KPYV =

Radio station in Oroville, California

- Oroville, California; United States
- Broadcast area: Chico, California
- Frequency: 1340 kHz
- Branding: Radio Santísimo Sacramento

Programming
- Language: Spanish
- Format: Catholic radio

Ownership
- Owner: Roman Catholic Diocese of Sacramento; (Radio Santisimo Sacramento, Inc.)
- Sister stations: KCVV

History
- First air date: 1962
- Former call signs: KAOR (1962–1973); KORV (1973–1996); KJAZ (1996–2000); KEWE (2000–2013); KNTF (2013–2014)

Technical information
- Licensing authority: FCC
- Facility ID: 50710
- Class: C
- Power: 1,000 watts
- Transmitter coordinates: 39°30′31.6″N 121°35′57.9″W

Links
- Public license information: Public file; LMS
- Website: radiosantisimosacramento.com

KPYV (1340 AM) is a radio station based in Chico, California and licensed to Oroville, California, United States. The station is owned by the Roman Catholic Diocese of Sacramento, through licensee Radio Santisimo Sacramento, Inc. The station used to be an affiliate of ESPN Radio and Fox Sports Radio. On September 24, 2013, the then-KEWE changed its format to adult alternative. In 2014 it changed to Spanish Catholic.

== History ==
The station went on the air with the call sign KAOR. It was assigned the call letters KORV on April 4, 1973, then KJAZ on October 1, 1996. On May 17, 2000, the station changed its call sign to KEWE, and again to KNTF on September 27, 2013. On June 3, 2014, the station changed its call sign to the current KPYV.
