= Eugene O'Connell =

Catholic bishop

Right Reverend Eugene O'Connell
- Bishop of Grass Valley
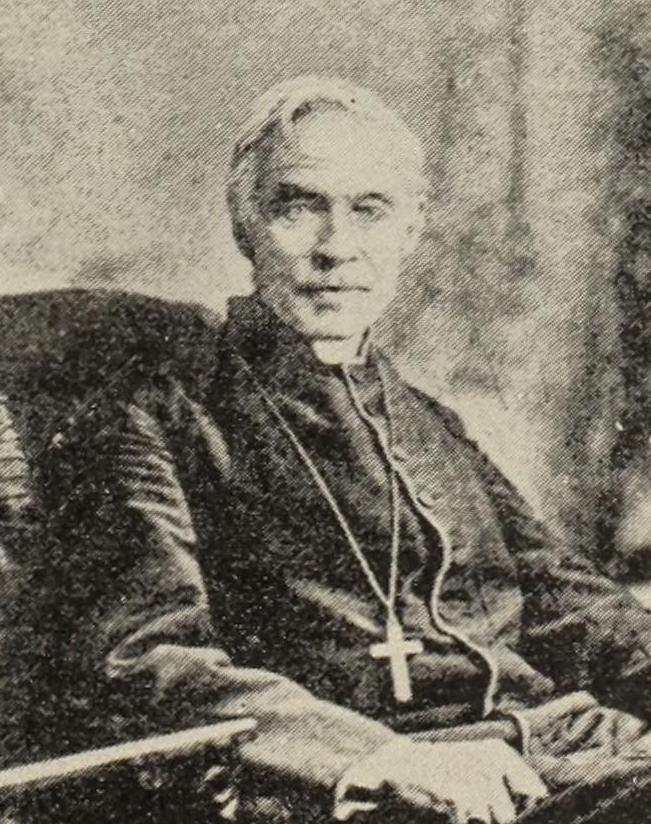
- Church: Catholic Church
- Diocese: Catholic Diocese of Grass Valley
- Appointed: 3 February 1861

Orders
- Ordination: 21 May 1842 by Daniel Murray
- Consecration: 3 February 1861 by Paul Cullen

Personal details
- Born: Kingscourt, Ireland
- Died: 4 December 1891

Styles of Eugene O'Connell
- Reference style: The Most Reverend
- Spoken style: Your Excellency
- Religious style: Monsignor
- Posthumous style: not applicable

Eugene O'Connell (June 18, 1815 – December 14, 1891) was the first Catholic bishop of the Catholic Diocese of Grass Valley, California. Born in County Cavan, Ireland, O'Connell sailed to San Francisco upon the request of Bishop Alemany for priests to serve in the diocese of Monterey. O'Connell was rector of the diocesan seminary, and later appointed to the Vicariate of Marysville, up in the gold fields. The Diocese of Grass Valley later became the Diocese of Sacramento.

== Early life ==
O'Connell was born June 15, 1815, the eldest of four children, in the parish of Kingscourt, County Cavan. He studied at the diocesan seminary, St. Finian's College in Navan, then at St. Patrick's College, Maynooth, and was ordained to the priesthood on May 21, 1842. O'Connell taught at the seminary in Navan from 1843 to 1846. O'Connell then moved to All Hallows College, Dublin. During this time, he witnessed the terrible famine years of 1845–1848 in Ireland.

== California ==
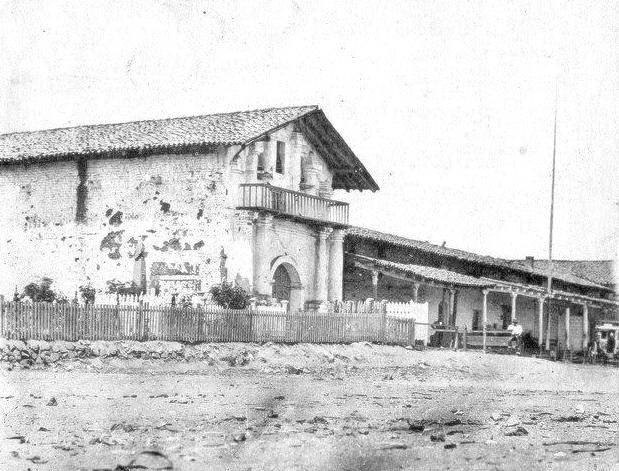
Mission Delores, 1856

In August 1850, Joseph Sadoc Alemany, Bishop of Monterey, California stopped by All Hallows on his way back from Rome, looking to recruit priests for his new diocese. O'Connell agreed to serve three years. He arrived in San Francisco on July 1, 1851, and was appointed pastor of Mission Santa Inez, where he was also director of the diocesan seminary. O'Connell had to learn Spanish to serve the parishioners and teach the seminarians.

In November 1852, O'Connell was assigned to the Church of St. Francis on Vallejo Street in San Francisco. In September 1853, he was named pastor of Mission Delores. There he served as rector and professor of the Diocesan Seminary of St. Thomas Acquinas. The following year Father O'Connell was recalled to All Hallows College in Ireland. He left San Francisco in May 1854 and was appointed Dean of All Hallows.

On September 26, 1860 Pope Pius IX appointed O'Connell was Vicar Apostolic of the newly established Vicariate Apostolic of Marysville. He journeyed to Rome to ask to be relieved of the appointment. When Pope Pius IX declined, O'Connell responded, "“You mean I am condemned to the mines.” He was consecrated titular Bishop of Flaviopolis, and Vicar Apostolic of Marysville, 3 Feb., 1861, at All Hallows College, by Cardinal Paul Cullen, Archbishop of Dublin. O'Connell reached Marysville 8 June, and was inducted on the following day at St. Joseph's Pro-cathedral by Archbishop Alemany.

== Bishop of Grass Valley ==
In 1868 the vicariate was erected into the Diocese of Grass Valley and Bishop O'Connell was transferred to this title 3 Feb. of that year. Located in northeastern California, United States, the diocese also included most of Nevada, and, early in its history, Utah and part of Colorado. St. Joseph Church in Marysville served as the pro-cathedral of the vicarate. While the diocese was erected in Grass Valley, O'Connell chose to live in Marysville. He recruited a number of priests to serve in his diocese from All Hallows in Dublin.

He served as a Council Father to the First Vatican Council convoked by Pope Pius IX. He also attended the Third Plenary Council of Baltimore in 1884.

He was instrumental in choosing then Father Patrick Manogue to start a ministry in the Nevada Territory. Along with Manogue, O'Connell encouraged the Daughters of Charity to help in Nevada. He dedicated Saint Mary in the Mountains Catholic Church in 1864. In 1881, Minogue became his coadjutor.

== Final years ==
O'Connell retired on March 17, 1884. On that date, he was appointed as titular bishop of Ioppe. He died in Los Angeles, California, on December 4, 1891.

The remains of Eugene O'Connell were moved from Los Angeles to Sacramento over a hundred years after his death.

Catholic Church titles
Preceded by Elías Rodríguez Ortiz	— TITULAR — Archbishop of Flaviopolis; 28 September 1860 - 3 March 1868	Succeeded by François Laouënan
New creation	Vicar Apostolic of Marysville; 28 September 1860 - 3 March 1868	Vicariate elevated to diocese
New creation	Bishop of Grass Valley; 3 March 1868 - 29 February 1884	Succeeded by Patrick Manogue
