= KCVV =

Radio station in Sacramento

Coordinates: 38°35′16.7″N 121°28′8.8″W

- Sacramento, California; United States
- Broadcast area: Sacramento metropolitan area
- Frequency: 1240 kHz
- Branding: Radio Santísimo Sacramento

Programming
- Format: Spanish language Catholic Radio

Ownership
- Owner: Roman Catholic Diocese of Sacramento; (Radio Santísimo Sacramento, Inc.)
- Sister stations: KPYV

History
- First air date: March 15, 1937
- Former call signs: KROY (1937–1982); KENZ (1982–1985); KSAC (1985–1994); KSQR (1994–2005); KSAC (2005–2008); KRJY (2008–2011)
- Former frequencies: 1210 kHz (1937–1941)

Technical information
- Licensing authority: FCC
- Facility ID: 29297
- Class: C
- Power: 1,000 watts 250 watts (translator)
- Translator: 95.7 K239CK (Elk Grove)

Links
- Public license information: Public file; LMS
- Webcast: Listen Live
- Website: radiosantisimosacramento.com

KCVV (1240 kHz) is an AM radio station in Sacramento, California. It is owned by the Roman Catholic Diocese of Sacramento and airs a Spanish language Catholic radio format. English language Catholic programming is heard on KSMH (1620 AM) in West Sacramento.

KCVV is powered at 1,000 watts, using a non-directional antenna. The transmitter is off 28th Street in Sacramento, near the American River. Programming is also heard on 250 watt FM translator K239CK at 95.7 MHz in nearby Elk Grove, California.

== History ==
The station was established as KROY in 1937, making it the second-oldest station in Sacramento. The oldest station, KFBK (1530 AM), traces its history back to 1922.

The station now known as KCVV originally had the call sign KROY from 1937 to 1982, when it became KENZ, then adopted call letters KSAC in 1985, KSQR in 1994, KSAC again in 2005, and KRJY in 2008. Throughout its early years, KROY had been host to a number of formats, dating back to the "swing era." By 1960, the format had been changed to top 40. From the fall of 1968 until well into the 1970s, KROY was the top rated radio station in Sacramento. Its branding until March 30, 2008 was "Talk City".

=== KROY ===
On August 2, 1935, Royal Miller applied for a construction permit for a new radio station in Sacramento. The Federal Communications Commission approved the application in July 1936, and KROY signed on March 15, 1937, with Governor Frank F. Merriam delivering the first words over the new station, originally at 1210 kHz. KROY was initially a 100-watt, daytime-only station, broadcasting from studios on the mezzanine level of the Hotel Sacramento. After a bid to do so was denied in 1937, KROY was allowed to broadcast at night in 1939, doing so beginning July 31. One of the station's early employees was Elton Rule, who would later become the president of the American Broadcasting Company from 1972 to 1983.

January 1938 brought KROY an affiliation with the Columbia Broadcasting System; the network had aired in Sacramento over KFBK until that station affiliated with NBC. As with most stations on 1210 kHz, KROY moved to 1240 kHz on March 29, 1941, with the enactment of NARBA. The FCC rebuffed a bid to upgrade to 10,000 watts at 1030 kHz in 1942, but it did permit the station to increase to 250 watts the next year. The Millers owned KROY through 1946, when it was sold to Harmco, Inc., owned by Mr. and Mrs. George Harm and Clyde F. Coombs, all of Fresno. An application by Luther Gibson to buy the station was denied. KROY was sold in 1952 to a consortium headed by George L. McCarthy for $425,000. However, three years later, Robert W. Dumm bought an 80 percent stake in the station for just $97,500. Under Dumm, KROY moved its studios to 11th and J Streets (1010 11th Street) in 1956.

In June 1959, John T. Carey bought KROY and an associated FM construction permit for 102.5 MHz, which would never be built, for $390,000.

=== Going Top 40 ===
On January 4, 1960, KROY disaffiliated from CBS; KFBK had eased in CBS programming beginning the prior month, with a full affiliation to begin in June. Later that year, Lincoln Dellar acquired KROY; at the time, Dellar was an executive at KXOA (1470 AM), and he had also founded short-lived KCCC-TV, Sacramento's first television station. Dellar moved to increase KROY's power to its present 1,000 watts the next year.

KROY spent the next two decades as one of Sacramento's two major Top 40 outlets, competing against KXOA. The station became a honing ground for many disc jockeys who would find fame nationwide. Morning drive personalities in the 1960s included Gary Owens, Don MacKinnon, and Robert W. Morgan. Ratings remained near the top of the market as late as the end of the 1970s. The station was sold several times: in 1962 to Sacramento Broadcasters and in 1968 to Atlantic States Industries.

In 1975, Atlantic States acquired EZ Communications's KEZS (96.9 FM); to indicate its new sister station, the call letters were changed to KROI. KROY-KROI was acquired in 1978 by Jonsson Broadcasting Corporation, with the two stations fetching $1.65 million and $1.1 million, respectively. While separately programmed as an album-oriented rock station, KROI became KROY-FM on April 23, 1979, as the separate KROI designation confused advertisers.

=== The 1980s and beyond ===
In January 1981, KROY shifted to adult rock, seeking to capture the aging baby boomer audience. The next year, to give the AM station a separate identity, the call letters were changed to KENZ. (Eventually, KROY-FM would become a contemporary hit radio station, following in the mold of its former AM sister.) Dick Tracy, radio columnist for the Sacramento Bee, questioned Jonsson's management of its Sacramento stations, noting that "long-range ineptitude" had caused listenership to 1240 AM—and to 96.9 FM, which was renamed KSAC in 1984—to decline considerably.

In 1985, Jonsson sold its two Sacramento radio stations to Commonwealth Broadcasting for $12 million. Commonwealth relaunched 96.9 FM as KROY-FM, restoring the call letters that Jonsson had moved to a station in Reno, and moved KSAC to 1240 AM.

In September 1987, it became a classical music station, perhaps being the first radio station in California to exclusively use compact discs. It was also the only Classical station in the Sacramento area on AM. During the 1990s, KSAC changed ownership and format numerous times. For more than a month, beginning on February 12, 2008, there were mild rumors that KSAC would switch from progressive talk to gospel. The Sacramento Bee confirmed those rumors on March 28, 2008. The switch, along with the call-letter change to KRJY, happened on Sunday, March 30, 2008. KRJY was also the "flagship station" of the Sacramento State Hornets athletic programs.

The station went dark on April 29, 2010, when the station was evicted from its transmitter site. The station was scheduled to return to the air on June 29, 2010, from a temporary long-wired site in West Sacramento near the Port of Sacramento. However, it was announced on August 25, 2010 that it had filed papers to change the status of KRJY from commercial to non-commercial and assign the license to a non-profit version of Diamond Broadcasting.

The station was sold to the Roman Catholic Diocese of Sacramento in 2011. Upon transfer of ownership, the station signed back on at full power at the original transmitting site, and began airing Spanish-language Catholic programming.
