= Patrick Manogue =

Irish-born prelate of the Catholic Church in America (1831–1895)

His Eminence, Right Reverend Patrick Manogue
- Bishop of Sacramento
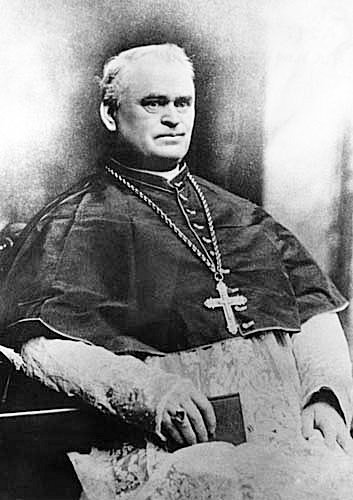
- Manogue c. 1885 – 1887
- Church: Catholic
- See: Diocese of Sacramento
- Appointed: May 28, 1886
- Term ended: February 27, 1895
- Predecessor: Diocese erected
- Successor: Thomas Grace
- Previous posts: Titular Bishop of Ceramus (1880–1884); Coadjutor Bishop of Diocese of Grass Valley (1880–1884); Bishop of Grass Valley (1884–1886)

Personal details
- Born: May 28, 1831 (Note: Catholic-Hierarchy.org reports Manogue's birth year as 1831, but the Diocese of Sacramento says 1932. A photograph of the plaque marking Manogue's remains in the Bishop's Crypt of St. Mary's Cemetery and Mausoleum, Sacramento, lists his year of birth as 1831: "NATUS IN HIBERNIA MDCCCXXXI" (Born in Ireland 1831). See Findagrave Memorial No. 144880086.) County Kilkenny, Ireland
- Died: February 27, 1895 (aged 63) Sacramento, California, US
- Education: Saint Sulpice Seminary, Paris

Ordination history
History
Priestly ordination
- Ordained by: François-Nicholas-Madeleine Morlot
Episcopal consecration
- Principal consecrator: Joseph Sadoc Alemany y Conill
- Co-consecrators: Francisco Mora y Borrell, Eugene O'Connell

Styles of Patrick Manogue
- Reference style: Right Reverend
- Spoken style: Your Excellency
- Religious style: Monsignor
- Posthumous style: not applicable

Patrick Manogue (May 28, 1831 – February 27, 1895) was an Irish-born prelate of the Catholic Church in America. He served as the founding bishop of the Diocese of Sacramento in California from 1886 until his death in 1895. He previously served as bishop of the Diocese of Grass Valley in California from 1881 until 1886.

Manogue was a pioneer of Catholicism in the Nevada Territory.

== Biography ==
=== Early life ===
Patrick Manogue was born in County Kilkenny, Ireland, in 1831. Emigrating to the United States, he left college to support his siblings. Manogue moved to Moore's Flat, California, where he prospected for gold. One of his fellow "ordinary miners", John Mackay, would spearhead the building of the Cathedral of the Blessed Sacrament starting in 1887.

After four years of prospecting, Manogue earned enough money to pay his tuition at Saint Sulpice Seminary, Paris. While at Saint Sulpice, Manogue admired its church; he would use it as a model for his future diocesan cathedral.

=== Priesthood ===
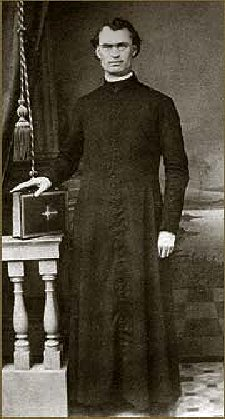
Reverend Manogue (1860s)

Manogue was ordained to the priesthood on December 21, 1861. Bishop Eugene O'Connell chose him to start a ministry in the Nevada Territory. O'Connell felt that a former miner was best suited for a ministry to the growing Nevada mining community. The first Catholic church in the Comstock, which stood for only a year, had been blown down by heavy storm in 1861. Along with O'Connell, Manogue encouraged the Daughters of Charity to help populate pioneer churches in Nevada. The modest, wooden St. Mary's in the Mountains was completed in 1862.

=== Coadjutor Bishop and Bishop of Grass Valley ===
On July 27, 1880, Manogue was appointed as coadjutor bishop of Grass Valley. He was consecrated bishop on January 16, 1881, by Archbishop Joseph Sadoc Alemany y Conill. His principal co-consecrators were Archbishop Francisco Mora y Borrell and Bishop O'Connell.

On February 29, 1884, Manogue succeeded O'Connell as the second and last diocesan bishop of Grass Valley. Manogue served two years as its final diocesan bishop.

=== Bishop of Sacramento ===
On May 28, 1886, the Vatican merged the Diocese of Grass Valley into the newly erected Diocese of Sacramento. Manogue became its founding bishop and in effect the second bishop of the Sacramento diocese. The new diocese needed a cathedral and with help of Mackay and other influential miners, Manogue built his cathedral on land donated by the first governor of California, Peter Burnett.

=== Death and legacy ===
Patrick Manogue died in the Cathedral of the Blessed Sacrament rectory in Sacramento on February 27, 1895. The following were named after Manogue

- Bishop Manogue Assembly 50, Knights of Columbus
- Bishop Manogue High School in Reno.
- Bishop Manogue High School, a former female school in the Sacramento Diocese, was named for this Bishop. This school was merged with Christian Brothers High School which hosted a "Bishop Manogue Derby Day" celebrating the Kentucky Derby at the second annual Bishop Manogue H.S. reunion on May 1, 2010.

Manogue was portrayed by Steve Cochran in the western television series Death Valley Days episode The Westside of Heaven, which aired on March 1, 1964.

== Notes ==
Catholic Church titles
| Preceded by Eugene O'Connell | Diocese of Grass Valley; February 29, 1884–May 26, 1886 | Succeeded by Last Diocesan Bishop |
| Preceded by Founding Bishop | Diocese of Sacramento; May 26, 1886–February 27, 1895 | Succeeded by Thomas Grace |
