= Nordic Chinese Christian Church =

Organization of Chinese churches in Europe

Nordic Chinese Christian Church (NCCC, Traditional Chinese: 北歐華人基督教會) is a collaboration of Chinese churches/congregations in Northern Europe, with the largest ones being in Stockholm, Gothenburg, Malmö in Sweden, Oslo, Stavanger in Norway and Helsinki in Finland. It was up until 2010 called Scandinavia Chinese Christian Church, but with the inclusion of the Chinese church in Finland, found it better to change the name to the current one.
