= Roman Catholic Diocese of Grass Valley =

Former residential diocese of the Catholic Church

Coordinates: 39.2192°N 121.0580°W

The Diocese of Grass Valley (Latin: Dioecesis Vallispratensis) now a titular see, was formerly a residential Latin Church diocese of the Catholic Church located in northeastern California, United States. The diocese also included most of Nevada, and, early in its history, Utah and part of Colorado.

== History ==
The particular church that became the Diocese of Grass Valley was erected in by Pope Pius IX in 1860 as the Vicariate Apostolic of Marysville from territory formerly belonging to the Archdiocese of San Francisco, of which it was a suffragan see. In 1868, the see city was changed to Grass Valley, and the vicariate was renamed and elevated by Pius IX to a diocese.

St. Joseph Church in Marysville served as the pro-cathedral of the vicarate. When the vicarate was elevated to a diocese, Bishop Eugene O'Connell resisted the change of see city to Grass Valley, and continued using St. Joseph's as his pro-cathedral. St. Patrick Cathedral in Grass Valley was the official cathedral approved by the Vatican.

The diocese served the large mining population in the Sierra Nevada during the California Gold Rush. By 1886, commercial mining in the Gold Country had slowed considerably, significantly reducing the population in the area, and the diocese was suppressed. Much of its territory became part of the Diocese of Sacramento.

== Second diocesan bishop ==
On July 27, 1880 Bishop Patrick Manogue was appointed as coadjutor bishop of the Grass Valley Diocese. On May 24, 1884, Manogue succeeded O’Connell as the second and last diocesan bishop of Grass Valley. Manogue served two years as the final diocesan bishop.

== Suppression of diocese ==
On May 28, 1886 this diocese was suppressed when the Diocese of Sacramento was erected. Manogue became its founding bishop and in effect the second bishop of the Sacramento diocese.

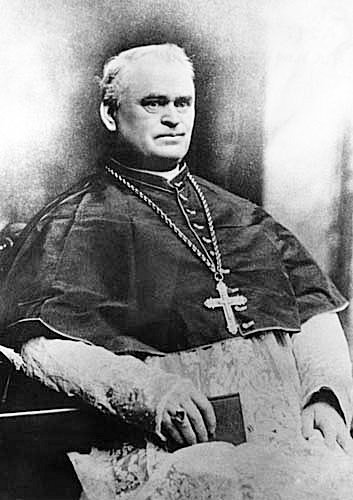
Bishop Patrick Manogue.

== Restoration ==
In 1997, Pope John Paul II restored the see as a titular see. The current titular bishop of Grass Valley is Christie Macaluso, an auxiliary bishop of the Archdiocese of Hartford.

== Ordinaries ==
Vicar Apostolic of Marysville

1. Eugene O'Connell (1860–1868)

Bishop of Grass Valley

1. Eugene O’Connell (1868–1884)
2. Patrick Manogue (1884–1886)

Titular Bishop of Grass Valley

1. Christie Macaluso (1997–present)

== See also ==
- List of Catholic titular sees
