= Cathedral of the Blessed Sacrament (Sacramento, California) =

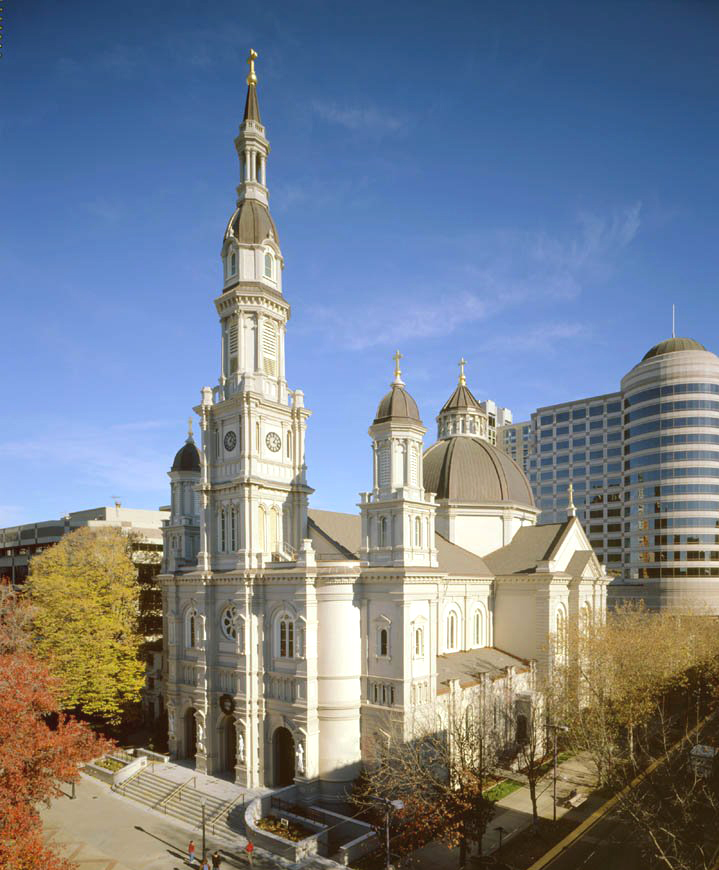
- The Cathedral of the Blessed Sacrament from the intersection of K and 11th Streets in Downtown Sacramento

- Location in California Cathedral of the Blessed Sacrament (the United States)
- 38°34′44″N 121°29′31″W
- Location: 1017 11th St. Sacramento, California
- Country: United States
- Denomination: Catholic Church
- Sui iuris church: Latin Church
- Churchmanship: Roman Rite
- Website: www.cathedralsacramento.org

History
- Founded: 1886

Architecture
- Architect: Bryan J. Klinch
- Style: Italian Renaissance
- Completed: June 12, 1889
- Construction cost: $250,000 (1889 estimate)

Specifications
- Capacity: 1,400 seats
- Length: 200 feet (61 m)
- Width: 100 feet (30 m)
- Materials: brick, mortar, wood, reinforced concrete, steel frame

Administration
- Diocese: Diocese of Sacramento

Clergy
- Bishop: Most Rev. Jaime Soto
- Rector: Rev. Michael O'Reilly

The Cathedral of the Blessed Sacrament is the Catholic cathedral of the Diocese of Sacramento in Sacramento, California, United States. It is the seat of Bishop Jaime Soto. The cathedral is located downtown Sacramento at the intersection of 11th and K Streets.

The cathedral is considered both a religious and civic landmark. The diocese stretches from the southern edge of Sacramento County north to the Oregon border and serves approximately 1,000,000 Catholics. The diocese encompasses 102 churches in a 42,000 square mile region. The Cathedral of the Blessed Sacrament is one of the largest cathedrals west of the Mississippi River. Because of its size, it has sometimes been used as the site of final funeral Masses for former governors of California, most recently that of Pat Brown in 1996.

== History ==
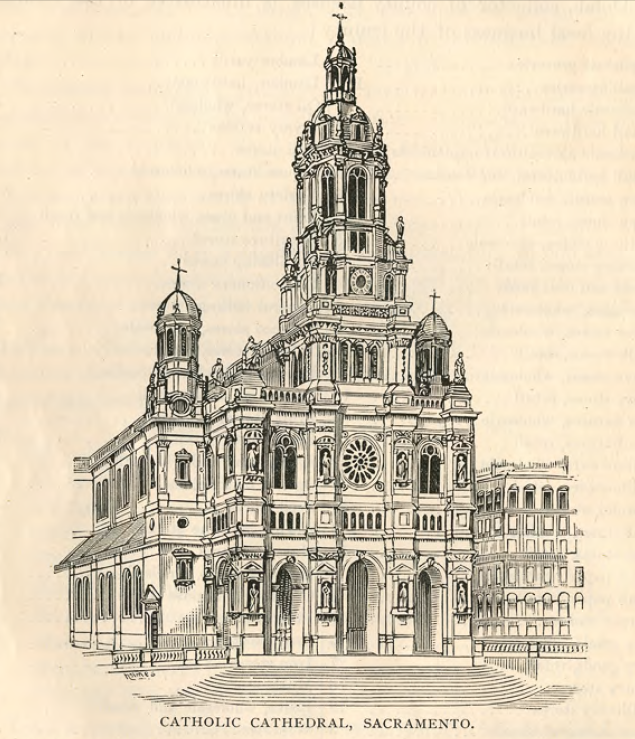
The cathedral in 1888

With construction beginning in 1887, Sacramento’s Cathedral of the Blessed Sacrament is an example of the history in Sacramento's architecture. With a recent restoration project that loops together the Catholic denomination. The Cathedral of the Blessed Sacrament combines Sacramento's history with its modern-day life.

Among the first of thousands to seek his fortune in the Sacramento region during the California Gold Rush, Patrick Manogue had aspirations that differed from many of his fellow fortune seekers. His goal was to earn enough money to finance a trip to Paris, where he planned to enroll in seminary college and become a Roman Catholic priest.

While studying in Paris in 1860, Manogue became enchanted by the cathedrals and their role in a city's community life. In 1886, Manogue was appointed as Sacramento's first bishop. Inspired by churches he'd seen in European plazas, Manogue worked to secure property just one block away from the State Capitol, with a dream of building a cathedral in Sacramento. Manogue modeled the cathedral after L'Eglise de la Sainte-Trinite (The Church of the Holy Trinity) in Paris. Once completed, there was no cathedral equal in size west of the Mississippi River. The building is a modified basilica form approximately 200 feet (61 m) long and 100 feet (30 m) wide, and it seats 1400 people. The central bell tower rises 215 feet (66 m).

=== Renovation ===
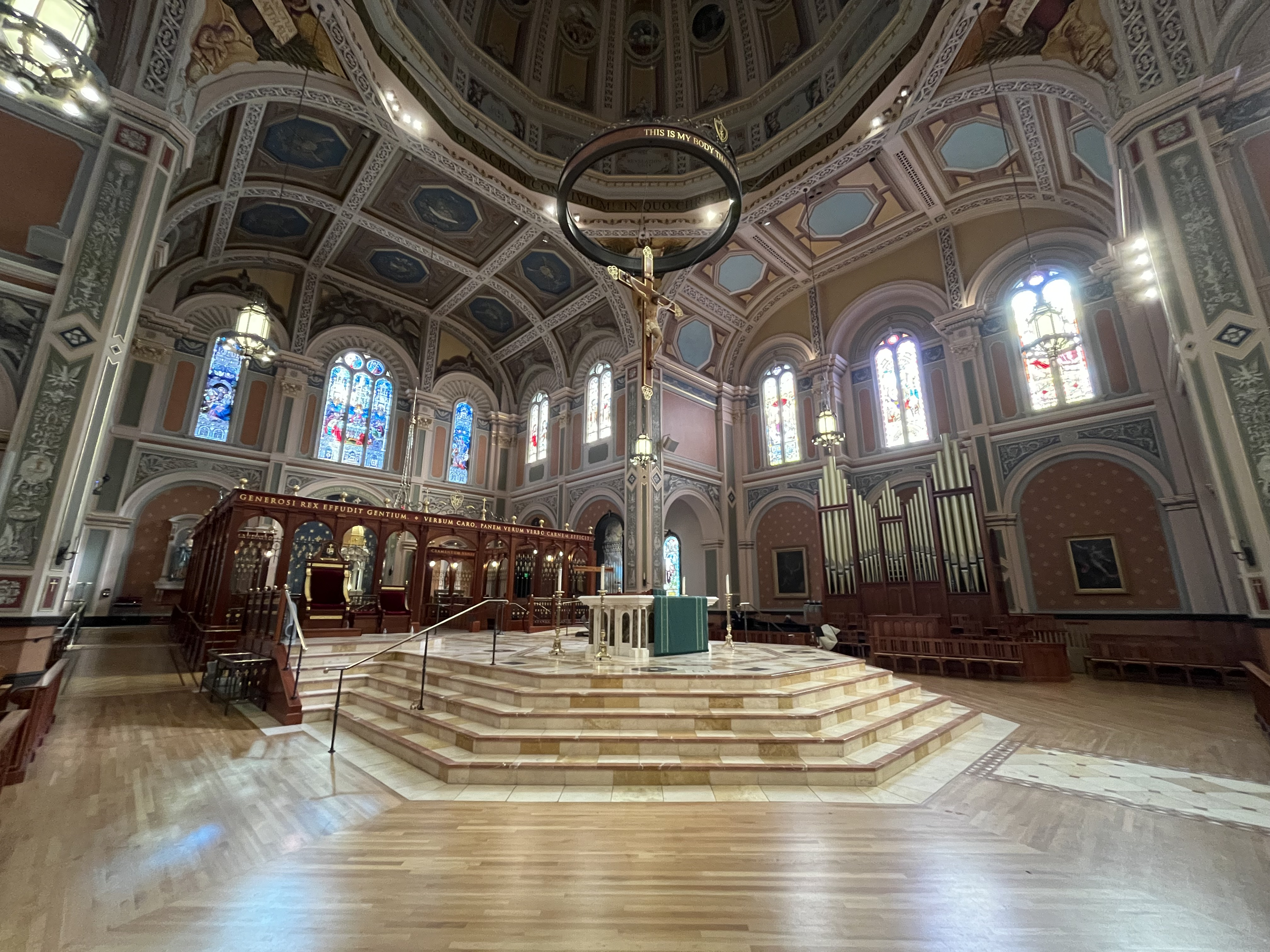
The altar and crucifix in 2025

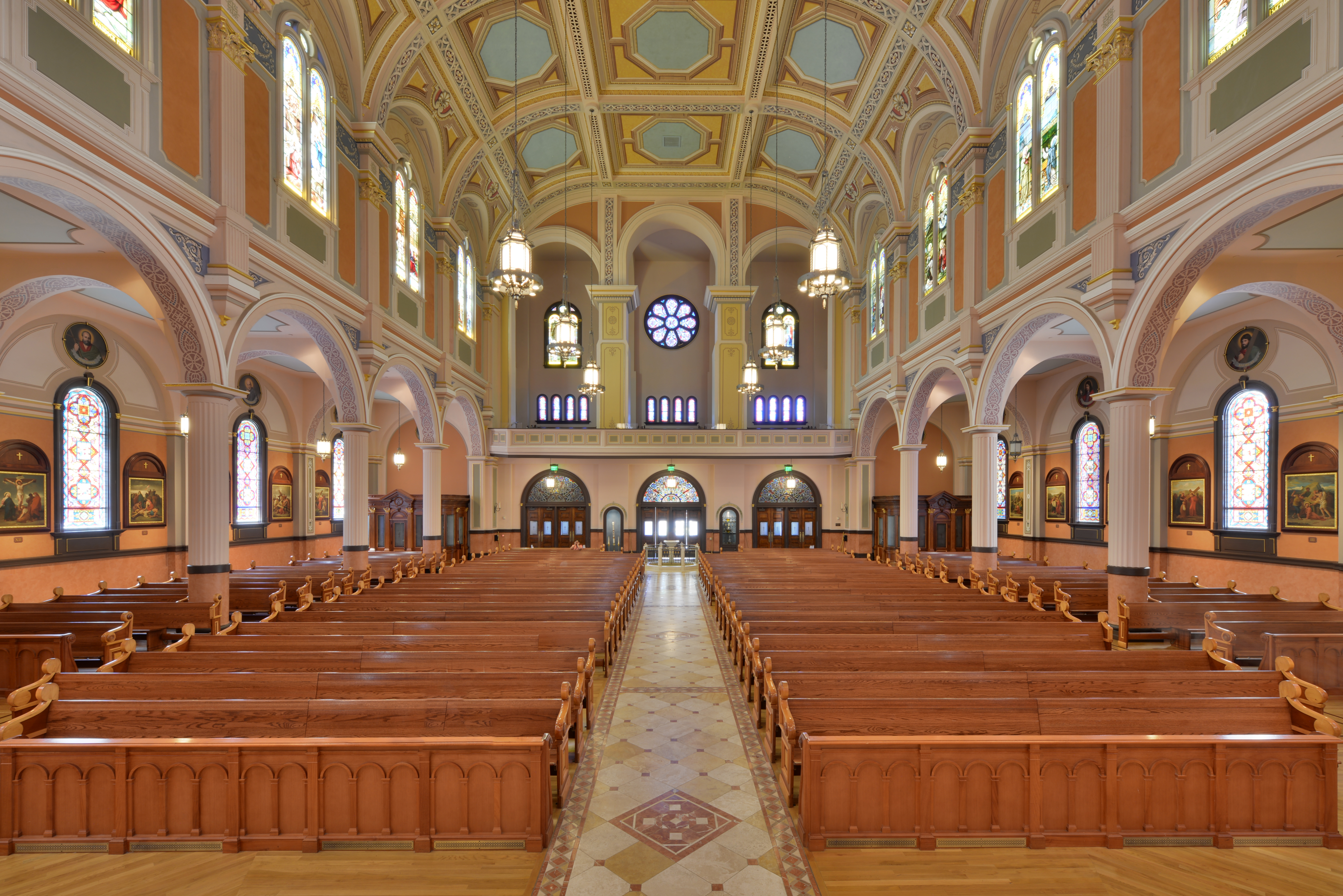
View from the altar towards the nave in 2013

The architectural style of the church is Italian Renaissance on the exterior and Victorian on the interior. The church has been updated for modern use, but designers tried to keep the church in the original style. Over the years, with repairs, changes in color schemes and changes to the liturgy, the church lost its stylistic unity.

From August 2003 until November 2005, the cathedral closed for extensive remodeling to unify the church's décor from the numerous renovations throughout the years. In this renovation were significant additions including a Eucharistic chapel, two side chapels, and a large crucifix below the domed crossing. But the largest change was the re-opening of the dome, which was closed in the 1930s for acoustic reasons. The Eucharistic chapel (or Blessed Sacrament Chapel) pays an architectural homage to the chancel screens of medieval churches. It allows for the tabernacle to remain in plain view of the congregation and be in line with the high altar while also allowing for a private devotional space outside of the celebration of the Mass. The words of the Eucharistic hymn Pange Lingua Gloriosi are inscribed in gold lettering on the screen.

Every part of the cathedral was updated in the restoration ranging from expanded pews to better lighting with decorative painting on the interior walls and ceiling. The massive stained glass windows in the building were cleaned and releaded. The church includes a new bishop's cathedra (episcopal chair) and ambo of mahogany.

Above the altar hangs a 13-foot (4.0 m) crucifix with a crown overhead that is 14 feet (4.3 m) in diameter. Combined they weigh almost 2,000 lb (910 kg) and are held in place with aircraft cables.

The interior dome of the cathedral, which stands 110 feet (34 m) high, was rebuilt, some 70 years after the original one was blocked from view. The dove in the oculus, with a wingspan of 7 ft (2.1 m), is “a dramatic reminder of the Holy Spirit’s presence in the life of the church, especially in the celebration of the Eucharist,” according to Father James Murphy who was the rector of the cathedral during its renovation. Sixteen large rondels, each 5 ft (1.5 m) in diameter, decorate the new dome, portraying Eucharistic scenes from Scripture.

An octagonal marble baptismal font with a decorative mosaic is at the entrance to the cathedral. Two side chapels — the Martyrs Chapel and the Chapel of Our Lady and Saints of the Americas — provide a space for private devotion to the saints. Two, 20-foot (6.1 m) high murals, painted by artists from EverGreene Painting Studios in New York, adorn the chapels.

The large, weight-bearing columns of the cathedral were hollowed and workers installed 320 LT (330,000 kg) of steel to reinforce the masonry of the cathedral walls. Workers used a powerful epoxy with the steel to bond components to the structure and enable the building to withstand an earthquake measuring 8.0 on the Richter scale.

The cathedral's original organ had been removed in 1970 and been replaced in 1977 with a small nine-rank instrument that was inadequate to serve the cathedral's needs. The Reuter Organ Company constructed and installed a new organ with 15-ranks that incorporates the pipes from the earlier instrument.

The restoration is the largest financial project the diocese has ever undertaken, with the $34 million cost coming from various sources. The diocese's 2002 capital campaign provided $10 million and another $10 came from diocesan investments. An additional $2 million was raised by cathedral parishioners. Diocesan officials are now conducting a campaign for the remaining $12 million (January 2005 estimate).

== Gallery ==
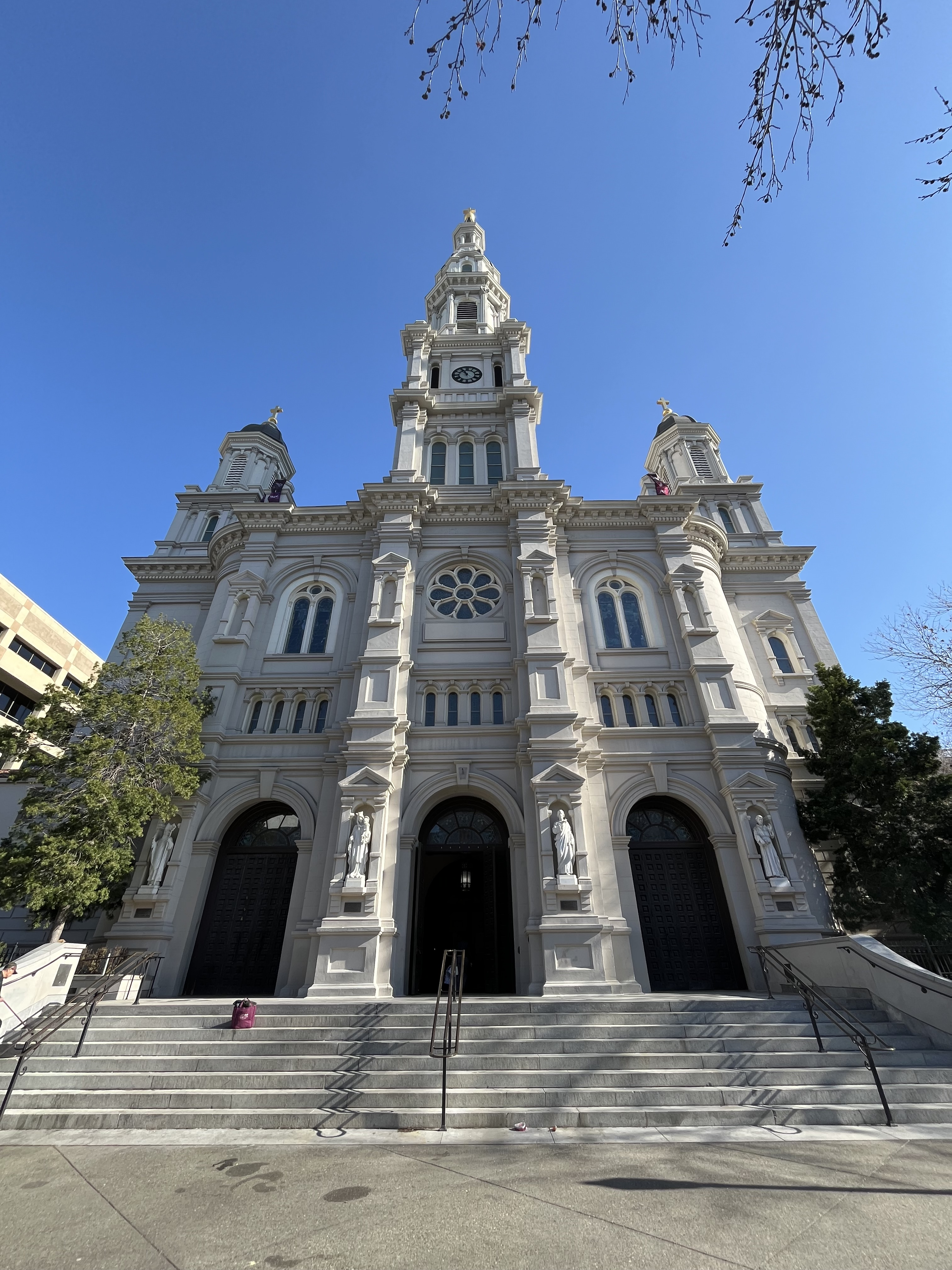
Façade in 2025

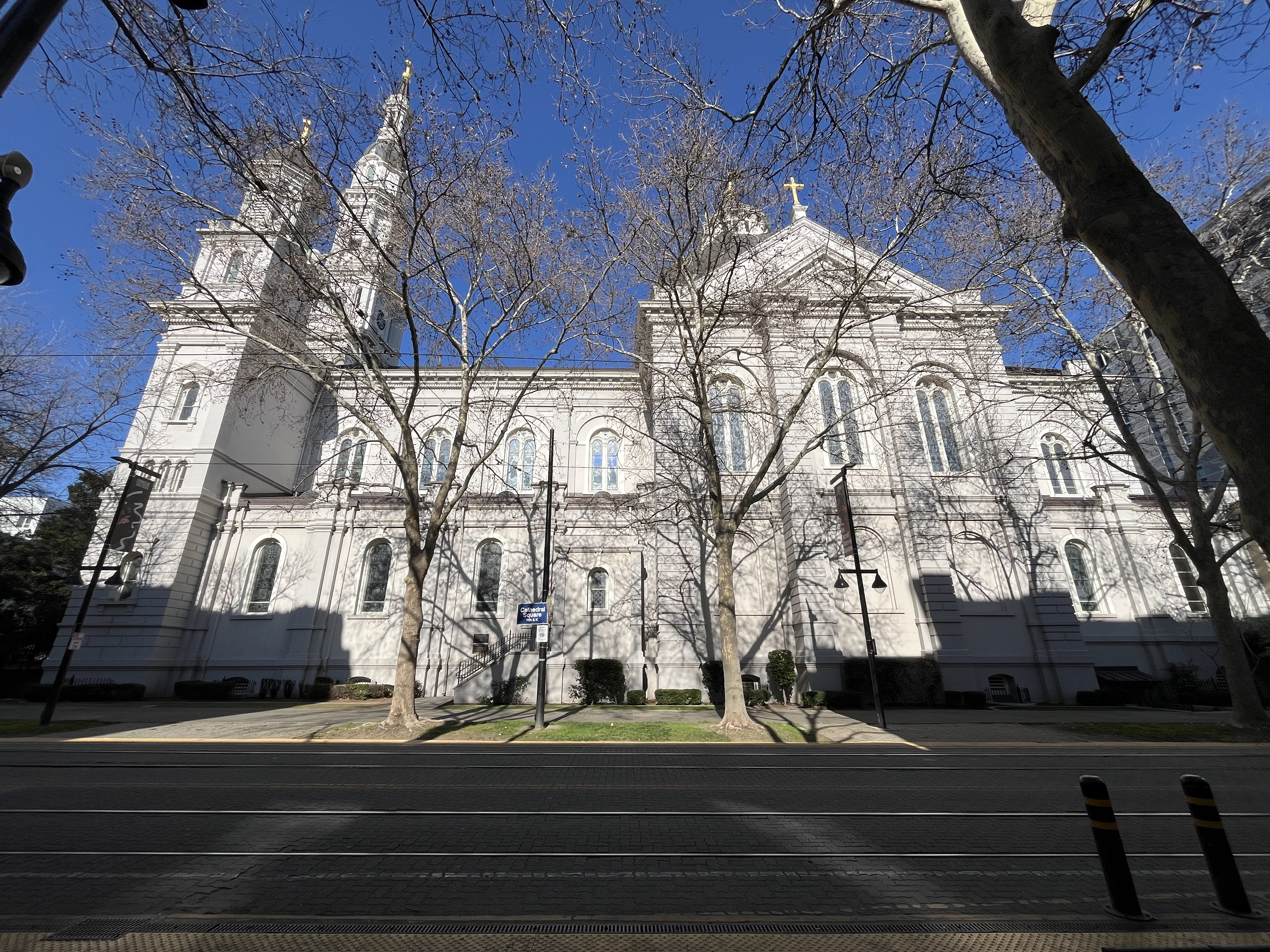
Side in 2025

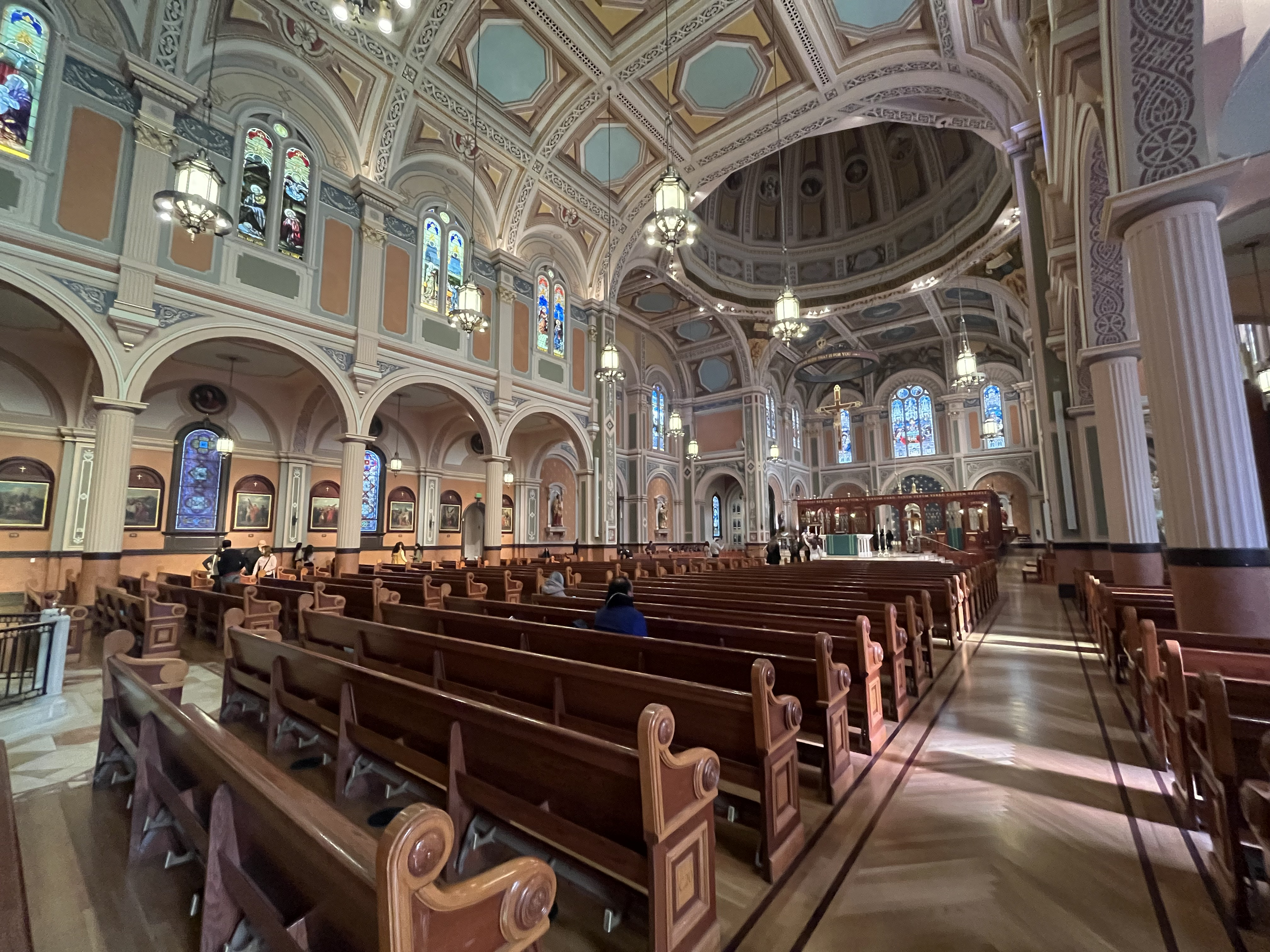
Interior wide view in 2025

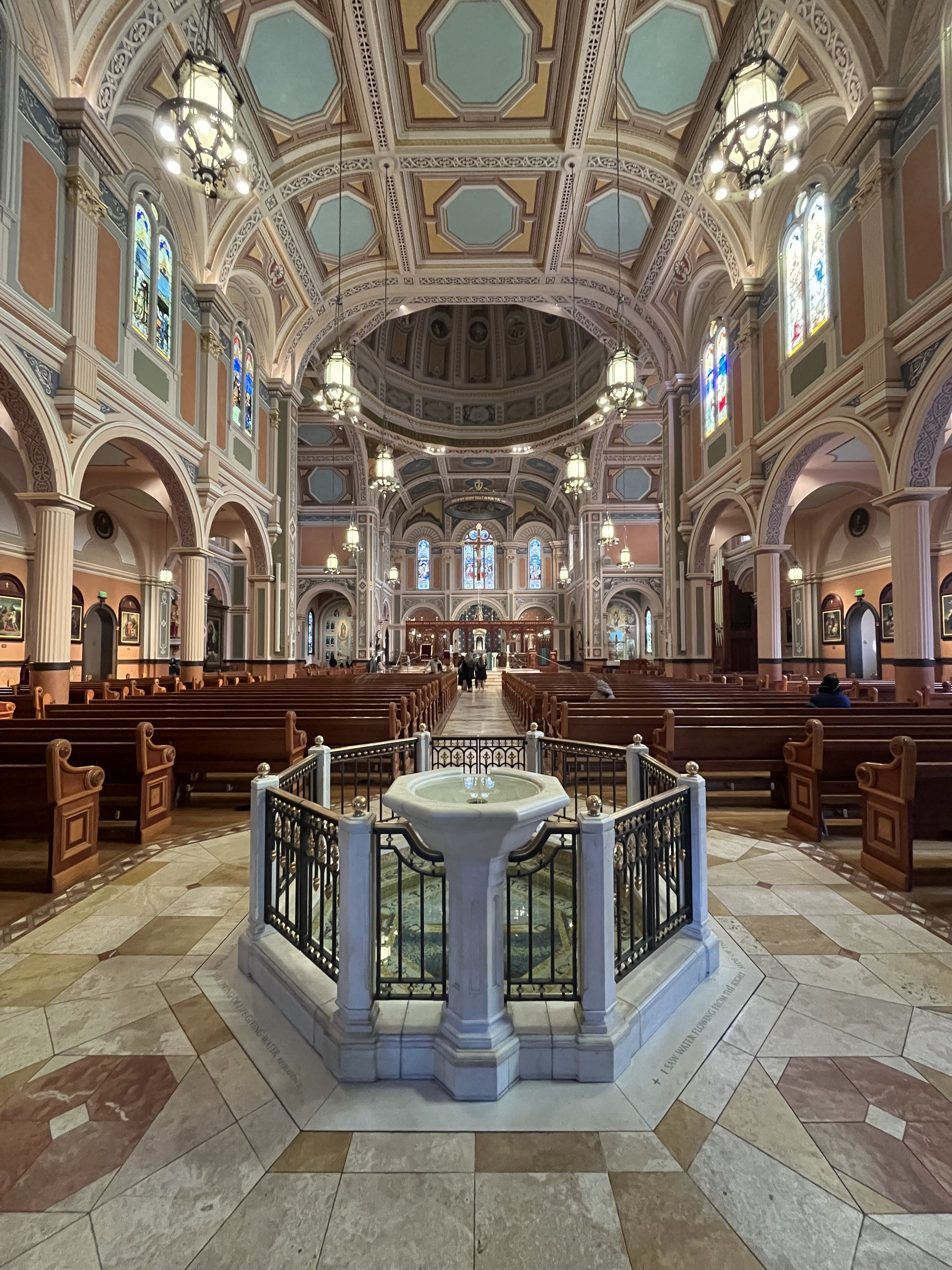
Baptismal font and nave in 2025

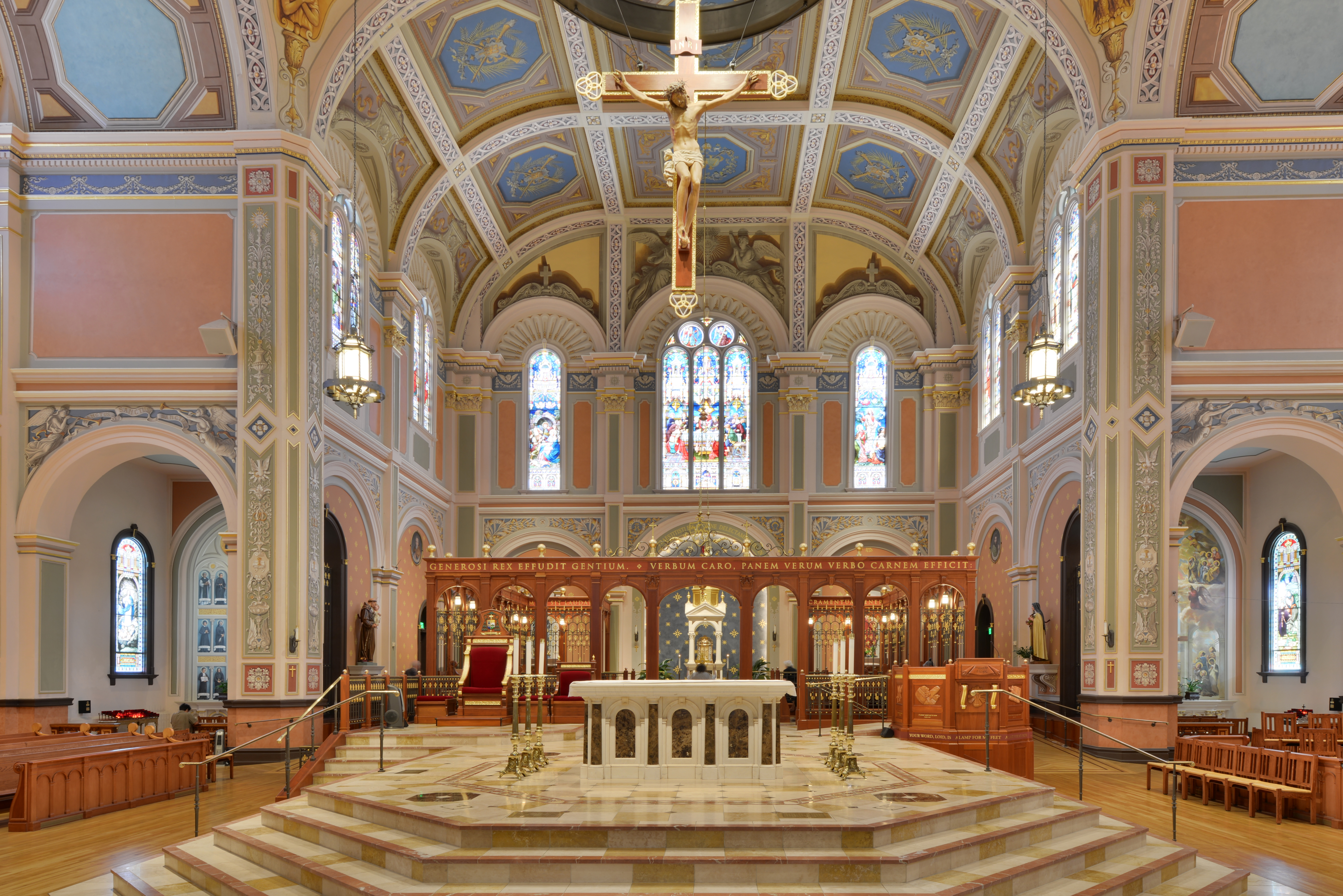
View towards the apse in 2013

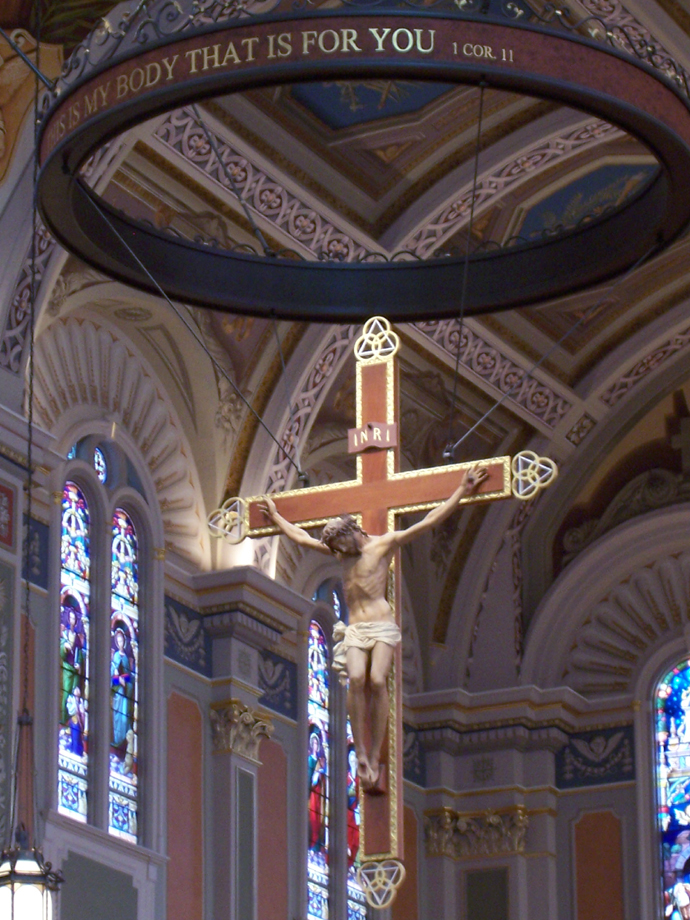
The new crucifix in 2005

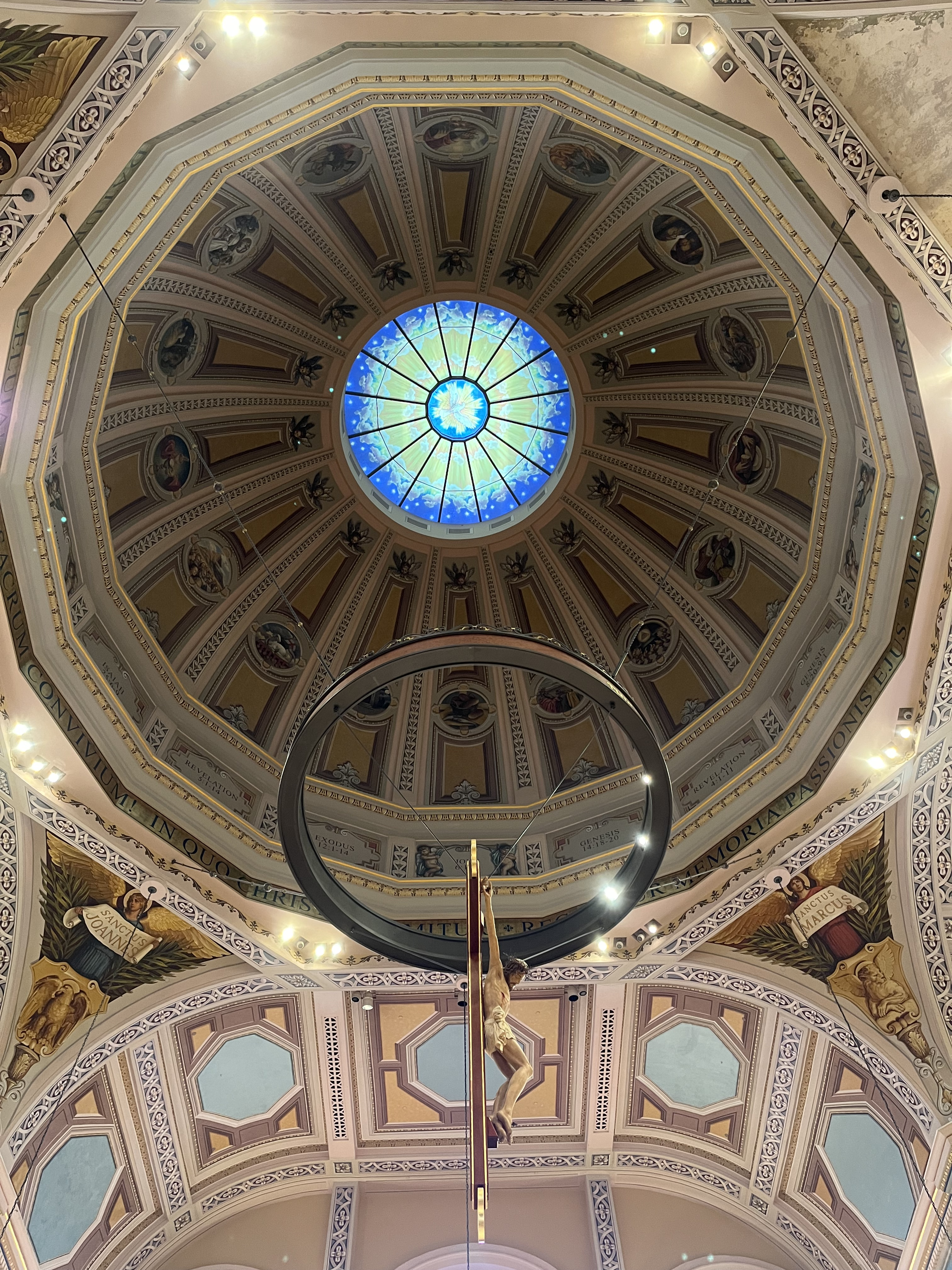
Dome and crucifix in 2025

== See also ==
- List of Catholic cathedrals in the United States
- List of cathedrals in the United States
- Sacramento Chinese Catholic Community
