= Diocese of Sacramento =

Diocese of the Catholic Church

Diocese of Sacramento Diœcesis Sacramentensis Diócesis de Sacramento
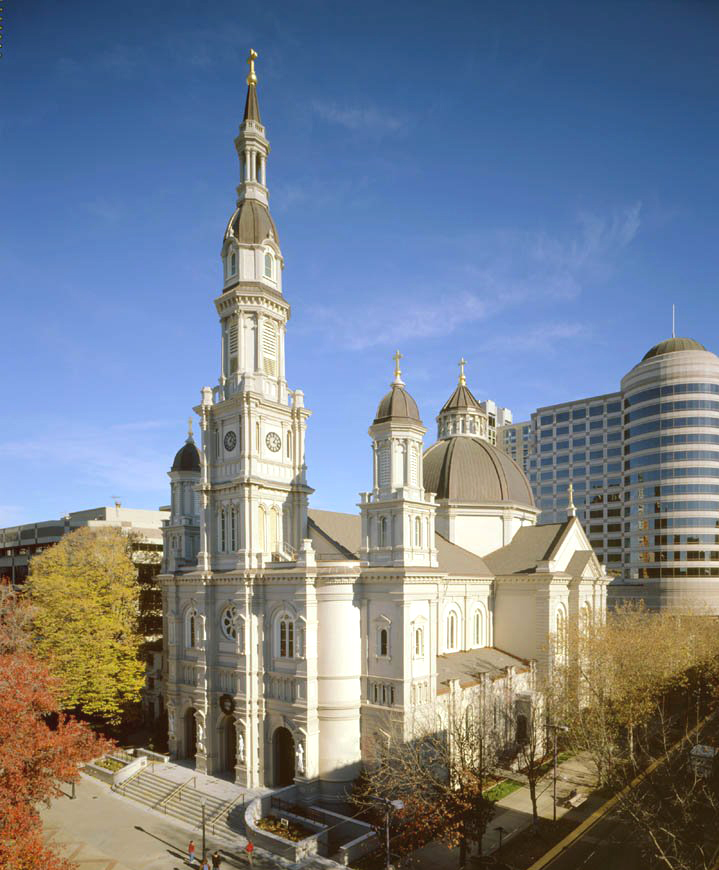
- Cathedral of the Blessed Sacrament

- Coat of arms

Location
- Country: United States
- Territory: Siskiyou, Modoc, Trinity, Shasta, Lassen, Tehama, Plumas, Glenn, Butte, Sierra, Colusa, Sutter, Yuba, Nevada, Yolo, Placer, Solano, Sacramento, El Dorado, and Amador counties in Northern California
- Ecclesiastical province: San Francisco
- Coordinates: 38.5589°N 121.4857°W

Statistics
- Area: 110,325 km^{2} (42,597 sq mi)
- Population: Total; Catholics: (as of 2014); 3,550,864; 987,727 (27.8%)

Information
- Denomination: Catholic
- Sui iuris church: Latin Church
- Rite: Roman Rite
- Established: 1886
- Cathedral: Cathedral of the Blessed Sacrament
- Patron saint: Our Lady of Guadalupe, Saint Patrick

Current leadership
- Pope: Leo XIV
- Bishop: Jaime Soto
- Metropolitan Archbishop: Salvatore J. Cordileone
- Auxiliary Bishops: Reynaldo Bersabal
- Bishops emeritus: William Weigand

Map

Website
- scd.org

The Diocese of Sacramento (Latin: Diœcesis Sacramentensis) is a diocese of the Catholic Church in the northern California region of the United States. It is a suffragan diocese of the Archdiocese of San Francisco. The mother church is the Cathedral of the Blessed Sacrament in Sacramento. The bishop is Jaime Soto.

== Territory ==
The Diocese of Sacramento contains the counties: Siskiyou, Modoc, Trinity, Shasta, Lassen, Tehama, Plumas, Glenn, Butte, Sierra, Colusa, Sutter, Yuba, Nevada, Yolo, Placer, Solano, Sacramento, El Dorado, and Amador.

== History ==
=== 1850 to 1886 ===
The first Catholic Mass in Northern California was celebrated in 1850 by Peter Anderson in a private home in Sacramento. One of the attendees that day was California Governor Peter Burnett, who later donated to Anderson a property in Sacramento for a new church.

In 1860, the Vatican erected the Vicariate Apostolic of Marysville, with jurisdiction over all of Northern California and Western Nevada. Eight years later, the Vatican suppressed the vicariate and established the Diocese of Grass Valley in its place. The pope named Patrick Manogue as its bishop. The Catholic population, centered in mining towns and farming communities, would rise and fall as economic conditions changed in them.

=== 1886 to 1922 ===
Pope Leo XIII erected the Diocese of Sacramento in 1886, taking its territory from the Archdiocese of San Francisco and the Diocese of Grass Valley, which the Vatican suppressed. The new diocese covered the eastern section of Northern California (excluding the coastal counties) and Western Nevada. The pope named Manogue, then bishop of Grass Valley as the first bishop of Sacramento.

In 1887, Manogue laid the cornerstone for the Cathedral of the Blessed Sacrament in Sacramento. When it was dedicated in 1889, the cathedral was the largest church of any denomination west of the Mississippi River. Manogue died in 1895. Leo XIII in 1896 named Thomas Grace of Sacramento as his replacement as bishop.

Grace dedicated St. Patrick Church in Scotia and St. Joseph Church in Redding in 1905. In 1906, he received a property deed in Red Bluff to be used for a hospital run by the Sisters of Mercy. In 1919, Grace dedicated St. Gall Catholic Church in Gardnerville, Nevada. Grace helped launch the diocesan newspaper, The Catholic Herald, in 1908. He died in 1921.

=== 1922 to 1958 ===
In 1922, Pope Pius XI named Auxiliary Bishop Patrick Keane of Sacramento as the third bishop of Sacramento. During his six-year tenure, Keane was instrumental in the formation of the parochial school system. He also founded several new parishes and recruited new priests and vocations. Keane died in 1928.

The next bishop of Sacramento was Robert Armstrong of the Diocese of Spokane, appointed by Pope Pius XI in 1929. Armstrong institutionalized social work within the diocese and upgraded its school system. In 1931, Pius XI erected the Diocese of Reno, taking the Nevada counties away from the Diocese of Sacramento.

By 1957, the Diocese of Sacramento had a Catholic population of 209,281, a 255% increase over 1940. Armstrong established 28 new parishes during his tenure. Pope Pius XII named Auxiliary Bishop Joseph McGucken of the Archdiocese of Los Angeles as coadjutor bishop in 1955 to assist Armstrong. When Armstrong died in 1957 after 28 years as bishop, McGucken automatically succeeded him as bishop.

=== 1958 to 1980 ===
In his five years as bishop, McGucken authorized, built or approved for development nine parishes, three high schools, 33 new church buildings and one minor seminary. He became archbishop of San Francisco in 1962. Auxiliary Bishop Alden Bell of Los Angeles was the next bishop of Sacramento.

Bell was responsible for implementing the reforms from the Second Vatican Council in the diocese. Bell initiated a fund drive to ease costs, build new schools, expand religious education programs, and build a home for the elderly.

In 1962, the Vatican erected the Dioceses of Stockton and Santa Rosa, taking several counties from the Diocese of Sacramento. At the same time, the Vatican transferred Solano County from the Archdiocese of San Francisco to Sacramento. Four years later, the Vatican also moved Alpine County from Sacramento to Stockton.

=== 1980 to present ===
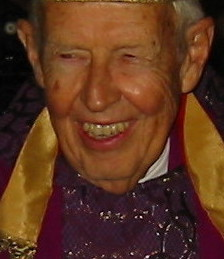
Bishop Quinn (2004)

When Bell retired in 1979, Pope John Paul II selected Auxiliary Bishop Francis Quinn of San Francisco as the next bishop of Sacramento. From 1980 to 1992, Quinn establish seven new parishes, several missions, two elementary schools, and one high school in the diocese. He oversaw a ten-year pastoral plan for the diocese as well as a spiritual renewal program, reorganized the deanery structure, initiated a diocesan pastoral council, and celebrated the hundredth anniversary of the diocese. In December 1991, after Sacramento police started investigating the priest Gerardo Beltran Rico on charges of sexual abuse of minors earlier that year, he fled to Mexico. A California arrest warrant for molesting two girls was issued in 1992. By 2023, 15 men and women had accused Rico of sexually abusing them when they were children. Quinn retired in 1993.

The next bishop of Sacramento was Bishop William Weigand of the Diocese of Salt Lake City, taking office in 1993. The diocese in 2005 agreed to pay a $35 million financial settlement to 33 clergy sex abuse victims. In 2007, Auxiliary Bishop Jaime Soto from the Diocese of Orange was made coadjutor bishop to assist Weigand. When Weigand retired in 2008, Soto became the next bishop. Hector Coria Gonzales was arrested in May 2014 on charges of statutory rape and oral copulation. Since 2013, he had been in a sexual relationship with a 16-year-old girl, who stated their relationship was consensual. He pleaded guilty to one count of sexual intercourse and was sentenced in August 2014 to 90 days in jail and three years of probation.

The diocese in 2016 removed Jeremy Leatherby from his parish position in Sacramento due to allegations of an intimate relationship with a female parishioner, suspending him from ministry. Leatherby continued to celebrate Mass and denied that Francis was the rightful pope. Leatherby was laicized at his own request in 2020. In April 2019, the diocese provided a list of 46 priests and deacons who were credibly accused of sexually abusing 130 minors and adults, ages 25 or younger, from 1950 to 2019. In February 2023, the diocese reported that over 200 lawsuits relating to sexual abuse, many of which were related to allegations against three priests. In December 2023, the diocese announced it would declare Chapter 11 bankruptcy protection by March 2024. The diocese officially filed for bankruptcy on April 1.

== Bishops ==
=== Bishops of Sacramento ===
1. Patrick Manogue (1886–1895)
2. Thomas Grace (1896–1921)
3. Patrick Joseph James Keane (1922–1928)
4. Robert John Armstrong (1929–1957)
5. Joseph Thomas McGucken (1957–1962), appointed Archbishop of San Francisco
6. Alden John Bell (1962–1980)
7. Francis Anthony Quinn (1979–1993)
8. William Keith Weigand (1993–2008)
9. Jaime Soto (2008–present)

=== Coadjutor bishops ===
- Joseph Thomas McGucken (1955-1957)
- Jaime Soto (2007-2008)

=== Auxiliary bishops ===
- Patrick Joseph James Keane (1920–1922), appointed Bishop of Sacramento
- John Stephen Cummins (1974–1977), appointed Bishop of Oakland
- Alphonse Gallegos (1981–1991)
- Richard John Garcia (1997–2006), appointed Bishop of Monterey in California
- Myron Joseph Cotta (2014–2018), appointed Bishop of Stockton
- Rey Bersabal (2024-present)

=== Other diocese priest who became bishop ===
- Richard Brendan Higgins, appointed auxiliary bishop of the US military in 2004

== Education ==
As of 2020, the Diocese of Sacramento had a school enrollment of approximately 13,000.

=== High schools ===
As of 2025, there are six high schools in the Diocese of Sacramento

- Chesterton Academy of Sacramento – North Highlands
- Christian Brothers High School – Sacramento
- Cristo Rey High School – Sacramento
- Jesuit High School – Carmichael
- St. Francis High School – Sacramento
- St. Patrick-St. Vincent High School – Vallejo

== Media ==
The Diocese of Sacramento owns Radio Santísimo Sacramento, which operates KCVV in Sacramento and KPYV in Oroville.
