= List of St. John's Seminary (California) people =

The list of St. John's Seminary (California) people is a compilation of lists of notable alumni, faculty, and current students of St. John's Seminary in Camarillo, California, United States. St. John's Seminary grants graduate degrees for seminarians preparing for the priesthood, as well as a graduate degree for lay persons interested in pastoral ministry. The St. John's Seminary College was the undergraduate division of the seminary before it closed in the early 21st century. The table of notable alumni lists the date of graduation from St. John's college, seminary, or both, if applicable. It is not unusual for seminarians to have received their undergraduate education at a different institution than their seminary training.

== Notable alumni ==
=== Notable seminarian alumni ===
Title	Name	Graduated from college	Graduated from seminary	Notes
Cardinal	Justin Francis Rigali		1961	Archbishop of Philadelphia
Cardinal	Roger Mahony	1958 B.A.	1962 S.T.B.	Archbishop of Los Angeles
Cardinal	William Levada	1958	—	Prefect of the Congregation of the Doctrine of the Faith
Archbishop	George Niederauer		1959	Archbishop of San Francisco
Bishop	Donald W. Montrose		1949	former Bishop of Stockton
Bishop	Tod David Brown	B.A.		Bishop of Orange
Bishop	Stephen Blaire		1967	Bishop of Stockton
Bishop	Jaime Soto	1978 B.A.	1982 M.Div.	Bishop of Sacramento
Bishop	Gabino Zavala		1977	Auxiliary bishop of Los Angeles
Bishop	Armando Xavier Ochoa		1970	Bishop of El Paso
Bishop	Gerald Eugene Wilkerson		1965	Auxiliary bishop of Los Angeles
Bishop	Edward W. Clark		1972	Auxiliary bishop of Los Angeles
Bishop	Dennis Patrick O'Neil		1966	Auxiliary bishop of San Bernardino
Bishop	Alexander Salazar		1984	Auxiliary bishop of Los Angeles
Bishop	Michael Patrick Driscoll		1965	Bishop of Boise
Bishop	Sylvester Donovan Ryan	1953 B.A.		former Bishop of Monterey
Bishop	John J. Ward		1946	former Auxiliary bishop of Los Angeles
Bishop	Joseph Martin Sartoris		1953	former Auxiliary bishop of Los Angeles
Rev.	Geoffrey Farrow	1981 B.A.	1985 M.Div.	priest relieved of his congregation after denouncing California Proposition 8 from the pulpit
Very Rev.	Cyprian Consiglio, O.S.B. Cam.		1998 M.A.	Prior of New Camaldoli Hermitage

== Notable faculty ==
- Timothy T. O'Donnell

=== Rectors ===
There have been 15 rectors of St. John's Seminary since its opening in 1939 and several presidents of the College during its time of operation (1961-2002). The seminary was originally administered by the Vincentian Fathers (C.M.), but has been operated by the Archdiocese since 1987.

St. John's Seminary
Name	Began	Ended
Rev. William P. Barr, C.M.	1939	1947
Rev. Francis Koeper, C.M.	1948	1954
Rev. James Richardson, C.M.	1954	1958
Rev. William Kenneally, C.M.	1958	1967
Rev. John Danagher, C.M.	1968	1973
Rev. John Grindel, C.M.	1973	1978
Rev. Charles Miller, C.M.	1978	1987
Rev. Msgr. George Niederauer	June 1987	June 1992
Rev. Msgr. Gabino Zavala	July 1, 1992	March 19, 1994
Rev. Msgr. Jeremiah J. McCarthy	May 31, 1994	2001
Rev. Msgr. Helmut Hefner	June 10, 2001	2007
Rev. Msgr. Craig A. Cox	July 1, 2007	June 30, 2014
Rev. Msgr. Mark V. Trudeau	July 1, 2014	June 7, 2018
Rev. Marco A. Durazo	July 1, 2018	June 30, 2025
Very Rev. Leon Hutton	July 1, 2025	—

St. John's Seminary College
Name	Began	Ended
Rev. Stafford Poole, C.M.	1980	1984
Rev. Sylvester Donovan Ryan	1986	1990
	1990	1994
Rev. Edward W. Clark	1994	2002
