= Slawomir Szkredka =

American Catholic prelate (born 1974)

His Excellency, The Most Reverend Sławomir Szkredka SSD
- Auxiliary Bishop of Los Angeles
- Church: Catholic
- Archdiocese: Los Angeles
- Appointed: July 18, 2023
- Installed: September 26, 2023
- Other posts: Titular Bishop of Vicus Turris; Professor, St. John's Seminary

Orders
- Ordination: January 12, 2002 by Roger Mahony
- Consecration: September 26, 2023 by José Horacio Gómez, Gerald Eugene Wilkerson, and Alejandro Dumbrigue Aclan

Personal details
- Born: May 12, 1974 (age 52) Czechowice-Dziedzice, Poland
- Education: Metropolitan Seminary; SS. Cyril and Methodius Seminary; Pontifical Biblical Institute
- Motto: Quodcumque Dixerit Facite (Whatever He tells you, do)
- Styles
- Reference style: His Excellency; The Most Reverend
- Spoken style: Your Excellency
- Religious style: Bishop

Sławomir Stanisław Szkredka (born May 12, 1974) is a Polish American Catholic prelate and biblical scholar currently serving as an auxiliary bishop of the Archdiocese of Los Angeles.

== Biography ==
=== Early life ===
Szkredka was born on May 12, 1974, in Czechowice-Dziedzice, Poland. He knew that he wanted to be a priest from an early age, and began studies at the Metropolitan Seminary in Kraków, Poland, following high school. Szkredka eventually transferred to SS. Cyril and Methodius Seminary, earning a Bachelor of Arts degree in philosophy and a Master of Theology degree in 2002.

=== Priesthood ===
Szkredka was ordained a priest for the Archdiocese of Los Angeles at St. Mel Parish in Woodland Hills, California, by Cardinal Roger Mahony on January 12, 2002.

Following his ordination, Szkredka served as parochial vicar at St. Genevieve Parish in Panorama City and at St. John the Baptist Parish in Baldwin Park. In 2008, he went to Rome to begin graduate studies at the Pontifical Biblical Institute. He earned his Doctor of Sacred Scripture degree in 2015 and returned to Los Angeles to serve as a professor and formator at St. John's Seminary in Camarillo, California.

=== Episcopacy ===
On July 18, 2023, Pope Francis appointed Szkredka as an auxiliary bishop of Los Angeles and the titular bishop of Vicus Turris. Archbishop José Gómez consecrated Szkredka as a bishop on September 26, 2023, at the Cathedral of Our Lady of the Angels, with Bishop Gerald Wilkerson and Auxiliary Bishop Alejandro Dumbrigue Aclan serving as co-consecrators.

On September 19, 2025, through Christophe Pierre, Apostolic Nuncio to the United States, it was announced that Szkredka was appointed apostolic administrator of the Diocese of Monterey.

Szkredka has published academic papers and a book titled Icon of Trust: Mary in the Gospels of Luke and John.

== See also ==
- Catholic Church hierarchy
- Catholic Church in the United States
- Historical list of the Catholic bishops of the United States
- List of Catholic bishops of the United States
- Lists of patriarchs, archbishops, and bishops

== Episcopal succession ==
Catholic Church titles
Preceded by -	Auxiliary Bishop of Los Angeles; 2023-Present	Succeeded by -
