= Marc Vincent Trudeau =

American priest of the Catholic Church

His Excellency, The Most Reverend Marc Vincent Trudeau
- Auxiliary Bishop of Los Angeles; Titular Bishop of Tinisa di Proconsolare
- Archdiocese: Los Angeles
- Appointed: April 5, 2018
- Installed: June 7, 2018
- Other post: Titular Bishop of Tinisa di Proconsolare

Orders
- Ordination: August 6, 1991 by Roger Mahony
- Consecration: June 7, 2018 by José Horacio Gómez, Roger Mahony, and Joseph Martin Sartoris

Personal details
- Born: May 20, 1957 (age 69) Hollywood, California, US
- Education: University of Southern California; St. John's Seminary
- Motto: Put out into deep water
- Styles
- Reference style: His Excellency; The Most Reverend
- Spoken style: Your Excellency
- Religious style: Bishop

Marc Vincent Trudeau (born May 20, 1957) is an American Catholic prelate who has served as an auxiliary bishop for the Archdiocese of Los Angeles since 2018.

== Biography ==
=== Early life ===
Marc Trudeau was born on May 20, 1957, in Hollywood, California, to Paul and Belva Trudeau. Paul was a naturalized American citizen of French-Canadian descent and Belva came from Illinois. Marc Trudeau attended primary school and high school in Burbank, California, then entered the University of Southern California (USC) in Los Angeles in 1981. After graduating in 1985 with a Bachelor of Science in biological sciences, Trudeau continued with dental school at USC.

After a short period practicing dentistry, Trudeau decided to become a priest. He entered St. John's Seminary in Camarillo, California, in 1986, studying philosophy and theology until 1991.

=== Priesthood ===
On August 6, 1991, Trudeau was ordained to the priesthood at St. Vibiana Cathedral in Los Angeles by Archbishop Roger Mahony for the Archdiocese of Los Angeles.

After his ordination, the archdiocese assigned Trudeau as parochial vicar at St. James the Less Parish in La Crescenta, California. He was transferred to St. Philip the Apostle Parish in Pasadena, California, in 1995 to serve as parochial vicar and temporary administrator. Trudeau was named pastor of St. Pius X Parish in Santa Fe Springs, California, in 2001.

In 2004, Mahony named Trudeau as his priest secretary, ending his tenure at St. Pius. He served in this position for the next six years. In 2008, Trudeau was diagnosed with lymphoma; he underwent radiation therapy and chemotherapy for the next three years. Pope Benedict XVI elevated Trudeau in 2007 to the rank of chaplain of his holiness. In 2010, the archdiocese named Trudeau as pastor of St. Margaret Mary Alacoque Parish in Lomita, California. He left St. Margaret Mary in 2013 to serve as vice rector and assistant director of pastoral formation at St. John's Seminary. He was named rector of St. John's in 2014.

=== Auxiliary Bishop of Los Angeles ===
Pope Francis appointed Trudeau as an auxiliary bishop of Los Angeles and titular bishop of Tinisa di Proconsolare on April 5, 2018. On June 7, 2018, he was consecrated at the Cathedral of Our Lady of the Angels in Los Angeles by Archbishop José Horacio Gómez, with Mahony and Bishop Joseph Martin Sartoris serving as co-consecrators.

== See also ==
- Catholic Church hierarchy
- Catholic Church in the United States
- Historical list of the Catholic bishops of the United States
- List of Catholic bishops of the United States
- Lists of patriarchs, archbishops, and bishops

Catholic Church titles
Preceded by -	Auxiliary Bishop of Los Angeles; 2018-Present	Succeeded by -
