= Juan Alfredo Arzube =

His Excellency, The Most Reverend Juan Alfredo Azrube
- Auxiliary Bishop of Los Angeles; Titular Bishop of Civitate
- Church: Catholic
- Archdiocese: Los Angeles
- Other post: Titular Bishop of Civitate

Orders
- Ordination: May 5, 1954 by Andrew Eugene Bellisario
- Consecration: March 25, 1971 by Timothy Manning

Personal details
- Born: June 1, 1918 Guayaquil, Ecuador
- Died: December 27, 2007 (aged 89) West Los Angeles, California, US
- Education: Rensselaer Polytechnic Institute; St. John's Seminary

Juan Alfredo Arzube (June 1, 1918 – December 27, 2007) was an Ecuadorian-born prelate of the Roman Catholic Church in the United States. He served as an auxiliary bishop of the Archdiocese of Los Angeles in California from 1971 to 1993.

In 2007, the archdiocese settled a sexual abuse allegation against Arzube.

== Early life ==
Juan Arzube was born on June 1, 1918, in Guayaquil, Ecuador to Dr. Juan B. and Maria Arzube. The younger Juan spent time in the United Kingdom before his family moved back to Ecuador. He completed high school and college there, then attended Rensselaer Polytechnic Institute in Troy, New York. After receiving a degree in civil engineering, Arzube moved back to Ecuador to work in his field.

Arzube moved to Los Angeles in 1944 to work in the film industry, dubbing American films into Spanish. He dubbed the voice of actor Peter Lorre in some films as well as that of the Fox character in the 1946 Disney film Song of the South. After attending a Catholic retreat in Malibu, California, Arzube decided to become a priest. He entered the St. John's Seminary in Camarillo, California.

== Priesthood ==
Arzube was ordained a priest for the Archdiocese of Los Angeles on May 5, 1954 by Archbishop Andrew Eugene Bellisario. Between 1954 and 1988, Arzube served as an assistant pastor at the following parishes in Southern California:

- St. Agnes, Los Angeles
- Resurrection, Los Angeles
- Ascension, Los Angeles
- Nativity, El Monte

== Auxiliary Bishop of Los Angeles ==
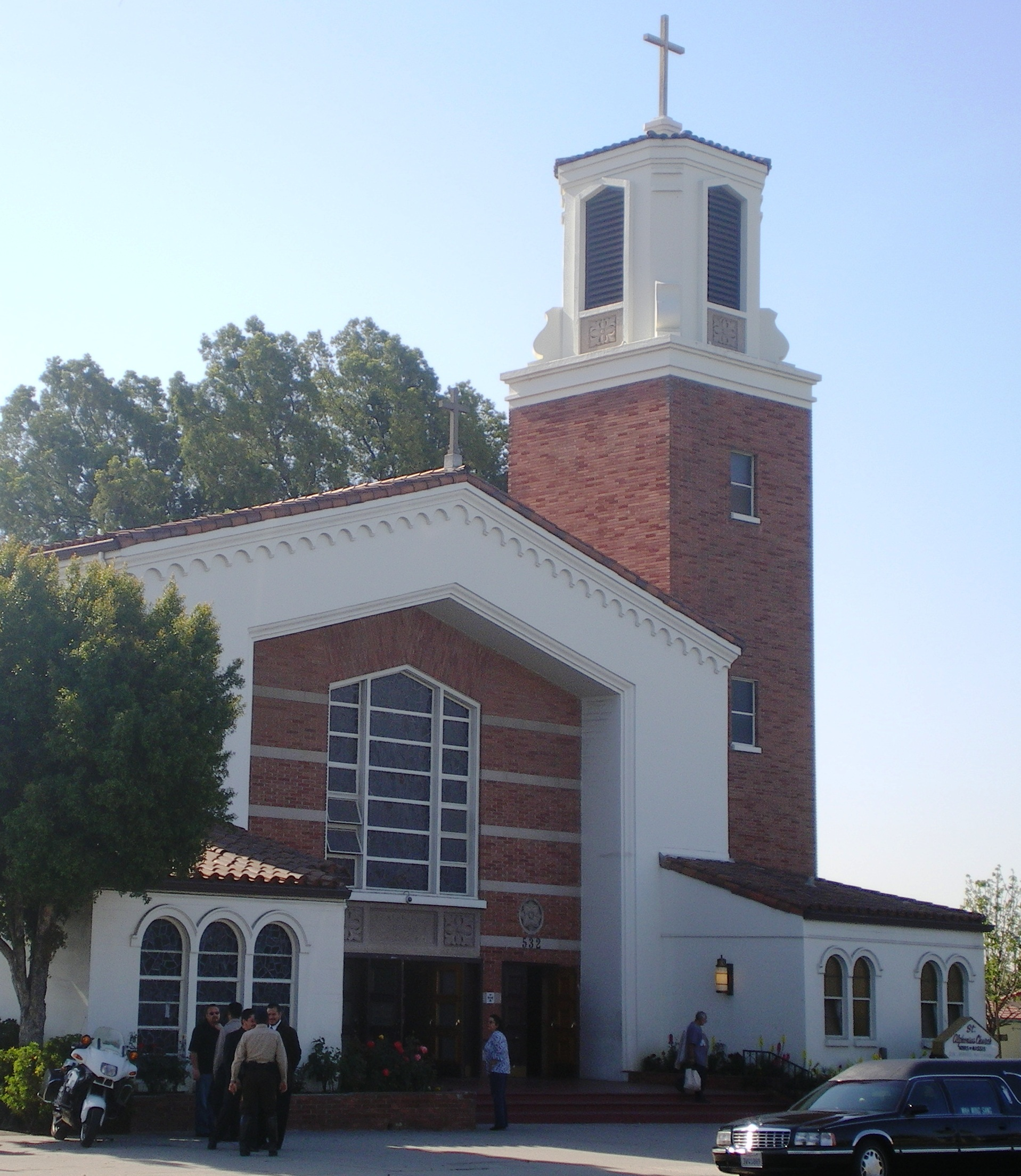
St. Alphonsus Church, Los Angeles, California (2007)

On February 9, 1971, Arzube was appointed titular bishop of Civitate and auxiliary bishop of Los Angeles by Pope Paul VI. Arzube was consecrated on March 25, 1971 at Cathedral Chapel of St. Vibiana in Los Angeles by Cardinal Timothy F. Manning.

Arzube in 1980 lobbied the archdiocese to reinstate a priest who had been suspended after a second allegation of sexually abusing a minor. He stated “How many priests are there completely guiltless over a period of 10 years?” Arzube was also appointed as pastor of St. Alphonsus Parish in East Los Angeles. In 1986, he became the head of the San Gabriel Pastoral Region of the archdiocese. He was also named as the episcopal vicar for the Hispanic community.

== Retirement and legacy ==
Arzube retired as auxiliary bishop of Los Angeles on September 7, 1993.

In 2003, a man alleged that Arzube had sexually abused him as an 11-year-old boy between 1975 to 1976 at St. Alphonsus. In a legal deposition, Arzube denied the allegation. He died in West Los Angeles on December 27, 2007. In 2007 as part of a massive settlement with survivors of child sexual abuse, the archdiocese settled a civil lawsuit naming Arzube.
