= Brian Nunes =

American Roman Catholic bishop (born 1964)

His Excellency, The Most Reverend Brian Nunes
- Auxiliary Bishop of Los Angeles
- Church: Catholic
- Archdiocese: Los Angeles
- Appointed: July 18, 2023
- Other post: Titular Bishop of Kearney

Orders
- Ordination: May 31, 2008 by Roger Mahony
- Consecration: September 26, 2023 by José Horacio Gómez, Gerald Eugene Wilkerson, and Alejandro Dumbrigue Aclan

Personal details
- Born: October 26, 1964 (age 62) Inglewood, California
- Education: Servite High School; Loyola Marymount University; St. John's Seminary
- Motto: In mundum universum praedicate evangelium (Preach the gospel to the whole world)
- Styles
- Reference style: His Excellency; The Most Reverend
- Spoken style: Your Excellency
- Religious style: Bishop

Brian Alan Nunes (born October 26, 1964) is a priest of the Catholic Church who has been serving as an auxiliary bishop for the Archdiocese of Los Angeles in California since 2023.

== Biography ==
=== Early life ===
Brian Nunes was born on October 26, 1964, in Inglewood, California, the oldest of four children born to immigrant parents from Hong Kong and Macau of Portuguese heritage. He attended elementary school at St. Joseph School in Placentia, California, and Servite High School in Anaheim, California. He then entered Loyola Marymount University in Los Angeles, earning a Bachelor of Arts in communications in 1986.

Nunes then worked in print journalism for a number of years, including 12 years at Business Wire, where he transitioned into technical support and network administration. Finding this work unsatisfying, he decided to become a priest. Nunes then entered St. John's Seminary in Camarillo, California, earning a Bachelor of Arts degree in philosophy and a Master of Divinity in 2008.

=== Priesthood ===
Nunes was ordained a priest by Archbishop Roger Mahony on May 31, 2008, for the Archdiocese of Los Angeles at the Cathedral of Our Lady of the Angels in Los Angeles. After his 2008 ordination, the archdiocese assigned Nunes as a parochial vicar and administrator of Mary Star of the Sea Parish in Los Angeles. From 2015 to 2019, he served as the priest-secretary of Archbishop José Gómez. In 2020, Gomez appointed him as vicar general and moderator of the curia of the archdiocese.

=== Auxiliary Bishop of Los Angeles ===
On July 18, 2023, Pope Francis appointed Nunes as an auxiliary bishop of Los Angeles and the titular bishop of Kearney. Gómez consecrated Nunes as a bishop on September 26, 2023, at the Cathedral of Our Lady of the Angels, with Bishop Gerald Wilkerson and Auxiliary Bishop Alejandro Aclan as co-consecrators.

== See also ==
- Catholic Church hierarchy
- Catholic Church in the United States
- Historical list of the Catholic bishops of the United States
- List of Catholic bishops of the United States
- Lists of patriarchs, archbishops, and bishops

== Episcopal succession ==
Catholic Church titles
Preceded by -	Auxiliary Bishop of Los Angeles; 2023-Present	Succeeded by -
