= Matthew Elshoff =

American bishop (b. 1955)

His Excellency, The Most Reverend Matthew Elshoff O.F.M. Cap.
- Auxiliary Bishop of Los Angeles; Titular Bishop of Lamzella
- Church: Catholic
- Archdiocese: Los Angeles
- Appointed: July 18, 2023
- Installed: September 26, 2023
- Other post: Titular Bishop of Lamzella
- Previous posts: President, St. Francis High School; Provincial Minister, Order of Friars Minor, Capuchin, Our Lady of the Angels Province

Orders
- Ordination: June 18, 1982 by Timothy Manning
- Consecration: September 26, 2023 by José Horacio Gómez, Gerald Eugene Wilkerson, and Alejandro Dumbrigue Aclan

Personal details
- Born: Matthew Gregory Elshoff; September 24, 1955 (age 71) Cincinnati, Ohio, US
- Parents: Calvin and Irene (née Molnar) Elshoff
- Education: St. Francis High School; Dominican School of Philosophy and Theology
- Motto: Caritas Christi urget nos (The love of Christ impels us)
- Styles
- Reference style: His Excellency; The Most Reverend
- Spoken style: Your Excellency
- Religious style: Bishop

Matthew Gregory Elshoff, O.F.M. Cap. (born September 24, 1955) is an American Catholic prelate who served as an auxiliary bishop for the Archdiocese of Los Angeles since 2023. He is a member of the Capuchin Franciscans.

== Biography ==
=== Early life ===
Matthew Elshoff was born on September 24, 1955, in Cincinnati, Ohio, as the first of five children of Calvin and Irene (née Molnar) Elshoff. His family moved to Los Angeles when he was a child, and he attended St. Bede the Venerable Church and Elementary School in La Cañada, Flintridge. The school was operated by the Sisters of St. Louis, who encouraged Elshoff to consider becoming a priest. Elshoff then attended St. Francis High School in La Cañada Flintridge, California, which was operated by the Order of Friars Minor Capuchin.

Having decided to enter the priesthood, Elshoff joined the Capuchins in 1979. He entered their seminary at the Dominicans' St. Albert the Great Priory in Oakland, California, professing solemn vows on September 22, 1979. He continued his studies at the Dominican School of Philosophy and Theology in Berkeley, graduating in 1982 with degrees in theology and divinity.

=== Priesthood ===
Elshoff was ordained a priest by Cardinal Timothy Manning for the Capuchin Order on June 18, 1982, at St. Bede the Venerable Church in La Canada. After his 1982 ordination, the Capuchins assigned Elshoff as vocations director for his Capuchin province. After six year in this position, he spent a sabbatical year in Benito Juarez, Mexico, working as a missionary.

Returning to California, Elshoff then served as a teacher, chaplain, counselor, and president at St. Francis High School. During this time, he also earned a master's degree and license in marriage and family therapy in 1986 and 1990. He also served as the provincial minister for his province of Capuchins as well as novice master.

Elshoff received his first pastoral assignment in 2015 when the Capuchins sent him to serve as pastor at Old Mission Santa Inés Parish in Solvang, California. He was transferred in 2018 to become pastor at St. Lawrence of Brindisi Parish in the Watts neighborhood of Los Angeles. During the peak of the COVID-19 pandemic, when churches were closed, he walked through the neighborhood with a cross and a monstrance carrying the Eucharist.

=== Episcopacy ===
On July 18, 2023, Pope Francis appointed Elshoff as an auxiliary bishop of Los Angeles and the titular bishop of Lamzella. Archbishop José Gómez consecrated him as a bishop on September 26, 2023, at the Cathedral of Our Lady of the Angels in Los Angeles, with Auxiliary Bishops Gerald Wilkerson and Alejandro Aclan serving as co-consecrators.

== See also ==
- Catholic Church hierarchy
- Catholic Church in the United States
- Historical list of the Catholic bishops of the United States
- List of Catholic bishops of the United States
- Lists of patriarchs, archbishops, and bishops

== Episcopal succession ==
Catholic Church titles
Preceded by –	Auxiliary Bishop of Los Angeles; 2023–present	Succeeded by –
