= Albert Bahhuth =

Roman Catholic bishop

His Excellency, The Most Reverend Albert Bahhuth
- Auxiliary Bishop of Los Angeles; Titular Bishop of Vadesi
- Church: Catholic
- Archdiocese: Los Angeles
- Appointed: July 18, 2023
- Installed: September 26, 2023
- Other posts: Titular Bishop of Vadesi; Vicar General, Archdiocese of Los Angeles; Moderator of the Curia, Archdiocese of Los Angeles

Orders
- Ordination: June 1, 1996 by Roger Mahony
- Consecration: September 26, 2023 by José Horacio Gómez, Gerald Eugene Wilkerson, and Alejandro Dumbrigue Aclan

Personal details
- Born: Albert Matta Bahhuth; October 6, 1956 (age 70) Beirut, Lebanon
- Education: University of Missouri at Rolla; University of Mississippi; St. John's Seminary
- Motto: Go make disciples
- Styles
- Reference style: His Excellency; The Most Reverend
- Spoken style: Your Excellency
- Religious style: Bishop

Albert Matta Bahhuth (born October 6, 1956) is a Lebanese-born prelate of the Catholic Church who has served as an auxiliary bishop for the Archdiocese of Los Angeles in California since 2023.

== Biography ==
=== Early life ===
Albert Bahhuth was born in Beirut, Lebanon, on October 6, 1956, as the youngest of seven children. While he was baptized and received his other sacraments in the Melkite Greek Catholic Church, his family was not very religious. According to Bahhuth, he grew up in "more in a Protestant environment than a Catholic one", due in part to attending a Baptist-run school.

The Lebanese Civil War began in 1975 when Bahhuth was 19 years old. He described in 2023 how the conflict affected him:

"My family lived in East Beirut, which was mostly Christian, and I went to school in West Beirut, which was mostly Muslim. It was dangerous crossing through the city, as you could be killed for being the wrong religion".

The war eventually interrupted Bahhuth's university studies, prompting him to leave Lebanon. Bahhuth first attended the University of Missouri at Rolla in Rolla, Missouri, where he receive a Bachelor of Science in chemical engineering.

He then entered the University of Mississippi in Oxford, Mississippi and was first awarded a Master of Science degree and then a Ph.D. in the same field. At this time, a friend of Bahhuth's suggested he go to church, which he had not done since childhood.

Unable to find a job in his field, Bahhuth briefly taught engineering at the University of Wyoming in Laramie, Wyoming. He moved to Southern California in 1984 and worked in the retail and fast-food industries, operating two franchised Subway locations.

He began to attend mass at St. John Vianney church in Hacienda Heights. Bahhuth eventually took a year off from his business to work with a lay missionary group at Ascension Church in South Los Angeles.

Having decided in 1991 to become a priest, Bahhuth entered St. John's Seminary in Camarillo, California. He officially transferred to the Latin Church in November 1993.

=== Priesthood ===
Bahhuth was ordained a priest for the Archdiocese of Los Angeles on June 1, 1996, at St. Joseph the Worker Church in Canoga Park, California, by Cardinal Roger Mahony.

After his 1996 ordination, the archdiocese assigned Bahhuth as parochial vicar at St. Gregory the Great Parish in Whittier, California. In 2002, he was assigned as pastor at St. Finbar Parish in Burbank, California, where he remained for the next 11 years. Bahhuth was transferred in 2013 as pastor at St. Kateri Tekakwitha Parish in Santa Clarita, California.

Archbishop José Gómez in 2015 named Bahhuth as vicar general and moderator of the curia. The Vatican in 2017 elevated him to chaplain of his holiness with the title of monsignor. In 2021, Bahhuth was appointed pastor of Holy Family Parish in South Pasadena, California.

=== Auxiliary Bishop of Los Angeles ===
On July 18, 2023, Pope Francis appointed Bahhuth as an auxiliary bishop of Los Angeles and the titular bishop of Vadesi. Gómez consecrated Bahhuth as a bishop on September 26, 2023, at the Cathedral of Our Lady of the Angels, with Bishop Gerald Eugene Wilkerson and Auxiliary Bishop Alejandro Aclan serving as co-consecrators.

Gómez appointed Bahhuth as episcopal vicar for the San Fernando Pastoral Region on September 26, 2023. He also serves on the board of trustees of St. John's Seminary.

== See also ==
- Catholic Church hierarchy
- Catholic Church in the United States
- Historical list of the Catholic bishops of the United States
- List of Catholic bishops of the United States
- Lists of patriarchs, archbishops, and bishops

== Episcopal succession ==
Catholic Church titles
Preceded by –	Auxiliary Bishop of Los Angeles; 2023–present	Succeeded by –
