= Gabino Zavala =

Mexican-American Catholic prelate (born 1951)

His Excellency, The Most Reverend Gabino Zavala
- Auxiliary Bishop Emeritus of Los Angeles
- See: Archdiocese of Los Angeles
- Appointed: February 8, 1994
- Installed: March 19, 1994
- Retired: January 4, 2012

Orders
- Ordination: May 28, 1977 by Cardinal Timothy Manning
- Consecration: March 19, 1994 by Cardinal Roger Mahony, John Ward, and Armando Xavier Ochoa

Personal details
- Born: September 7, 1951 (age 75) Guerrero, Mexico
- Education: St. John's Seminary College; Catholic University of America

Styles of Gabino Zavala
- Reference style: His Excellency; The Most Reverend
- Spoken style: Your Excellency
- Religious style: Bishop

Gabino Zavala (born September 7, 1951) is a Mexican-American Catholic prelate who served as an auxiliary bishop for the Archdiocese of Los Angeles in California from 1994 until 2012. He resigned at the request of Pope Benedict XVI after admitting he was the father of two children.

== Biography ==
=== Early life ===
Born September 7, 1951, in Guerrero, Mexico, Gabino Zavala and his family moved to Tijuana, Mexico, when he was a child. He survived a fire in his family's apartment that killed two of his brothers. The family then moved to East Los Angeles, California. In 1969, Zavala entered St. John's Seminary College in Camarillo, California.

=== Priesthood ===
Zavala was ordained a priest for the Archdiocese of Los Angeles at St. Vibiana's Cathedral in Los Angeles on May 28, 1977, by Cardinal Timothy Manning. After his ordination, Zavala served as an associate pastor of Our Lady of Guadalupe Parish in East Los Angeles and as associate director of the marriage tribunal for the archdiocese.

After earning a Licentiate of Canon Law from the School of Canon Law at the Catholic University of America in Washington, D.C., Zavala became a professor of canon law and the rector of St. John's Seminary.

=== Auxiliary Bishop of Los Angeles ===
Pope John Paul II appointed Zavala as auxiliary bishop of Los Angeles and titular bishop of Tamascani on February 8, 1994, He received his episcopal consecration from Cardinal Roger Mahony on March 19, 1994.

Zavala served as the episcopal vicar of the San Gabriel Pastoral Region until his resignation. Zavala promoted restorative justice, opposed the death penalty, and was a long-time supporter of immigration reform. Although he was sometimes considered orthodox in his beliefs, he had a long history of supporting controversial positions on LGBTQ+ rights.

Zavala was the bishop president of the U.S. section of Pax Christi, co-president of Interfaith Worker Justice, and the episcopal advisor to the International Commission of Catholic Prison Pastoral Care (ICCPPC). He was also an adjunct professor of canon law and pastoral theology at Loyola Marymount University in Los Angeles. In 2000, Zavala organized Encuentro, a conference of Catholics from different backgrounds and cultures. Encuentro had over 5,000 attendees, including 40 bishops and Cardinal Bernard Law.

Zavala was honored in 2004 by the group Death Penalty Focus. He got involved in prison ministry and would bring parishioners on visits to local prisons. In May 2011, Zavala was recognized as a 'giant of justice' by Clergy & Laity United for Economic Justice (CLUE) . In June 2011, he wrote an editorial for the National Catholic Reporter about an “unprecedented assault on workers’ rights now spreading across the country".

=== Resignation and legacy ===
On January 4, 2012, Archbishop José Gómez announced that Pope Benedict XVI had accepted Zavala's resignation as auxiliary bishop of Los Angeles. In December 2011, Zavala disclosed to Gómez that he was the father of two teenage children. The pope accepted Zavala's resignation under Code of Canon Law c. 401 §2. In his announcement, Gómez stated that Zavala had not been in ministry since the revelation, and that he "will be living privately".

Gómez also said that the unidentified children were minors living with their mother in another state, and that the archdiocese would assist them with college costs. Though not specified, the Los Angeles Times revealed that Zavala's relationship with the children's mother was "more than a passing relationship."

== See also ==
- Catholic Church hierarchy
- Catholic Church in the United States
- Historical list of the Catholic bishops of the United States
- List of Catholic bishops of the United States
- Lists of patriarchs, archbishops, and bishops

== Episcopal succession ==
Catholic Church titles
Preceded by -	Auxiliary Bishop of Los Angeles; 1994-2012	Succeeded by -
