= Thomas John Curry =

Irish-born American prelate of the Roman Catholic Church

His Excellency, The Most Reverend Thomas John Curry
- Auxiliary Bishop Emeritus of Los Angeles
- See: Archdiocese of Los Angeles
- Appointed: February 8, 1994
- Installed: March 19, 1994
- Retired: April 3, 2018

Orders
- Ordination: June 17, 1967 by John Joseph Scanlan
- Consecration: March 19, 1994 by Roger Mahony, John Ward, and Armando Xavier Ochoa

Personal details
- Born: January 17, 1943 (age 83) Drumgoon, County Cavan, Ireland
- Education: University College Dublin; Loyola Marymount University

Styles of Thomas John Curry
- Reference style: His Excellency; The Most Reverend
- Spoken style: Your Excellency
- Religious style: Bishop

Thomas John Curry (born January 17, 1943) is an Irish-born American prelate of the Roman Catholic Church. Curry served as an auxiliary bishop of the Archdiocese of Los Angeles in California from 1994 to 2018. From 1994 to 2013, he was episcopal vicar of the Santa Barbara Pastoral Region of the archdiocese.

Curry was forced to resign in 2013 as vicar due to his role in attempting to maintain the secrecy of sexual abuse allegations against priests in the archdiocese.

== Biography ==
=== Early life ===
Thomas Curry was born on January 17, 1943, in Drumgoon in County Cavan, in the Republic of Ireland. He attended University College Dublin, graduating in 1963 with a bachelor's degree in history.

=== Priesthood ===
On June 17, 1967, Curry was ordained to the priesthood by Bishop John Scanlan in Ireland at All Hallows College for the Archdiocese of Los Angeles. After his ordination in 1967, Curry moved to the United States, where he started serving as an associate pastor at St. Bernardine of Siena Parish in Woodland Hills, California.

In 1970, Curry started teaching at Pius X High School in Downey, California. During this time, Curry studied at Loyola Marymount University in Los Angeles, receiving a Master of History degree in 1973.

In 1976, Curry was appointed director of the archdiocese Office of Continuing Education for Clergy. In 1978, he was a teacher for one year at St. Paul High School in Santa Fe Springs, California. He received a doctorate in history in 1983 from Claremont Graduate University in Claremont, California. In 1985, Curry was appointed as vicar for clergy.

In 1987, Curry wrote a memo to Cardinal Roger Mahony discussing how to keep secret acts of sexual abuse by priests, saying that they constituted privileged information. The memo mentioned Michael Wempe, a priest in Ventura County, California, who was accused of "some sexual touching". Wempe later admitted to abusing 13 boys.

The Vatican named Curry as chaplain to his holiness in 1984 and prelate of honor in 1988. In 1991, he was named director of the Secretariat for Church Ministerial Services.

=== Auxiliary Bishop of Los Angeles ===
On February 8, 1994, Curry was appointed as titular bishop of Ceanannus Mór and as an auxiliary bishop of Los Angeles by Pope John Paul II. Curry was consecrated on March 19, 1994, by Mahony; his principal co-consecrators were Bishops James Ward and Armando Ochoa.

Within the United States Conference of Catholic Bishops (USCCB), Curry served as chairman of the Committee for Catholic Education and consultant to The Bishops' Committee on the Liturgy. In 2000, he signed up for the USCCB's Encuentro 2000.

In 2001, Curry wrote the book Farewell to Christendom: The Future of Church and State in America. In the book, Curry defined Christendom as "the system dating from the fourth century by which governments upheld and promoted Christianity". He stated that the end of Christendom came about because modern governments refused to "uphold the teachings, customs, ethos, and practice of Christianity". Curry argued that the First Amendment to the United States Constitution and the Second Vatican Council's Declaration on Religious Freedom were two of the most important documents setting the stage for the end of Christendom.

On January 23, 2013, the archdiocese released 3,000 pages of church personnel files, as required by a legal settlement of a lawsuit in 2007. The files showed that Curry had repeatedly worked to suppress the public release of information on archdiocesan priests accused of sexual assault. Curry released a statement of apology the day after the files were released.

On February 1, 2013, Archbishop José Gómez announced Curry's resignation as head of the Santa Barbara pastoral region. This was in response to Curry's role in aiding Cardinal Mahony in attempting to maintain the secrecy of records on abusive priests in the archdiocese.

=== Retirement ===
In January 2018, Curry turned age 75 and submitted his resignation as auxiliary bishop to the Vatican, according to the procedures in canon law. On April 3, 2018, Pope Francis accepted his resignation.

== See also ==
- Catholic Church hierarchy
- Catholic Church in the United States
- Historical list of the Catholic bishops of the United States
- List of Catholic bishops of the United States
- Lists of patriarchs, archbishops, and bishops
