= Joseph Martin Sartoris =

American Roman Catholic prelate (1927–2025)

His Excellency, The Most Reverend Joseph Martin Sartoris
- Auxiliary Bishop Emeritus of Los Angeles
- See: Los Angeles
- Appointed: February 8, 1994
- Installed: March 19, 1994
- Retired: December 31, 2002
- Other post: Titular Bishop of Oliva (1994–2025)

Orders
- Ordination: May 30, 1953 by James Francis McIntyre
- Consecration: March 19, 1994 by Roger Mahony, John Ward, and Armando Xavier Ochoa

Personal details
- Born: July 1, 1927 Los Angeles, California, U.S.
- Died: June 27, 2025 (aged 97) Los Angeles, California, U.S.
- Education: St. John's Seminary

Styles of Joseph Martin Sartoris
- Reference style: His Excellency; The Most Reverend
- Spoken style: Your Excellency
- Religious style: Bishop

Joseph Martin Sartoris (July 1, 1927 – June 27, 2025) was an American Catholic prelate who served as an auxiliary bishop for the Archdiocese of Los Angeles in California from 1994 to 2002.

== Biography ==
=== Early life ===
Sartoris was born in Los Angeles, California on July 1, 1927. He studied at St. John's Seminary in Camarillo, California.

=== Priesthood ===
On May 30, 1953, Sartoris was ordained into the priesthood by Cardinal James McIntyre for the Archdiocese of Los Angeles. After his ordination, Sartoris was assigned as an associate pastor to several parishes. He then served as a teacher and assistant principal at Bishop Conaty High School in Los Angeles for several years. Sartoris then returned to parish ministry while also serving as administrator pro tempore at Dolores Mission parish and administrator at Nativity Parish, both in Los Angeles.

Sartoris' first assignment as pastor was at St. Madeleine Parish in Pomona, California. In 1978, he was named pastor of St. Margaret Mary Parish in Lomita, California. He remained at St. Margaret as pastor until his appointment as auxiliary bishop for the San Pedro Region in 1994.

=== Auxiliary Bishop of Los Angeles ===
On February 8, 1994, Pope John Paul II appointed Sartoris as the titular bishop of Oliva and as an auxiliary bishop of Los Angeles. He was consecrated a bishop by Cardinal Roger Mahony on March 19,1994 (the Feast of Saint Joseph) at the Cathedral of Saint Vibiana in Los Angeles. Sartoris led the archdiocese's San Pedro Pastoral Region from 1994 to 2002. On December 31, 2002, John Paul II accepted Sartoris' letter of resignation as he had reached the mandatory retirement age of 75.

=== Death ===
Sartoris died June 27, 2025, at the age of 97.

== See also ==
- Catholic Church hierarchy
- Catholic Church in the United States
- Historical list of the Catholic bishops of the United States
- List of Catholic bishops of the United States
- Lists of patriarchs, archbishops, and bishops

== Episcopal succession ==
Catholic Church titles
Preceded by Carl A. Fisher	Auxiliary Bishop of Los Angeles; 1994–2002	Succeeded by Marc V. Trudeau
Preceded by Frank Marcus Fernando	Titular Bishop of Olivia; 1994–2025	Succeeded by Vacant
