= Geoff Farrow =

American Roman Catholic priest

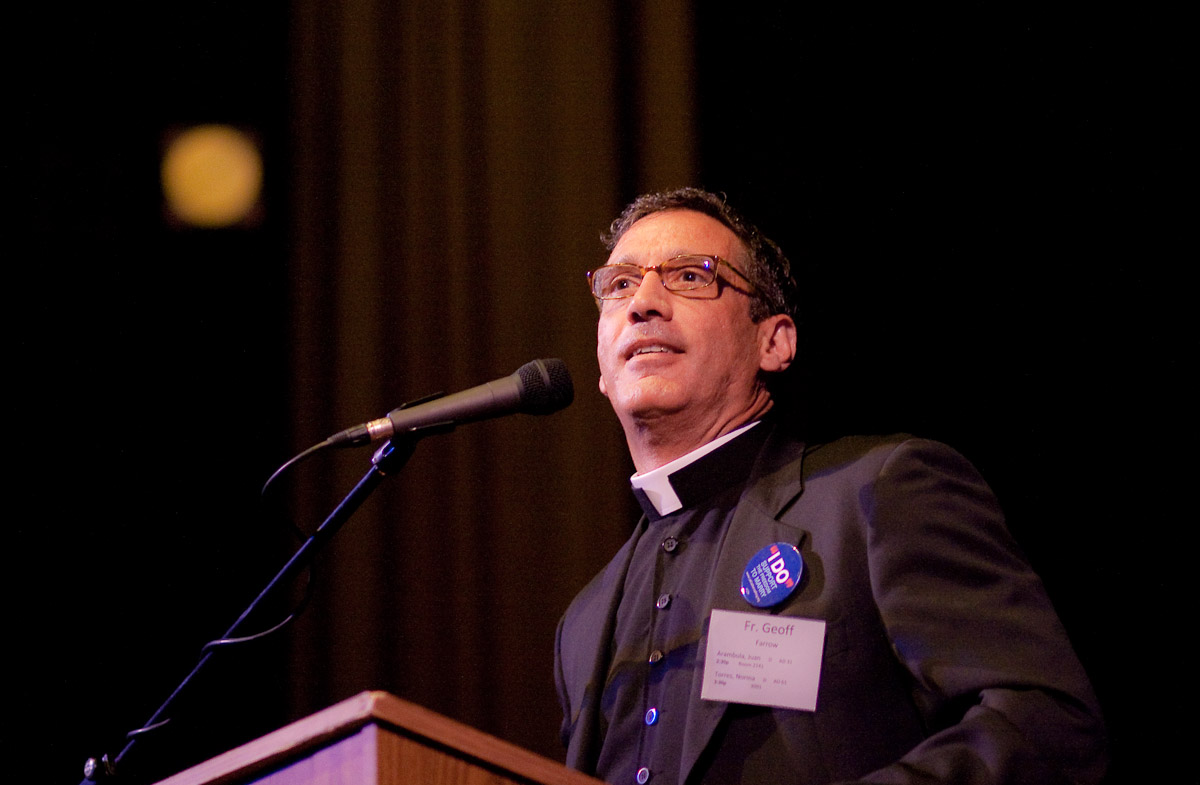
Farrow speaking in February 2009

Geoffrey Farrow, a Roman Catholic priest and pastor of St. Paul's Newman Center in Fresno, California, delivered a pulpit statement at the end of the 11:00 AM Mass on October 5, 2008, in support for the right of same-sex couples to enter into civil marriage in the State of California.

Subsequently relieved of his duties and suspended as a priest and removed as pastor of St. Paul's by his bishop for making this public statement, he also stripped of his salary, retirement benefits, and health insurance and was also forbidden from visiting parishes at which he had served or publishing on the Internet. Farrow continued to engage in public speaking to advance the cause of LGBT rights.

== Background ==
Farrow was born in Cuba and grew up in Illinois and Florida. He earned a B.A. in philosophy from St. John's College in 1981 and a Masters in Divinity in 1985 from St. John's Seminary in Camarillo, California. He served as an Officer/Chaplain in the U. S. Air Force Reserves and was awarded the National Defense Service Medal. He was stationed at Edwards Air Force Base.

== Subsequent events ==
On November 17, 2008, the city of West Hollywood, California commended Farrow for his fight for equal rights.

On June 22, 2009, the California State Assembly commended Farrow for his generous and tireless work in the LGBT community and beyond.

Farrow and 12 other activists protested the U.S. military policy known as "don't ask, don't tell" by handcuffing themselves to the White House fence on November 15, 2010. Farrow explained his motives for this act of civil disobedience in an article published in the Huffington Post.

Farrow was a board member of GetEqual, an organization dedicated to LGBT rights.
