= Alexander Salazar =

Catholic bishop

His Excellency, The Most Reverend Alejandro Salazar
- Auxiliary Bishop Emeritus of Los Angeles
- See: Archdiocese of Los Angeles
- Appointed: September 7, 2004
- Installed: November 4, 2004
- Retired: December 19, 2018

Orders
- Ordination: June 16, 1984 by Timothy Manning
- Consecration: November 4, 2004 by Roger Mahony, Gabino Zavala, and Gustavo García-Siller

Personal details
- Born: November 28, 1949 (age 76) San José, Costa Rica
- Education: East Los Angeles College; California State University, Los Angeles; St. John's Seminary
- Motto: Do what Jesus tells you

Styles of Alejandro Salazar
- Reference style: His Excellency; The Most Reverend
- Spoken style: Your Excellency
- Religious style: Bishop

Alejandro Salazar (born November 28, 1949) is a Costa Rican-born American prelate of the Roman Catholic Church. Salazar served as an auxiliary bishop of the Archdiocese of Los Angeles from 2004 to 2018.

Salazar resigned as auxiliary bishop of Los Angeles in 2018 after a sexual misconduct charge against him was deemed credible by the archdiocese and the Vatican. In August 2023, Salazar was convicted of two sexual abuse felonies following a no contest plea.

== Biography ==
=== Early life ===
Alejandro Salazar was born on November 28, 1949, in San José, Costa Rica, but moved with his family to Los Angeles in 1953. He attended Daniel Murphy High School in Los Angeles, then entered East Los Angeles College in Monterey Park, California.

Salazar then attended California State University, Los Angeles and Immaculate Heart College in Los Angeles, obtaining a Bachelor of Arts degree in bilingual studies in 1978. From 1968 to 1979, Salazar taught at St. Albert the Great School in Compton, California. In 1977, Salazar entered St. John's Seminary in Camarillo, California.

=== Priesthood ===
Salazar was ordained to the priesthood for the Archdiocese of Los Angeles by Cardinal Timothy Manning on June 16, 1984. After his ordination, Salazar served as associate pastor at the following parishes in Southern California:

- St. Gregory the Great in Whittier
- Assumption of the Blessed Virgin Mary in Pasadena
- Cathedral of St. Vibiana in Los Angeles

In 1995, Salazar was appointed pastor of St. Teresa of Avila Parish in Silverlake, California, assigned there until 2004. He also served as dean of Deanery 14, and as a member of the Council of Priests, the college of Consultors, the Clergy Pension Board, and the Archdiocesan Personnel Board. In 2003, Salazar was named vice-chancellor of the archdiocese and the Vatican elevated him to the rank of honorary chaplain of his holiness.

=== Auxiliary Bishop of Los Angeles ===
On September 7, 2004, Pope John Paul II appointed Salazar as auxiliary bishop of Los Angeles and titular bishop of Nesqually. He was consecrated at the Cathedral of Our Lady of the Angels in Los Angeles on November 4, 2004, by Cardinal Roger Mahony, with Bishops Gabino Zavala and Gustavo Garcia-Siller serving as co-consecrators. Salazar selected as his episcopal motto: "Do What Jesus Tells You" (John 2:5).

According to a 2018 statement by Archbishop Jose H. Gomez, a person accused Salazar of sexual misconduct during the 1990s when Salazar was a parish priest in Pasadena. Salazar denied any wrongdoing. In 2002, the claimant reported their allegations to the Pasadena Police Department; after an investigation, the district attorney declined to press criminal charges against Salazar.

When Mahony learned about the accusations against Salazar in 2005, he submitted them to the Congregation for the Doctrine of the Faith in Rome while allowing Salazar to still perform ministry. The Congregation then "conducted an investigation and imposed certain precautionary measures on the ministry of Bishop Salazar" in 2005. Mahony also requested another review by the Pasadena district attorney, who again declined to indict Salazar.

After Gomez became archbishop in 2011, he submitted the Salazar case to the archdiocesan Clergy Misconduct Oversight Board. It recommended suspending Salazar from any ministerial functions. Gomez then forwarded these findings and his own recommendations on Salazar to Pope Francis.

=== Resignation and legacy ===
Pope Francis accepted Salazar's letter of resignation as auxiliary bishop of Los Angeles on December 19, 2018. It was submitted before the mandatory age 75 limit.

On August 21, 2023, Salazar pled no contest to two felony counts of PC288(a)-F Lewd or Lascivious Acts With Child Under 14 Years. Per the plea agreement, Salazar received a six-year prison sentence (suspended), five years of formal probation, required registration as a sex offender, and other sentencing requirements.

On August 6, 2024, Fox 11 Los Angeles reported that Salazar was residing in the rectory at Mary Magdalen Catholic Church in Los Angeles
