= Cyprian Consiglio =

American Benedictine monk and composer

The Rev. Cyprian Consiglio, O.S.B. Cam.
- Previous posts: Prior, New Camaldoli Hermitage (2013-2024)

Orders
- Ordination: July 1998 by Sylvester Donovan Ryan

Personal details
- Born: Phillip Daniel Consiglio; June 19, 1958 (age 68) Joliet, Illinois, United States
- Profession: Secretary General, Monastic Interreligious Dialogue
- Education: St. John Seminary

Cyprian Consiglio, O.S.B. Cam., (born June 19, 1958) is an American composer, Camaldolese monk and a Catholic priest. He is noted for his musical work to support the practice of meditation. He is the author of four books.

Consiglio serves as the Secretary General of the Monastic Interreligious Dialogue movement, run by the Benedictine and Cistercian Orders of the Catholic Church to promote dialogue with the monk and nuns of Eastern religions, primarily Buddhism.

== Life ==
He was born in 1958 as Phillip Daniel Consiglio and grew up near Joliet, Illinois. He later spent many years living in Phoenix, Arizona, where he worked as a professional musician, performer (guitarist and vocalist), arranger and producer. During his time in Phoenix, AZ, he also worked as a music teacher at St. Jerome's Catholic Elementary School and the connected Parish, while in the role of Liturgical Minister.

Consiglio began his recording career in his early twenties, and has since gone on to record numerous collections of original music in a wide variety of styles. Though much of his early work was in Catholic liturgical music, much of his latest work incorporates styles and sacred texts from a wide variety of cultures and spiritual traditions.

In 1992 Consiglio was admitted as a candidate of the Camaldolese Hermitage of the Immaculate Heart (better known as New Camaldoli) in Big Sur, California. In 1998 he earned a Master's degree in theology from St. John Seminary in Camarillo, California and was ordained a Catholic priest in July of that year. He has spent a considerable amount of time studying both Eastern and Western spirituality, particularly under the influence of Bede Griffiths. After his monastic formation and ten years living at New Camaldoli Hermitage, he re-located near Santa Cruz, California, and lived ten years in a hermitage where he spent about half of his time on the road performing concerts, and teaching or leading retreats mainly on the topic of the Universal Call to Contemplation. He made regular trips to India and other Asian countries, "learning and teaching." In the fall of 2012 he resumed living at New Camaldoli.

In July 2013 Consiglio was elected the prior of the hermitage after the previous prior, Robert Hale, O.S.B. Cam., informed the community that he was stepping down. Consiglio was installed as prior on July 20, 2013, and reconfirmed for another six-year term at the end of January 2018. He ended his term in January, 2024 and returned to his work in music, writing and interreligious dialogue.

== Partial discography ==
- Lord of Field and Vine (NALR/Epoch Universal, 1983) under name Daniel Consiglio
- There Is A Light (NALR, 1992) under name Daniel Consiglio
- Behind and Before Me (OCP, 1996)
- As One Unknown (OCP, 1998)
- In the Heart of the Desert w/ John Pennington (OCP, 1999)
- Awakening w/John Pennington (Equilibrium, 2002)
- Lord, Open My Lips (OCP, 2003)
- The Song of Luke (Equilibrium, 2004)
- Wait, My Soul, In Silence w/Laurence Freeman, O.S.B. (MedioMedia, 2005)
- Compassionate and Wise (Equilibrium, 2006)
- Echo of Your Peace (MedioMedia, 2008)
- My Soul's Companion (independent, 2010)
- ec*stasis (independent, 2012)
- The Circle Turns with Animas Ensemble (2022)

== Bibliography ==
- Consiglio, Cyprian (2010). Prayer in the Cave of the Heart: The Universal Call to Contemplation. Collegeville, Minnesota: The Liturgical Press. ISBN 9780814632765. OCLC 405106765.
- Consiglio, Cyprian (2015). Spirit, Soul, Body: Toward an Integral Christian Spirituality. Collegeville, Minnesota: The Liturgical Press. ISBN 9780814635575. OCLC 874223888.
- Consiglio, Cyprian (2020). The God Who Gave You Birth,. Collegeville, Minnesota: The Liturgical Press. ISBN 9780814632765. OCLC 405106765.
- Consiglio, Cyprian (2023). Rediscovering the Divine. Maryknoll, New York: Orbis Books. ISBN 9781626985070. OCLC 1362514926.
