= Archdiocese of Los Angeles =

Archdiocese in California

Coordinates: 34°03′39″N 118°17′54″W

Archdiocese of Los Angeles Archidiœcesis Angelorum in California Arquidiócesis de Los Ángeles Tổng Giáo phận Los Angeles
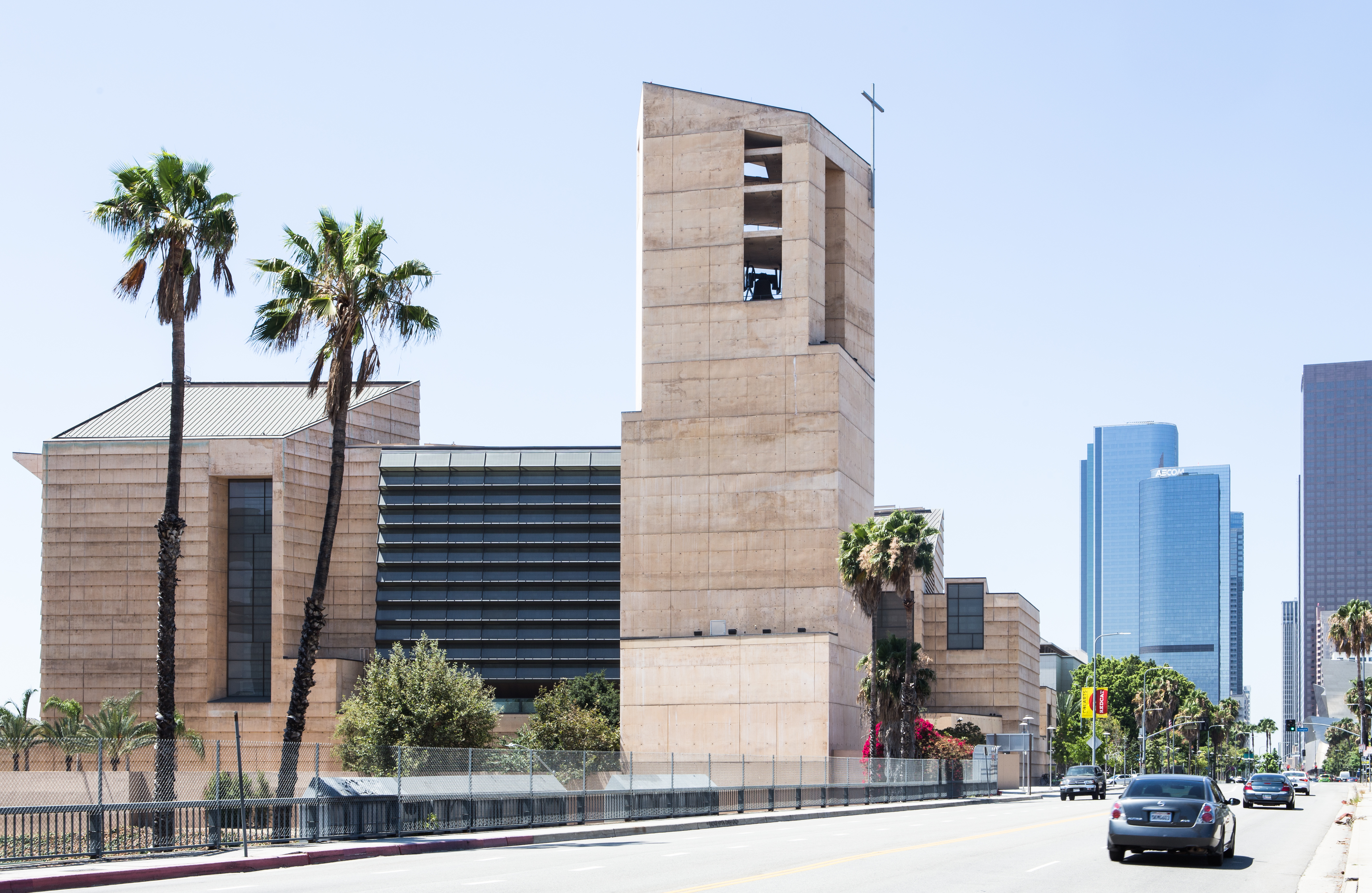
- Cathedral of Our Lady of the Angels

- Coat of arms

Location
- Country: United States
- Territory: Los Angeles, Santa Barbara, and Ventura Counties
- Ecclesiastical province: Los Angeles

Statistics
- Area: 14,019 km^{2} (5,413 sq mi)
- Population: Total; Catholics: (as of 2015); 11,599,000; 4,392,000 (37.9%)
- Parishes: 287

Information
- Denomination: Catholic
- Sui iuris church: Latin Church
- Rite: Roman Rite
- Established: June 1, 1922; 104 years ago (As Diocese of Los Angeles-San Diego); July 11, 1936; 90 years ago (As Archdiocese of Los Angeles)
- Cathedral: Cathedral of Our Lady of the Angels
- Patron saint: Saint Vibiana, Saint Patrick, Saint Rita, Saint Emidius
- Secular priests: 590

Current leadership
- Pope: Leo XIV
- Archbishop: José Horacio Gómez Velasco
- Auxiliary Bishops: Marc Vincent Trudeau; Albert Bahhuth; Matthew Elshoff; Brian Nunes; Slawomir Szkredka
- Vicar General: James M. Anguiano
- Judicial Vicar: Reynaldo Matunog
- Bishops emeritus: Roger Michael Cardinal Mahony; Edward W. Clark; Thomas John Curry; Gerald Eugene Wilkerson; Gabino Zavala; Alexander Salazar; Alejandro D. Aclan

Map
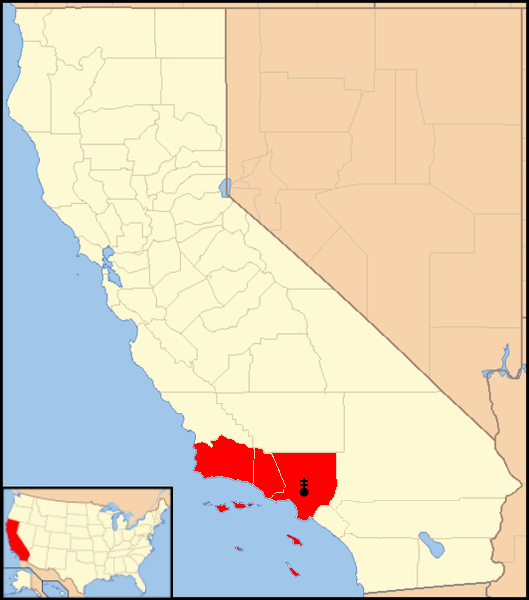

Website
- lacatholics.org

The Archdiocese of Los Angeles (Latin: Archidiœcesis Angelorum in California, Spanish: Arquidiócesis de Los Ángeles) is an archdiocese of the Catholic Church located in the southern part of California in the United States, The archdiocese contains the counties of Los Angeles, Santa Barbara, and Ventura. The cathedral is the Cathedral of Our Lady of the Angels in Los Angeles, and its present archbishop is José Horacio Gómez Velasco.

With over five million professing members and weekly liturgies celebrated in 32 languages, the Archdiocese of Los Angeles is numerically the single largest and most ethnically diverse archdiocese in the United States.

The archbishop of Los Angeles also serves as metropolitan bishop of the suffragan dioceses within the Ecclesiastical Province of Los Angeles, which includes the dioceses of Fresno, Monterey, Orange, San Bernardino, and San Diego.

Spanish Franciscan missionaries established Spanish missions in the region during the 18th century, but they were abandoned by 1834. The Vatican established the diocese of the Two Californias in 1840, when the Los Angeles region was still part of Mexico. In 1848, Mexican California was ceded to the United States, and the American portion of the diocese was renamed the Diocese of Monterey. The diocese was renamed the Diocese of Monterey-Los Angeles in 1859, and the episcopal see was moved to Los Angeles upon the completion of the Cathedral of Saint Vibiana in 1876. Los Angeles split from Monterey to become the Diocese of Los Angeles-San Diego in 1922. The diocese was split again in 1936 to create the Diocese of San Diego, and the Los Angeles was seen elevated to an archdiocese. The archdiocese's present territory was established in 1976, when Orange County was split off to establish the Diocese of Orange.

The sexual abuse scandal in the archdiocese resulted in a $880 million court settlement in 2024; bringing the total settlement payouts for the archdiocese to over $1.5 billion. Instances of sexual abuse within the archdiocese have been documented back to the 1930s, though instances from the 1970s through 1990s have been more highly publicized.

== History ==
=== 1500 to 1800 ===
The first Catholic presence in the present-day archdiocese was that of priests who accompanied the Spanish expedition of Juan Cabrillo in 1542 and Sebastian Vizcaíno in 1602. During the 18th century, the Spanish established a chain of 21 missions, operated by the Franciscan Order, in present-day California to solidify their territorial claims to the area.

The goal of the missions was to convert members of the Native American tribes in what was now the Spanish province of Alta California. Once they were baptised, these converts were forced to live at the missions, where worked in the fields and built the mission churches and other buildings. The missions soon controlled large blocks of land in the province and amassed great wealth.

The first of three missions in the archdiocese was the Mission San Buenaventura, founded in Ventura in 1749 by the missionary Junipero Serra to evangelize the Chumash people. It was followed in 1771 by the Mission San Gabriel Arcángel in San Gabriel, established by the missionaries Benito Cambon and Angel Somera for the Tongva people. This mission served as the base for the founding of Los Angeles.

The first parish church in Santa Barbara was Our Lady of Sorrows, established in 1782 to serve the Spanish soldiers stationed at the presidio, or fort, in that community. It was followed in 1789 by the third mission, Mission Santa Barbara, founded to evangelize the Chumash.

=== 1800 to 1848 ===
The first Catholic church in the City of Los Angeles was La Iglesia de Nuestra Señora la Reina de los Ángeles, founded in 1814 in what became the downtown of the city.

After the end of the Mexican War of Independence in 1822, control of Alta California passed from Spain to the new Mexican Empire. Mexico in 1834 passed a law that required all the missions to disgorge most of their property holdings and free the Native American converts from servitude. As a result, the Franciscans abandoned the missions, leaving them in disrepair.

In 1840, Pope Gregory XVI erect the Diocese of California. It was also called "Diocese of Two Californias" or "Diocese of Both Californias". Gregory XVI set the episcopal see in San Diego . The new diocese included the following Mexican territories:

- Alta California, encompassing the present American states of California, Nevada, Arizona and Utah, along with western Colorado and southwestern Wyoming
- Baja California Territory, encompassing the present Mexican states of Baja California and Baja California Sur

=== 1848 to 1900 ===
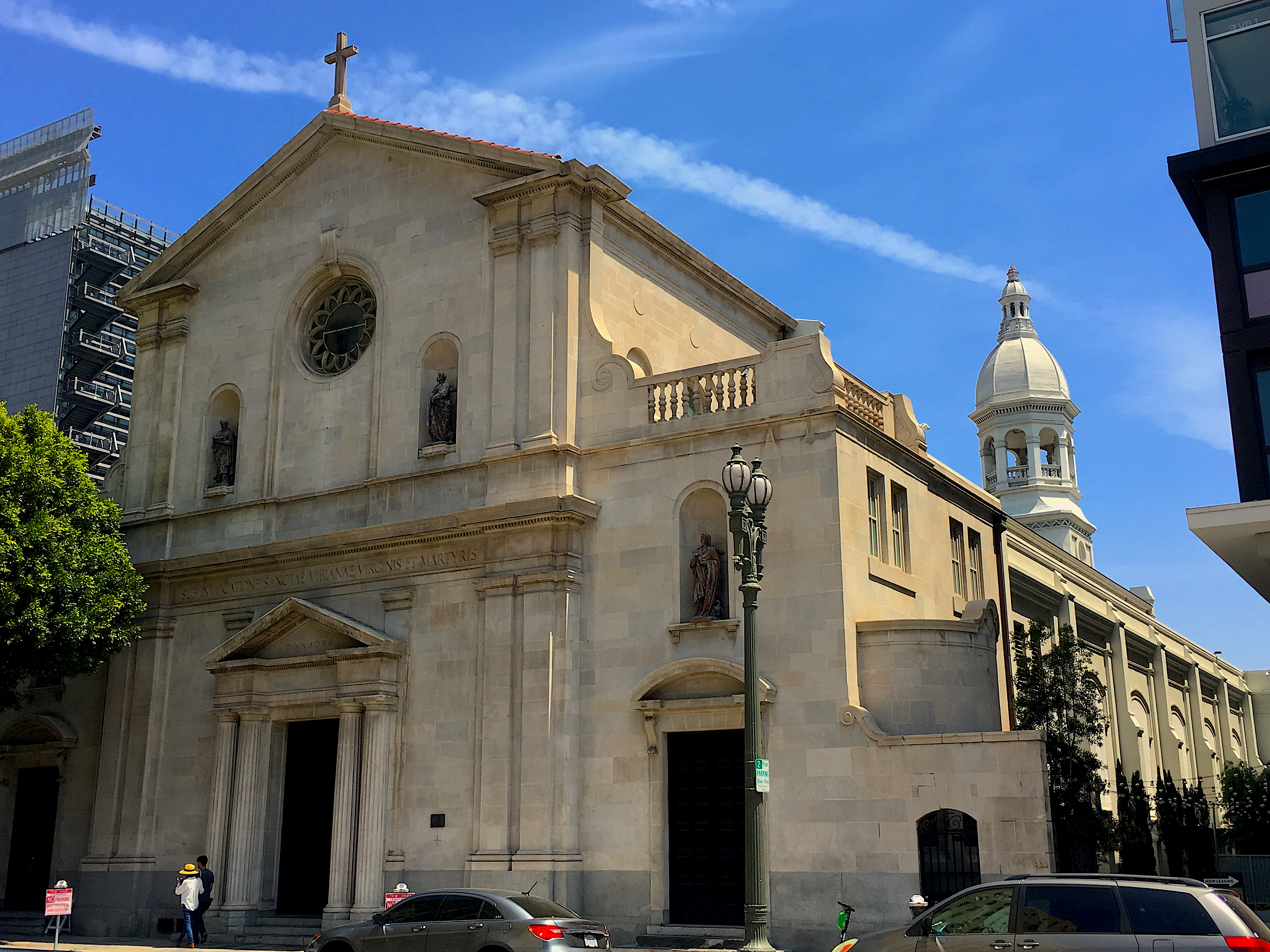
Saint Vibiana Church (formerly Cathedral of Saint Vibiana

After the conclusion of the Mexican American War in 1848, Mexico surrendered control of Alta California to the United States. Mexico then petitioned the Vatican to divide the Diocese of California into American and Mexican dioceses. On November 20, 1849, the American diocese became the Diocese of Monterey, with the episcopal see in Monterey, California. California gained statehood in 1850.

In 1853, Pope Pius IX erected the Archdiocese of San Francisco, taking Nevada, Utah, and much of Northern California from the Diocese of Monterey. In 1859, Pius IX renamed the Diocese of Monterey as the Diocese of Monterey-Los Angeles to recognize the growth of the city of Los Angeles. The bishop moved his principal residence to Los Angeles, with the Mission Santa Barbara serving as its pro-cathedral. In 1856, the Daughters of Charity opened the Los Angeles Infirmary, the first Catholic hospital in Los Angeles. It became the former St. Vincent Medical Center.

The Congregation of the Mission opened the St. Vincent's College for Boys in Los Angeles in 1865. It was the first institution of higher learning in Los Angeles. The Cathedral of Saint Vibiana was dedicated in Los Angeles in 1876. St. Monica Parish, erected in 1882 in Santa Monica, was the first parish in that city. St. Andrew's Catholic Parish was founded in Pasadena in 1886.

=== 1900 to 1948 ===
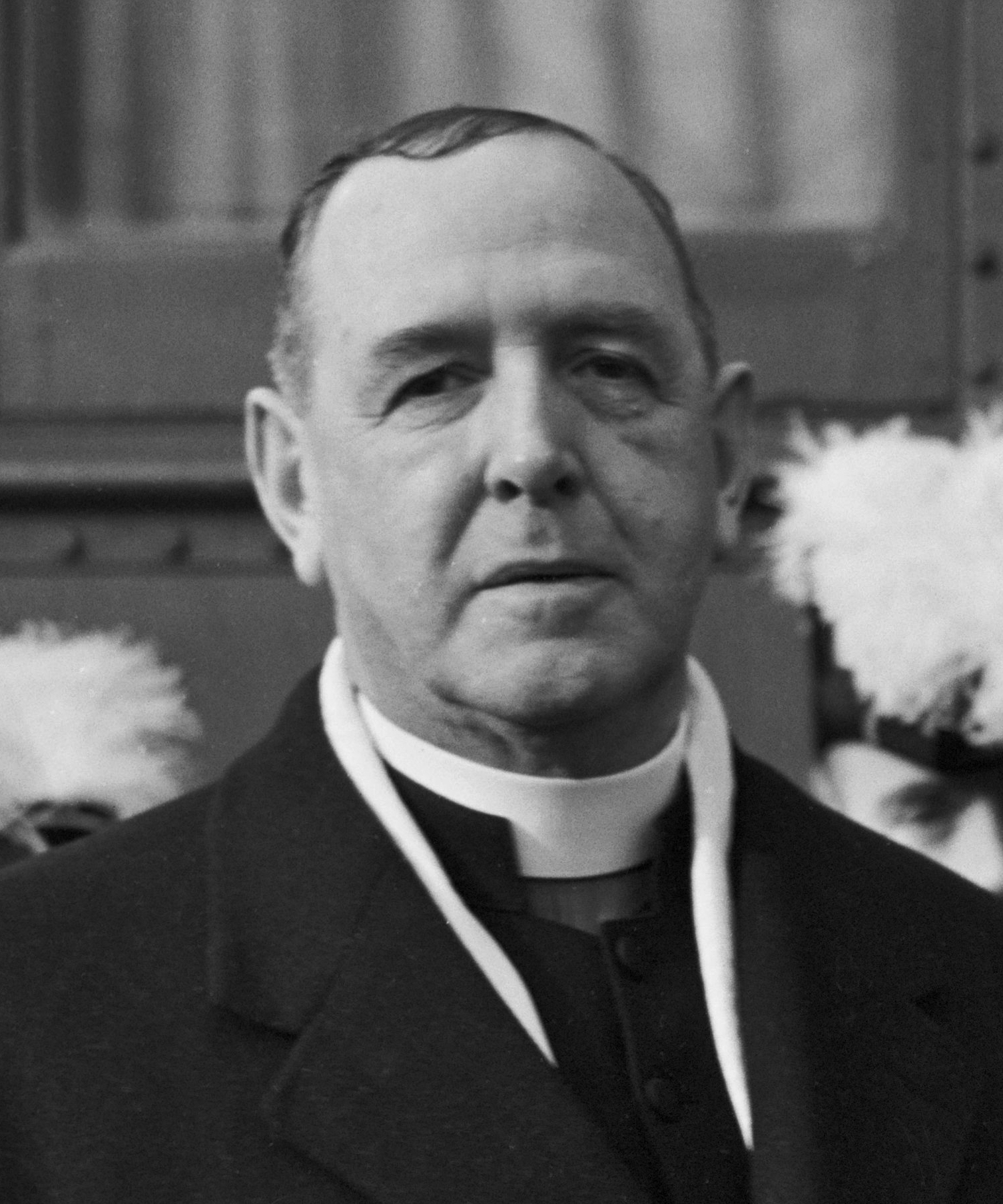
Archbishop Cantwell (1936)

In 1902, St. Anthony Parish was established in Long Beach. Blessed Sacrament Parish, which opened in Hollywood in 1904, came to serve many Catholics working in the film industry. In Burbank, St. Robert Bellarmine Parish was founded in 1907. That same year, the first parish in Glendale, Holy Family, opened. St. Vincent College closed in 1911, to be replaced by Loyola College in Los Angeles.

By 1917, the Diocese of Monterey-Los Angeles had a Catholic population of 180,000 with 276 priests serving in 128 parishes, 85 missions, and 93 stations. The diocese had 44 parochial schools with 9,000 students. On June 1, 1922, Pope Pius XI changed the Diocese of Monterey-Los Angeles to the Diocese of Los Angeles-San Diego, removing the counties in northern and central California. It now included Imperial, Los Angeles, Orange, Riverside, San Bernardino, San Diego, Santa Barbara, and Ventura Counties. In 1923, the Sisters of Charity of the Incarnate Word established St. Mary's Hospital in Long Beach. It is today part of Dignity Health.

In 1925, the Sisters of St. Joseph of Carondelet established Mount Saint Mary's University, the only university for women in Southern California. The Religious of the Sacred Heart of Mary opened Marymount Junior College in the Westwood area of Los Angeles in 1933. It later became Marymount College.

On July 11, 1936, Pius XI split the Diocese of Los Angeles-San Diego into the Archdiocese of Los Angeles and the Diocese of San Diego. The pope named Bishop John Joseph Cantwell of Los Angeles-San Diego as the first bishop of the new archdiocese. St. John's Hospital in Santa Monica was founded as a military hospital during World War II by the Sisters of Charity of Leavenworth: it is today Provident Saint John's Health Center.

Cantwell's tenure was a period of growth for the Catholic Church in Southern California. By the time of his death in 1947, the archdiocese had a Catholic population of 601,200 with 688 priests, 217 parishes, 44 missions, 20 stations, four Catholic colleges and universities with 2,350 total students, 35 Catholic high schools with 8,673 total students, and 115 Catholic elementary schools with 38,821 total students. Cantwell established Los Angeles College, a minor seminary, in 1927 and St. John's Seminary in Camarillo in 1938. Cantwell died in 1947.

=== 1948 to 1976 ===
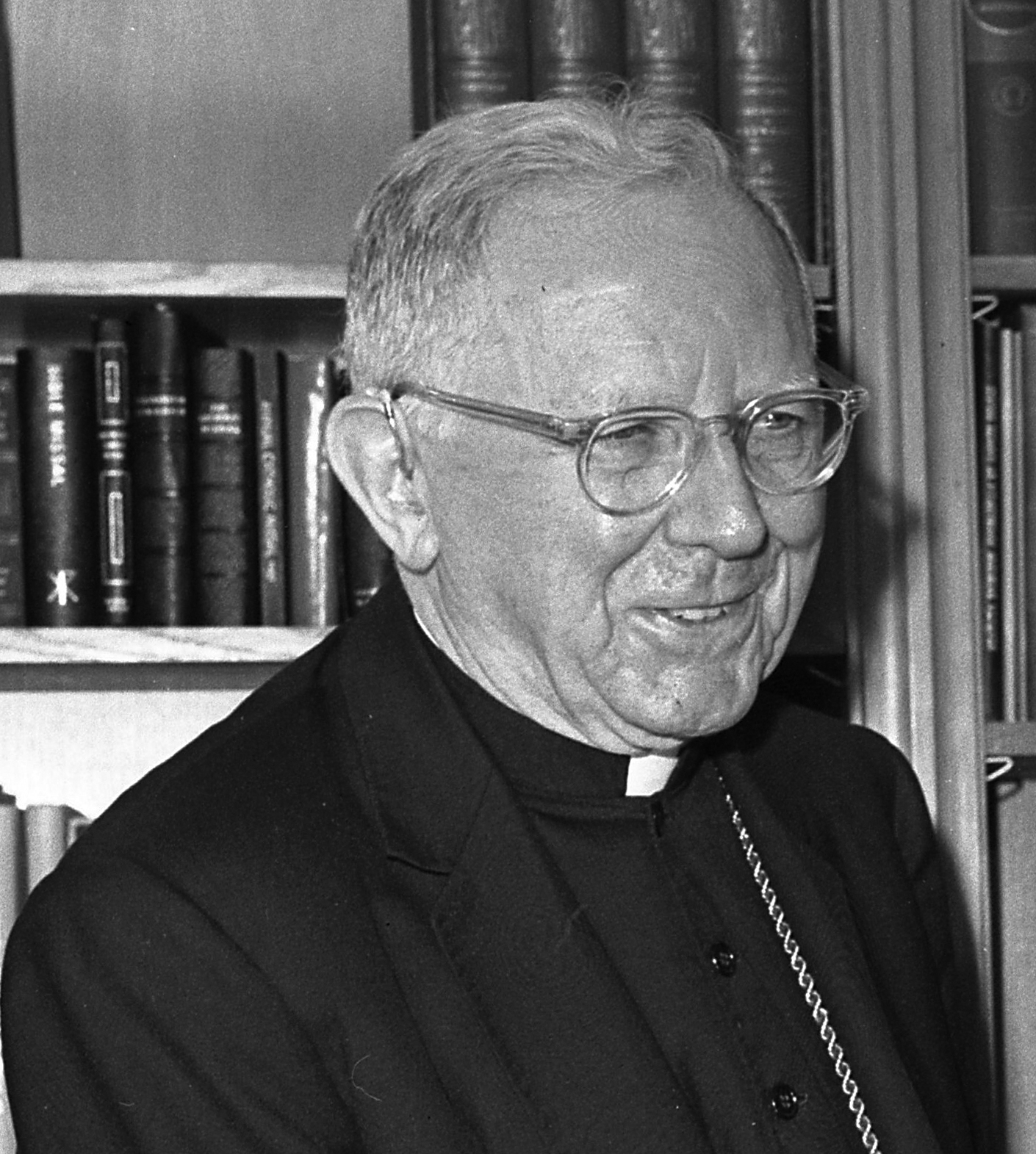
Archbishop McIntyre (1970)

In 1948, Pope Pius XII named Auxiliary Bishop James Francis McIntyre of the Archdiocese of New York as the second archbishop of Los Angeles. In McIntyre's first four years, the archdiocese established 26 new parishes, 64 new parochial schools, and 18 new high schools. At one point during his tenure, he oversaw the construction of a new church every 66 days and a new school every 26 days to accommodate the post-World War II population boom in Southern California. I

The Sisters of the Holy Cross in 1961 opened Holy Cross Medical Center in the Mission Hills section of Los Angeles. It is today Providence Holy Cross Medical Center. In 1967, McIntyre banned members of the Sisters of the Immaculate Heart of Mary from teaching in schools in the archdiocese. The nuns had recently abandoned some traditional elements of cloistered life, such as compulsory daily prayer and the wearing of habits in the classroom. In 1968, the Sacred Congregation of Religious in Rome ruled that the nuns had to restore their former practices or request dispensation from their vows.

In 1969, Pope Paul VI named Bishop Timothy Manning of the Diocese of Fresno as coadjutor archbishop in Los Angeles to assist McIntyre. When McIntyre retired in 1970, Manning succeeded him as archbishop.

Manning instituted ministries for blacks and Hispanics, a presbyterial council to grant the clergy greater participation in the governance of the archdiocese, and an Inter-Parochial Council to extend the same participation to the laity. Shortly after he became archbishop, a majority of the Sisters of the Immaculate Heart of Mary, who had feuded with McIntyre, left the religious life and founded a lay community. Manning supported the merger of the all-male Loyola University and all-female Marymount College into Loyola Marymount University in 1973.

=== 1976 to 2000 ===
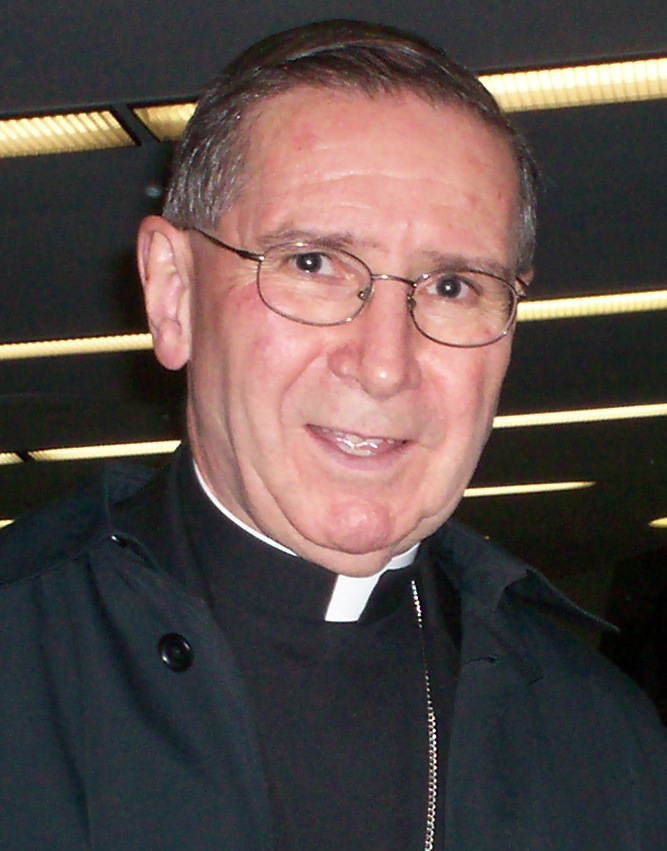
Cardinal Mahony (2006)

On March 24, 1976, Paul VI erected the Diocese of Orange, taking Orange County from the Archdiocese. This action also established the present territory of the archdiocese: Los Angeles, Santa Barbara, and Ventura Counties. Manning retired as archbishop in 1985. That same year, Pope John Paul II named Bishop Roger Mahony of the Diocese of Stockton as the next archbishop of Los Angeles.

In 1986, Archbishop Roger Mahony divided the archdiocese into five pastoral regions, each led by an auxiliary bishop who functioned as the region's episcopal vicar.

In 1987, Mahony announced the auction of the Doheny rare book collection at St. John's Seminary .The philanthropist Carrie Estelle Doheny had donated the collection to the seminary during the 1940s and 1950s. It included a Gutenberg Bible and a first edition of the 1885 novel The Adventures of Huckleberry Finn by Mark Twain. Mahony cited the financial needs of the archdiocese and the high cost of insuring the collection as the reasons for its sale. The proceeds were intended to fund an endowment for training new priests. The Doheny auction raised $37.8 million for the archdiocese. However, by 1996 the archdiocese had spent as much as $25 million of the proceeds on other projects, including $1 million to renovate Mahony's residence.

The 1994 Northridge earthquake severely damaged the Cathedral of Saint Vibiana, making it unusable. Mahony then began planning the new $190 million Cathedral of Our Lady of the Angels. Many Catholics were upset about its non-traditional design and high project cost. In response, Mahony noted that foundations and donors were funding the new cathedral, not parishes. He also said that the archdiocese needed a mother church and religious center to unite its people.

=== 2000 to present ===
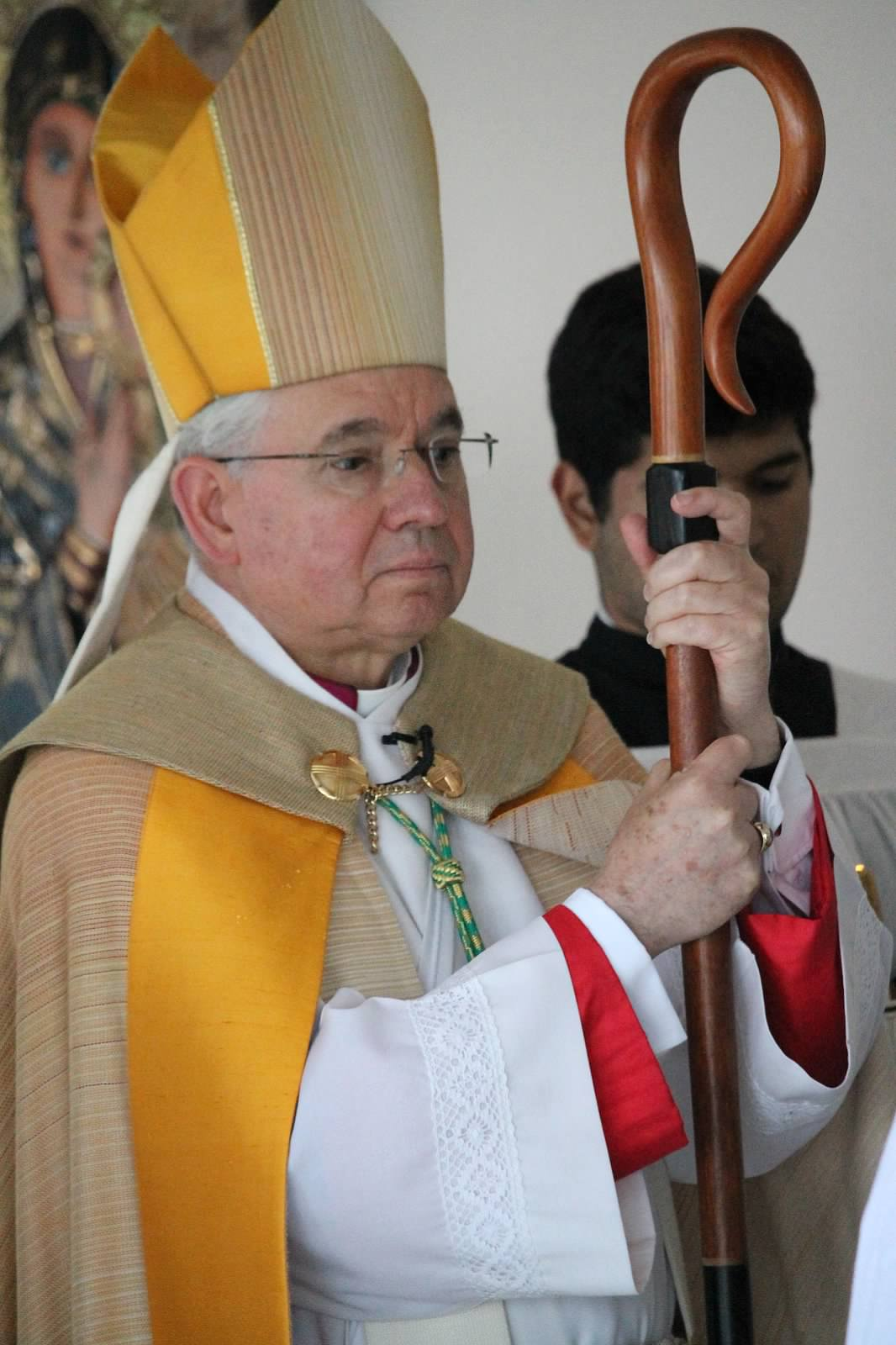
Archbishop Gomez (2016)

Our Lady of the Angels Cathedral was dedicated on September 2, 2002. On July 16, 2007, Cardinal Mahony and the archdiocese reached a record-breaking settlement with 508 alleged victims of sexual abuse by priests. The settlement was worth $660 million, with an average of $1.3 million for each plaintiff. Mahony described the abuse as a "terrible sin and crime," after a series of trials into sex abuse claims since the 1940s were to begin. The agreement settled all outstanding civil lawsuits at that time against the archdiocese.

In 2010, Pope Benedict XVI named Archbishop José H. Gómez from the Archdiocese of San Antonio as the coadjutor archbishop in Los Angeles to assist Mahony. After the Vatican accepted Mahony's resignation as archbishop of Los Angeles in 2011, Gómez automatically succeeded him.

In February 2013, Gomez relieved Mahony of all administrative duties due to his failures in handling sexual abuse allegations against priests. In March 2023, Gómez presided at the funeral mass of Auxiliary Bishop David O’Connell at the Cathedral of Our Lady of the Angels. O'Connell was shot to death at his Hacienda Heights home by Carlos Medina, the husband of O'Connell's housekeeper.

In 2014, the archdiocese agreed to pay $13 million to settle a final group of 17 sex abuse lawsuits, including eleven that involved "a visiting Mexican priest who fled prosecution and remains a fugitive more than 25 years later." The financial settlement followed a court order forcing the archdiocese to release files which showed that it had shielded accused priests, for example by ordering church officials not to turn over a list of altar boys to police who were investigating.

From May to December 2019, the archdiocese provided numerous documents to California State Attorney Xavier Becerra in preparation for a series of pending lawsuits which were expected to be filed after a new California law went into effect on January 1, 2020. In January 2020, the Los Angeles Times reported that the archdiocese settled a sexual abuse case against a former archdiocesan priest for $1.9 million.

Gómez, in June 2023, announced a special mass in Los Angeles to mark a day of prayer in reparation. This mass was in response to the plan of the Los Angeles Dodgers professional baseball team to honor the Sisters of Perpetual Indulgence at an upcoming game. Gómez denounced the Sisters, an LGBTQ activist and satirical group, as blasphemers.

=== Pastoral regions ===
==== Our Lady of the Angels ====
The Our Lady of the Angels Pastoral Region covers downtown and central Los Angeles west to Malibu and south to Los Angeles International Airport. The region contains the cathedral, 78 parishes, 12 high schools, two Catholic hospitals, one cemetery, four parochial missions, one seminary, and no Spanish missions. As of 2025, the episcopal vicar is Bishop Matthew G. Elshoff.

==== San Fernando ====
The San Fernando Pastoral Region includes the San Fernando, Santa Clarita and Antelope Valleys and northeast Los Angeles. The region has 54 parishes, 12 Catholic high schools, three Catholic hospitals, two cemeteries, seven parochial missions, one active-duty military chapel installation, and one Spanish mission. As of 2025, Bishop Albert M. Bahhuth is the episcopal vicar.

==== San Gabriel ====
The San Gabriel Pastoral Region covers East Los Angeles through the San Gabriel Valley and the Pomona Valley. The region has 66 parishes, 13 Catholic high schools, three Catholic hospitals, four cemeteries, two parochial missions and one Spanish mission. As of 2025, Bishop Brian A. Nunes serves as the episcopal vicar.

==== San Pedro ====
The San Pedro Pastoral Region contains Long Beach and southern Los Angeles County. The region has 67 parishes, eight Catholic high schools, four Catholic hospitals, one cemetery, one active duty military chapel installation, and one parochial mission. Gómez appointed Bishop Marc V. Trudeau as episcopal vicar for this region in 2018.

==== Santa Barbara ====
The Santa Barbara Pastoral Region covers Santa Barbara and Ventura Counties. The region has 37 parishes, six Catholic high schools, three Catholic hospitals, four cemeteries, three active duty military chapel installations, six parochial missions and four Spanish missions. As of 2025, the episcopal vicar is Bishop Sławomir Szkredka.

== Archbishop ==
The archdiocese is led by the archbishop, who governs from the mother church, the Cathedral of Our Lady of the Angels. The cathedral was dedicated on September 2, 2002, and replaced the former Cathedral of Saint Vibiana, damaged in the 1994 Northridge earthquake.

The archbishop of Los Angeles is the metropolitan of the Province of Los Angeles of the Catholic Church. Its suffragans are the dioceses of Fresno, Monterey in California, Orange in California, San Bernardino, and San Diego. Metropolitan archbishops historically wielded great administrative powers over the suffragan dioceses. Today, such power is only ceremonial and kept as a tradition.

José H. Gómez is the current archbishop of Los Angeles, having succeeded his predecessor, Cardinal Roger Mahony, who served for 25 years, upon the latter's retirement on March 1, 2011. Previously, Gómez served as coadjutor archbishop of Los Angeles since his appointment by Pope Benedict XVI on April 6, 2010. He is an ordained priest of Opus Dei.

Gómez is assisted by the current auxiliary bishops: Marc Vincent Trudeau, Albert Bahhuth, Slawomir Szkredka, Matthew Elshoff, Brian Nunes, and Alejandro D. Aclan. In addition, Edward W. Clark and Gerald Eugene Wilkerson are retired auxiliary bishops still living and residing within the archdiocese.

== Bishops ==
=== Bishop of California (Two Californias, Both Californias) ===
Francisco Garcia Diego y Moreno (1840–1846)

=== Bishop of Monterey ===
Joseph Alemany (1850–1853), appointed Archbishop of San Francisco

=== Bishops of Monterey-Los Angeles ===
1. Thaddeus Amat y Brusi (1853–1878)
2. Francisco Mora y Borrell (1878–1896; coadjutor bishop 1873–1878)
3. George Thomas Montgomery (1896–1902; coadjutor bishop 1894–1896), appointed Coadjutor Archbishop of San Francisco but died before succession to that see
4. Thomas James Conaty (1903–1915)
5. John Joseph Cantwell (1917–1922), title changed with title of diocese

=== Bishop of Los Angeles-San Diego ===
John Joseph Cantwell (1922–1936), elevated to Archbishop of Los Angeles

=== Archbishops of Los Angeles ===
1. John Joseph Cantwell (1936–1947)
2. James Francis McIntyre (1948–1970)
3. Timothy Manning (1970–1985)
4. Roger Mahony (1985–2011)
5. José Horacio Gómez (2011–present; coadjutor archbishop 2010–2011)

=== Current auxiliary bishops of Los Angeles ===
- Marc Vincent Trudeau (2018–present) – San Pedro Pastoral Region
- Albert Bahhuth (2023–present) – San Fernando Pastoral Region
- Matthew Elshoff (2023–present) – Our Lady of the Angels Pastoral Region
- Brian Nunes (2023–present) – San Gabriel Pastoral Region
- Slawomir Szkredka (2023–present) – Santa Barbara Pastoral Region

=== Former auxiliary bishops of Los Angeles ===
- Joseph Thomas McGucken (1941–1955), appointed Bishop of Sacramento and later Archbishop of San Francisco
- Timothy Manning (1946–1967), appointed Bishop of Fresno and later Coadjutor Archbishop and Archbishop of Los Angeles(see above); created cardinal in 1973
- Alden John Bell (1956–1962), appointed Bishop of Sacramento
- John J. Ward (1963–1996)
- Joseph Patrick Dougherty (1969–1970)
- William Robert Johnson (1971–1976), appointed Bishop of Orange
- Juan Alfredo Arzube (1971–1993)
- Thaddeus Anthony Shubsda (1976–1982), appointed Bishop of Monterey in California
- Manuel Duran Moreno (1976–1982), appointed Coadjutor Bishop and later Bishop of Tucson
- Donald William Montrose (1983–1985), appointed Bishop of Stockton
- William Levada (1983–1986), appointed Archbishop of Portland in Oregon and later Archbishop of San Francisco and Prefect of Congregation for the Doctrine of the Faith (elevated to Cardinal in 2006)
- Carl Anthony Fisher (1986–1993)
- Armando Xavier Ochoa (1986–1996), appointed Bishop of El Paso and later Bishop of Fresno
- George Patrick Ziemann (1986–1992), appointed Bishop of Santa Rosa in California
- Sylvester Donovan Ryan (1990–1992), appointed Bishop of Monterey in California
- Stephen Blaire (1990–1999), appointed Bishop of Stockton
- Thomas John Curry (1994–2018)
- Joseph Martin Sartoris (1994–2002)
- Gabino Zavala (1994–2012)
- Gerald Eugene Wilkerson (1997–2015)
- Edward W. Clark (2001–2022)
- Oscar Azarcon Solis (2003–2017), appointed Bishop of Salt Lake City
- Alexander Salazar (2004–2018)
- Joseph Vincent Brennan (2015–2019), appointed Bishop of Fresno
- Robert E. Barron (2015–2022) appointed Bishop of Winona-Rochester
- David G. O'Connell (2015–2023)
- Alejandro D. Aclan (2019–2026)

=== Other priests of the diocese who became bishops ===
Note: Years in parentheses indicate the time of service as a priest of the Archdiocese of Los Angeles (or predecessor diocese), prior to appointment to the episcopacy.

- Robert Emmet Lucey (1922–1934), appointed Bishop of Amarillo and later Archbishop of San Antonio
- John Thomas Steinbock (1963–1984), appointed Auxiliary Bishop of Orange and later Bishop of Fresno
- Justin F. Rigali (1961–1985), appointed President of the Pontifical Ecclesiastical Academy and later Secretary of the Congregation for Bishops and the College of Cardinals, Archbishop of Saint Louis, and Archbishop of Philadelphia (elevated to Cardinal in 2003)
- Michael Patrick Driscoll (1965–1989), appointed Auxiliary Bishop of Orange and later Bishop of Boise
- George Hugh Niederauer (1962–1994), appointed Bishop of Salt Lake City and Archbishop of San Francisco
- Dennis Patrick O'Neil (1966–2001), appointed Auxiliary Bishop of San Bernardino

== Schools ==
There are five colleges and over 50 high schools within the Archdiocese of Los Angeles. Many churches have affiliated primary schools as well.

== Events ==
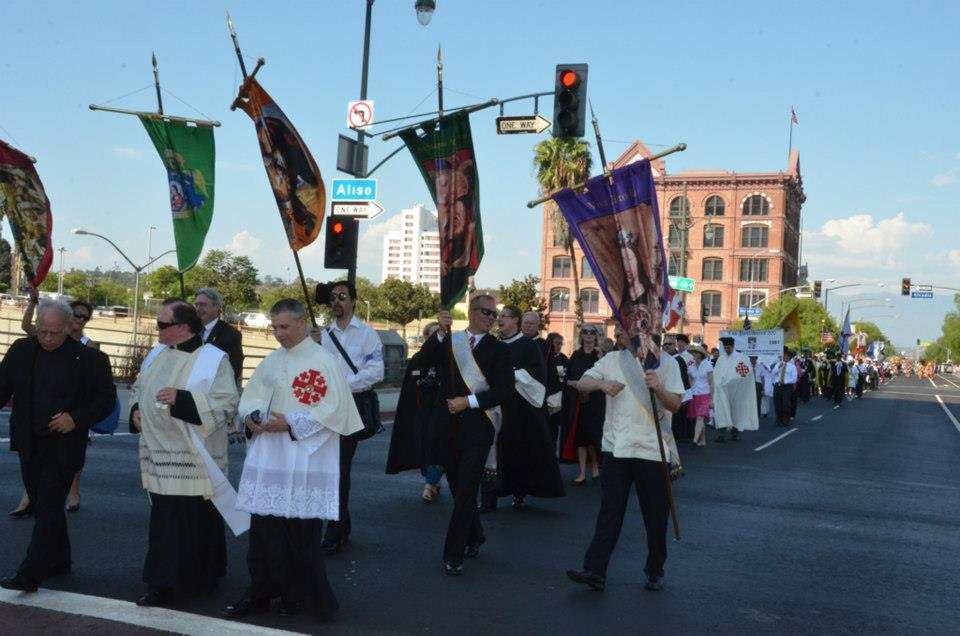
2012 Grand Marian Procession through Downtown Los Angeles

Delegation from the Slovak Consulate General in the 2012 Grand Marian Procession

=== Religious education congress ===
The archdiocese's office of religious education produces the Los Angeles Religious Education Congress, the largest annual event of its kind in the United States, with an attendance of approximately 38,000.

== Holy days of obligation ==
As directed by the U.S. Conference of Catholic Bishops' Committee on the Liturgy and the Ecclesiastical Province of Los Angeles, the archdiocese annually observes four holy days of obligation. The Catholic Church currently recognizes 10 holy days, established in the 1917 Code of Canon Law. However, the USCCB has reduced that number to six for Latin Church dioceses in the United States. As of January 1993, no provinces in the United States celebrate the solemnities of Epiphany (which transfers to the Sunday after January 1), Corpus Christi (which transfers to the Sunday after Trinity Sunday), Saint Joseph, or the Saints Peter and Paul, Apostles as holy days of obligation. The Metropolitan Province of Los Angeles, which includes the L.A. Archdiocese, further modified the list, and as of 2019, celebrates four holy days of obligation on the days prescribed by canon law. The solemnity of the Ascension is transferred from Thursday of the sixth week of Easter to the seventh Sunday of Easter. The province has abrogated the obligation to attend mass on the Solemnity of Mary, Mother of God.

- Assumption of the Blessed Virgin Mary – August 15th. If a Saturday or Monday, there is no obligation to attend mass.
- All Saints – November 1st. If a Saturday or Monday, there is no obligation to attend mass.
- Immaculate Conception– December 8th. If as Sunday, the solemnity transfers to the following Monday and there is no obligation to attend mass.
- Nativity of Our Lord Jesus Christ– December 25th

== Province of Los Angeles ==
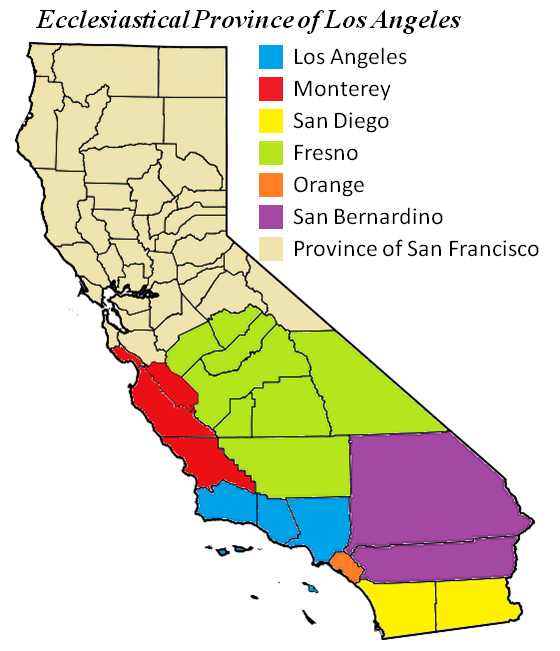
Map of the Ecclesiastical Province of Los Angeles

See: List of the Catholic bishops of the United States

The Archdiocese of Los Angeles includes the following suffragan dioceses in its ecclesiastical province:

- Diocese of Fresno
- Diocese of Monterey
- Diocese of Orange
- Diocese of San Bernardino
- Diocese of San Diego

== See also ==
- List of churches in the Roman Catholic Archdiocese of Los Angeles
- List of schools in the Roman Catholic Archdiocese of Los Angeles
- List of the Catholic dioceses of the United States
- Queen of Angels Foundation
