= San Gabriel Pastoral Region =

Roman Catholic Archdiocese of Los Angeles

The San Gabriel Pastoral Region is a pastoral region of the Archdiocese of Los Angeles in the Roman Catholic Church. It covers the community of East Los Angeles through the San Gabriel and Pomona valleys in California.

In 1986, Los Angeles Archbishop Roger Mahony divided the archdiocese into five pastoral regions to make church leaders more accessible to parishioners. This pastoral region is divided into four deaneries.

As of 2024, the San Gabriel region has 67 parishes, 13 high schools, 49 elementary schools, four cemeteries, and a Spanish Mission. There are no Catholic hospitals or universities in this region. Bishop Brian Nunes currently serves as episcopal vicar for the region.

== Parishes ==
=== Deanery 9 (East Los Angeles, Los Angeles and Commerce) ===
Church name	Image	Address	Community
All Saints		3431 Portola Ave. 34°05′08″N 118°10′22″W	Los Angeles – El Sereno
Assumption		2832 Blanchard St. 34°02′54″N 118°11′52″W	Los Angeles – Boyle Heights
Dolores Mission		171 Ss Gless St. 34°02′44″N 118°13′23″W	Los Angeles – Aliso Village
Our Lady Help of Christians		512 Ss Avenue 20 34°04′02″N 118°13′04″W	Los Angeles – Lincoln Heights
Our Lady of Guadalupe		4018 Hammel St. (parish) 34°02′31″N 118°10′45″W; 4100 E. 2nd St. (sanctuary) 34°02′02″N 118°10′39″W	East Los Angeles
Our Lady of Guadalupe (Rose Hill)		4509 Mercury Ave. 34°05′09″N 118°11′24″W	Los Angeles – Rose Hills
Our Lady of Lourdes		3772 E. 3rd St. 34°01′58″N 118°11′12″W	East Los Angeles
Our Lady of Solitude		4561 Cesar E. Chavez Ave. 34°02′26″N 118°10′02″W	East Los Angeles
Our Lady of the Rosary of Talpa		2914 E. 4th St. 34°02′13″N 118°12′16″W	Los Angeles – Boyle Heights
Our Lady of Victory		1316 S. Herbert Ave. 34°00′58″N 118°11′00″W	East Los Angeles
Our Lady Queen of Martyrs Church (Armenian)		1327 Pleasant Ave. 34°03′06″N 118°13′19″W	Los Angeles – Boyle Heights
Resurrection		3324 E. Opal St. 34°01′21″N 118°12′20″W	Los Angeles – Boyle Heights
Sacred Heart		2210 Sichel St. 34°04′13″N 118°12′45″W	Los Angeles – Lincoln Heights
San Antonio de Padua		555 N. Fairview Ave. 34°03′10″N 118°13′14″W	Los Angeles – Boyle Heights
San Francisco		4800 E. Olympic Blvd. 34°01′03″N 118°09′56″W	East Los Angeles
Santa Isabel		918 S. Soto St. 34°02′01″N 118°12′57″W	Los Angeles – Boyle Heights
Santa Teresita		2645 Zonal Ave. 34°03′26″N 118°11′51″W	Los Angeles – Lincoln Heights
St. Alphonsus		5223 Hastings St. 34°01′33″N 118°09′16″W	East Los Angeles
St. Camillus Catholic Center for Pastoral Care		1911 Zonal Ave. 34°03′40″N 118°12′31″W	Los Angeles – Los Angeles County/USC Medical Center
St. Lucy		1419 N. Hazard Ave. 34°03′21″N 118°10′44″W	Los Angeles – City Terrace
St. Marcellinus		2349 Strong Ave. 34°00′15″N 118°09′47″W	City of Commerce
St. Marys		407 S. Chicago St. 34°02′29″N 118°12′52″W	Los Angeles – Boyle Heights

=== Deanery 10 (Pasadena, Alhambra and other communities) ===
Church name	Image	Address	Community
All Souls		17 S. Electric Ave. 34°05′27″N 118°08′23″W	Alhambra
St. Thomas More		2510 S. Fremont Ave. 34°03′50″N 118°08′49″W	Alhambra
St. Therese of Lisieux		510 N. El Molino St. 34°06′20″N 118°07′08″W	Alhambra
Sacred Heart		2889 N. Lincoln Ave. 34°11′43″N 118°09′32″W	Altadena
St. Elizabeth of Hungary		1879 N. Lake Ave. 34°10′40″N 118°07′55″W	Altadena
St. Mary Romanian Greek Catholic Mission			Altadena
Our Lady of the Miraculous Medal		820 N. Garfield Ave. 34°01′49″N 118°07′40″W	Montebello
St. Benedict		1022 Cleveland Ave. 34°00′46″N 118°06′41″W	Montebello
St. Stephen Martyr		320 W. Garvey Ave. 34°03′43″N 118°07′34″W	Monterey Park
St. Thomas Aquinas		1501 S. Atlantic Blvd. 34°02′43″N 118°08′33″W	Monterey Park
Assumption of the Blessed Virgin Mary		2640 E. Orange Grove Blvd. 34°09′26″N 118°05′45″W	Pasadena
St. Andrew		311 N. Raymond Ave. 34°09′02″N 118°08′56″W	Pasadena
St. Philip the Apostle		151 S. Hill Ave. 34°08′37″N 118°07′19″W	Pasadena
Mission San Gabriel		537 W. Mission Dr. 34°05′48″N 118°06′23″W	San Gabriel
St. Anthony		1901 S. San Gabriel Blvd. 34°04′29″N 118°05′28″W	San Gabriel
SS. Felicitas and Perpetua		1190 Palomar Rd. 34°07′37″N 118°05′33″W	San Marino
St. Rita		50 E. Alegria Ave. 34°10′03″N 118°03′04″W	Sierra Madre
Holy Family		1527 Fremont Ave. 34°06′28″N 118°09′12″W	South Pasadena
St. Luke the Evangelist		5605 Cloverly Ave. 34°06′04″N 118°03′46″W	Temple City

=== Deanery 11 (Arcadia, Covina, Glendora, Monrovia and other communities) ===
Church name	Image	Address	Community
Annunciation		1307 E. Longden Ave. 34°06′52″N 118°00′18″W	Mayflower Village
Holy Angels		370 Campus Dr. 34°07′51″N 118°02′44″W	Arcadia
St. Frances of Rome		501 E. Foothill Blvd. 34°08′00″N 117°54′08″W	Azusa
St. John the Baptist		3848 Stewart Ave. 34°04′55″N 117°58′02″W	Baldwin Park
Sacred Heart		314 W. Workman St. 34°04′31″N 117°53′39″W	Covina
St. Louise de Marillac		1720 E. Covina Blvd. 34°05′57″N 117°52′46″W	Covina
Nativity		3743 N. Tyler Ave. 34°04′41″N 118°02′01″W	El Monte
Our Lady of Guadalupe		11359 Coffield Ave. 34°04′28″N 118°01′32″W	El Monte
Epiphany		10911 Michael Hunt Dr. 34°02′43″N 118°02′30″W	South El Monte
St. Dorothy		241 S. Valley Center Ave. 34°06′24″N 117°50′15″W	Glendora
Our Lady of Guadalupe		16025 E. Cypress St. 34°05′46″N 117°55′59″W	Irwindale
St. Louis of France		13935 East Temple Ave. 34°02′53″N 117°58′41″W	La Puente (Bassett)
Immaculate Conception		740 S. Shamrock Ave. 34°08′36″N 117°59′26″W	Monrovia
St. Christopher		629 S. Glendora Ave. 34°03′53″N 117°55′43″W	West Covina

=== Deanery 12 (Pomona, San Dimas and other communities) ===
Church name	Image	Address	Community
Our Lady of the Assumption		435 Berkeley Ave. 34°05′51″N 117°43′23″W	Claremont
St. Denis		2151 Diamond Bar Blvd. 33°59′09″N 117°43′23″W	Diamond Bar
St. John Vianney		1345 Turnbull Canyon Rd. 34°00′37″N 117°58′44″W	Hacienda Heights
St. Joseph		550 N. Glendora Ave. 34°01′38″N 117°57′03″W	La Puente
Sacred Heart		1215 S. Hamilton Blvd. 34°02′54″N 117°45′48″W	Pomona
St. Joseph		1150 W. Holt Ave. 34°03′39″N 117°46′07″W	Pomona
St. Madeleine		931 E. Kingsley Ave. 34°04′00″N 117°43′57″W	Pomona
St. Elizabeth Ann Seton		1835 Larkvane Rd .33°59′11″N 117°54′33″W	Rowland Heights
Holy Name of Mary		724 E. Bonita Ave .34°06′22″N 117°49′36″W	San Dimas
St. Martha		444 N. Azusa Ave. 34°01′31″N 117°54′58″W	Valinda
St. Lorenzo Ruiz		747 Meadow Pass Rd. 34°01′38″N 117°51′58″W	Walnut

== Spanish mission ==
Mission name	Image	Address	Community
Mission San Gabriel Arcángel		537 W. Mission Dr. 34°05′48″N 118°06′23″W	San Gabriel

== High schools ==
School name	Image	Address	Community
Ramona Convent Secondary School		1701 W. Ramona Rd. 34°04′24″N 118°08′23″W	Alhambra
St. Lucy's Priory High School		655 W. Sierra Madre Ave. 34°08′53″N 117°52′37″W	Glendora
Bishop Amat High School		14301 Fairgrove Ave. 34°03′15″N 117°57′54″W	La Puente
Damien High School		2280 Damien Ave. 34°06′15″N 117°47′14″W	La Verne
Bishop Mora Salesian High School		960 S. Soto St. 34°01′58″N 118°12′58″W	Los Angeles
Sacred Heart High School		2111 N. Griffin Ave. 34°04′11″N 118°12′43″W	Los Angeles
Cantwell Sacred Heart of Mary School		329 N. Garfield Ave. 34°01′02″N 118°07′48″W	Montebello
La Salle High School		3880 E. Sierra Madre Blvd. 34°09′40″N 118°04′05″W	Pasadena
Mayfield Senior School		500 Bellefontaine St. 34°07′49″N 118°09′41″W	Pasadena
St. Monica Academy		301 N. Orange Grove Blvd. 34°08′59″N 118°09′36″W	Pasadena
Pomona Catholic High School		533 W. Holt Ave. 34°03′45″N 117°45′29″W	Pomona
San Gabriel Mission High School		254 S. Santa Anita St. 34°05′56″N 118°06′25″W	San Gabriel
Alverno High School		200 N. Michillinda Ave. 34°09′56″N 118°03′59″W	Sierra Madre

== Elementary schools ==
=== Los Angeles ===
- All Saints
- Assumption
- Dolores Mission
- Our Lady Help of Christians
- Our Lady of Guadalupe, 436 N. Hazard Ave.
- Our Lady of Guadalupe, 4522 Browne Ave.
- Our Lady of Lourdes
- Our Lady of Soledad
- Our Lady of Talpa
- Resurrection
- Sacred Heart
- San Antonio de Padua
- Santa Isabel
- Santa Teresita
- St. Alphonsus
- St. Mary

=== Other communities ===
- All Souls, Alhambra
- Ramona Convent, Alhambra
- St. Therese, Alhambra
- St. Thomas More, Alhambra
- St. Elizabeth, Altadena
- Annunciation, Arcadia
- Holy Angels, Arcadia
- St. Frances of Rome, Azusa
- St. John the Baptist, Baldwin Park
- Our Lady of the Assumption, Claremont
- Sacred Heart, Covina
- St. Louise de Marillac, Covina
- Nativity, El Monte
- St. Dorothy, Glendora
- St. Joseph, La Puente
- St. Louis of France, La Puente
- St. Martha, La Puente
- Immaculate Conception, Monrovia
- Our Lady of the Miraculous Medal, Montebello
- St. Benedict, Montebello
- St. Stephen, Monterey Park
- St. Thomas Aquinas, Monterey Park
- Armenian Sisters Academy, Montrose
- Assumption of the Blessed Virgin Mary, Pasadena
- Mayfield Junior School, Pasadena
- St. Andrew, Pasadena
- St. Philip the Apostle, Pasadena
- St. Joseph, Pomona
- St. Madeleine, Pomona
- Holy Name of Mary, San Dimas
- San Gabriel Mission, San Gabriel
- St. Anthony, San Gabriel
- SS. Felicitas & Perpetua, San Marino
- St. Rita, Sierra Madre
- Epiphany, South El Monte
- Holy Family, South Pasadena
- St. Luke, Temple City
- St. Christopher, West Covina

== Cemeteries ==
- Calvary Cemetery & Mortuary, East Los Angeles
- Holy Cross Cemetery and Mausoleum, Pomona
- Queen of Heaven Cemetery and Mortuary, Rowland Heights
- Resurrection Cemetery and Mausoleum, Monterey Park

== See also ==
Roman Catholic Archdiocese of Los Angeles

- Our Lady of the Angels Pastoral Region
- San Fernando Pastoral Region
- San Pedro Pastoral Region
- Santa Barbara Pastoral Region

List of schools in the Roman Catholic Archdiocese of Los Angeles
