= Alejandro D. Aclan =

Filipino American prelate (born 1951)

His Excellency, The Most Reverend Alejandro D. Aclan
- Auxiliary Bishop Emeritus of Los Angeles
- Archdiocese: Los Angeles
- Appointed: March 5, 2019
- Installed: May 16, 2019
- Retired: May 22, 2026
- Other post: Titular Bishop of Rusicade (2019–)

Orders
- Ordination: June 5, 1993 by Roger Mahony
- Consecration: May 16, 2019 by José Horacio Gómez, Roger Mahony, and Oscar A. Solis

Personal details
- Born: February 9, 1951 (age 75) Pasay, Rizal, Philippines
- Education: University of Santo Tomas; St. John’s Seminary
- Motto: One body, one spirit
- Styles
- Reference style: His Excellency; The Most Reverend
- Spoken style: Your Excellency
- Religious style: Bishop

Alejandro Dumbrigue Aclan (born February 9, 1951) is a Filipino American Catholic prelate who served as an auxiliary bishop of the Archdiocese of Los Angeles in California from 2019 until his retirement in 2026.

== Biography ==
=== Early life ===
Alejandro Dumbrigue Aclan was born on February 9, 1951, in Pasay City in the Philippines, the third of eight children born to Geronimo and Emerenciana Aclan. His father, Geronimo, served as a pilot in the Philippine Army Air Corps during World War II and was considered a war hero in the Philippines.

Before Aclan entered high school, his family moved from Manila to Makati. While attending a high school operated by the Salesians of Don Bosco, he began thinking about joining the priesthood. After his graduation, Aclan entered the University of Santo Tomas in Manila to study medicine, but instead graduated in 1971 with a degree in medical technology. After graduation, Aclan taught at the university for a while, then started working for corporations as a programmer and systems analyst. He eventually reached middle management positions for the San Miguel Corporation and Citibank Philippines.

In 1982, Aclan and his family immigrated to Covina, California, where he took a position at Union Bank of California. While still working at the bank, he started seriously exploring the idea of become a priest. In 1988, Aclan entered St. John’s Seminary in Camarillo, California.

=== Priesthood ===
On June 5, 1993, Aclan was ordained to the priesthood for the Archdiocese of Los Angeles by Cardinal Roger Mahony at the Cathedral of Saint Vibiana in Los Angeles.

Between 1993 and 2001, Aclan served as an associate pastor at St. Finbar Parish in Burbank, California, then at St. John of God Parish in Norwalk, California. During these pastoral assignments, Aclan also served as director of vocations in progress for the archdiocese between 1996 and 1999.

Aclan left St. John in 2001 to become pastor of St. Madeleine Parish in Pomona, California, staying there for the next 11 years. While at St Madeleine, he also served as treasurer/council of priests from 2006 to 2010 and as regional vocations director for the San Gabriel Valley Pastoral Region from 2010 to 2012.In 2014, Archbishop José Horacio Gómez named Aclan as vicar for clergy for the archdiocese. The Vatican in 2017 elevated him to the rank of prelate of honor, with the title of monsignor.

=== Auxiliary Bishop of Los Angeles ===
Pope Francis appointed Aclan as titular bishop of Rusicade and auxiliary bishop for the Archdiocese of Los Angeles on March 5, 2019. On May 16, 2019, Aclan was consecrated as a bishop at Our Lady of the Angels Cathedral in Los Angeles by Archbishop José Gómez, with Mahony and Auxiliary Bishop Oscar A. Solis serving as co-consecrators.

As auxiliary bishop, Aclan was appointed episcopal vicar for the San Fernando Pastoral Region on May 16, 2019. On April 2, 2021, Aclan attended a prayer vigil at Incarnation Church in Glendale, California, to support Asian women across the United States who had been victims of hate crime attacks.

On August 20, 2022, Aclan suffered a stroke and was hospitalized. By December, he had returned home to recover, with Auxiliary Bishop Emeritus Gerald Wilkerson appointed as interim episcopal vicar for San Fernando during Aclan's recovery. In July 2023, the archdiocese announced that Auxiliary Bishop Albert Bahhuth would permanently replace Aclan as episcopal vicar as his recovery from the stroke continued.

On May 22, 2026, Pope Leo XIV accepted Aclan’s resignation.

== See also ==
- Catholic Church hierarchy
- Catholic Church in the United States
- Historical list of the Catholic bishops of the United States
- List of Catholic bishops of the United States
- Lists of patriarchs, archbishops, and bishops

== Episcopal succession ==
Catholic Church titles
Preceded by -	Auxiliary Bishop of Los Angeles; 2019-2026	Succeeded by -
