= Gerald Eugene Wilkerson =

American prelate

The Most Reverend Gerald Eugene Wilkerson
- Auxiliary Bishop Emeritus of Los Angeles
- See: Archdiocese of Los Angeles
- Appointed: November 5, in 1997
- Installed: January 21, 1998
- Retired: July 21, 2015

Orders
- Ordination: January 5, 1965 by James Francis McIntyre
- Consecration: January 21, 1998 by Roger Mahony, Michael Patrick Driscoll, and Joseph Martin Sartoris

Personal details
- Born: October 21, 1939 (age 86) Des Moines, Iowa, US
- Education: St. John's Seminary
- Motto: Walk in integrity of heart

Styles of Gerald Eugene Wilkerson
- Reference style: His Excellency; The Most Reverend
- Spoken style: Your Excellency
- Religious style: Bishop

Gerald Eugene Wilkerson (born October 21, 1939) is an American prelate of the Roman Catholic Church. He served as an auxiliary bishop of the Archdiocese of Los Angeles in California from 1997 to 2015 and as apostolic administrator for the Diocese of Monterey in California for six months in 2018 and 2019.

== Biography ==
=== Early life ===
Gerald Wilkerson was born on October 21, 1939, in Des Moines, Iowa. His family later moved to Long Beach, California. He attended St. John's Seminary in Camarillo, California.

Wilkerson was ordained a priest for the Archdiocese of Los Angeles on January 5, 1965, by Cardinal James McIntyre. After his ordination, Wilkerson served as associate pastor at three Southern California parishes:

- Our Lady of Guadalupe in La Habra
- St. Michael in Los Angeles
- American Martyrs in Manhattan Beach

Wilkerson then was posted for 15 years at Our Lady of Grace Parish in Encino, California, first as administrator and then as pastor.

=== Auxiliary Bishop of Los Angeles ===
On November 5, 1997, Pope John Paul II appointed Wilkerson as the titular bishop of Vincennes and as an auxiliary bishop of Los Angeles. He was consecrated on January 21, 1998, at Our Lady of Grace Church in Encino, California. Cardinal Roger Mahony was his principal consecrator, while Bishop Michael Driscoll and Bishop Joseph M. Sartoris were his principal co-consecrators.

Wilkerson led the archdiocese's San Fernando Pastoral Region with 54 parishes, 12 high schools, two hospitals, and five missions.

== Retirement ==
On July 21, 2015, Pope Francis accepted Wilkerson's letter of retirement as auxiliary bishop of the Archdiocese of Los Angeles, sent because Wilkerson had reached the retirement age of 75 for bishops.

On July 20, 2018, Pope Francis appointed Wilkerson as the apostolic administrator for the Diocese of Monterey after the death of Bishop Richard Garcia. On December 19, 2018, Wilkerson announced that the diocese was hiring an outside law firm to examine its personnel records for any credible allegations of sexual abuse by clergy. Wilkerson left the apostolic administrator position on January 29, 2019, after the installation of Bishop Daniel E Garcia as the new bishop of Monterey

On September 12, 2022, Archbishop Jose Horacio Gomez appointed Wilkerson as interim episcopal vicar after Bishop Alejandro Aclan suffered a stroke. On September 26, 2023, Auxiliary Bishop Albert Bahhuth replaced Wilkerson as the permanent episcopal vicar for the San Fernando Pastoral Region.

== See also ==
- Catholic Church hierarchy
- Catholic Church in the United States
- Historical list of the Catholic bishops of the United States
- List of Catholic bishops of the United States
- Lists of patriarchs, archbishops, and bishops

== Episcopal succession ==
Catholic Church titles
| Preceded by - | Auxiliary Bishop of Los Angeles; 1998-2015 | Succeeded by - |
| Preceded by - | Titular Bishop of Vincennes; 1997- | Succeeded by - |
