= John Ward (auxiliary bishop of Los Angeles) =

American Catholic bishop (1920–2011)

His Excellency, The Most Reverend John James Ward
- Auxiliary Bishop of Los Angeles; Titular Bishop of Bria; Titular Bishop of California
- Church: Catholic
- Archdiocese: Los Angeles
- Other post: Titular Bishop of Bria

Orders
- Ordination: May 4, 1946 by John Joseph Cantwell
- Consecration: December 12, 1963 by James Francis McIntyre

Personal details
- Born: September 28, 1920 Los Angeles, California, US
- Died: January 10, 2011 (aged 90) Culver City, California, US
- Education: St. John's Seminary; The Catholic University of America
- Motto: Sub cruce salus (Salvation under the cross)

Styles of John J. Ward
- Reference style: The Most Reverend
- Spoken style: Your Excellency
- Religious style: Monsignor
- Posthumous style: not applicable

John James Ward (September 28, 1920 – January 10, 2011) was an American prelate of the Roman Catholic Church. He served as an auxiliary bishop of the Archdiocese of Los Angeles in California from 1963 to 1996. Prior to his death, he was just one of three American bishops still living to have participated in the Second Vatican Council.

== Biography ==
=== Early life ===
One of two sons, Ward was born in Los Angeles, California on September 28, 1920, to Irish immigrants Hugh and Mary (McHugh) Ward. He entered St. John's Seminary in 1940.

=== Priesthood ===
Ward was ordained to the priesthood at the Cathedral of Saint Vibiana in Los Angeles by Archbishop John Cantwell on May 4, 1946. From 1949 to 1952, he studied at The Catholic University of America School of Canon Law in Washington, D.C., where he earned a licentiate in canon law.

=== Auxiliary Bishop of Los Angeles ===
On October 16, 1963, Ward was appointed as an auxiliary bishop of Los Angeles and titular bishop of Bria by Pope Paul VI. He received his episcopal consecration on December 12, 1963, from Cardinal James McIntyre at St. Vibiana Cathedral, with Archbishop Joseph McGucken and Bishop Alden Bell serving as co-consecrators.

Attending the Second Vatican Council in Rome from 1964 to 1965, he later became vicar general of the archdiocese in 1970 and episcopal vicar of Our Lady of the Angels Pastoral Region in 1986. In addition to his duties as bishop, he was pastor of St. Timothy's Church.

=== Retirement and death ===
Upon reaching the mandatory retirement age of 75, Ward resigned from his post as an auxiliary bishop on May 7, 1996. He was named titular bishop of California on June 15, 1996. Ward died of natural causes on January 10, 2011, at age 90.
