= St. John's Seminary (California) =

Catholic school in California, US

- Motto: Deus caritas est
- Motto in English: God is love
- Type: Private graduate school of theology
- Established: 1939; 87 years ago
- Religious affiliation: Catholic Church
- Chairman: José H. Gomez
- President: Chris Meissner
- Rector: Leon Hutton
- Faculty: 29
- Administrative staff: 37
- Students: 96 seminarians (2014–15); 17 lay (2014–15)
- Location: Camarillo, California, United States; 34.24308°N 119.005329°W
- Campus: Suburban, 100 acres (40 ha)
- Website: www.stjohnsem.edu

St. John's Seminary is a private Catholic graduate school of theology in Camarillo, California. Its constituent undergraduate school, St. John's Seminary College, closed in 2002.

== History ==
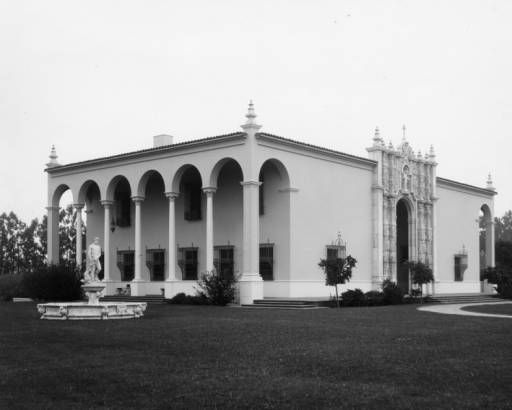
The seminary's library

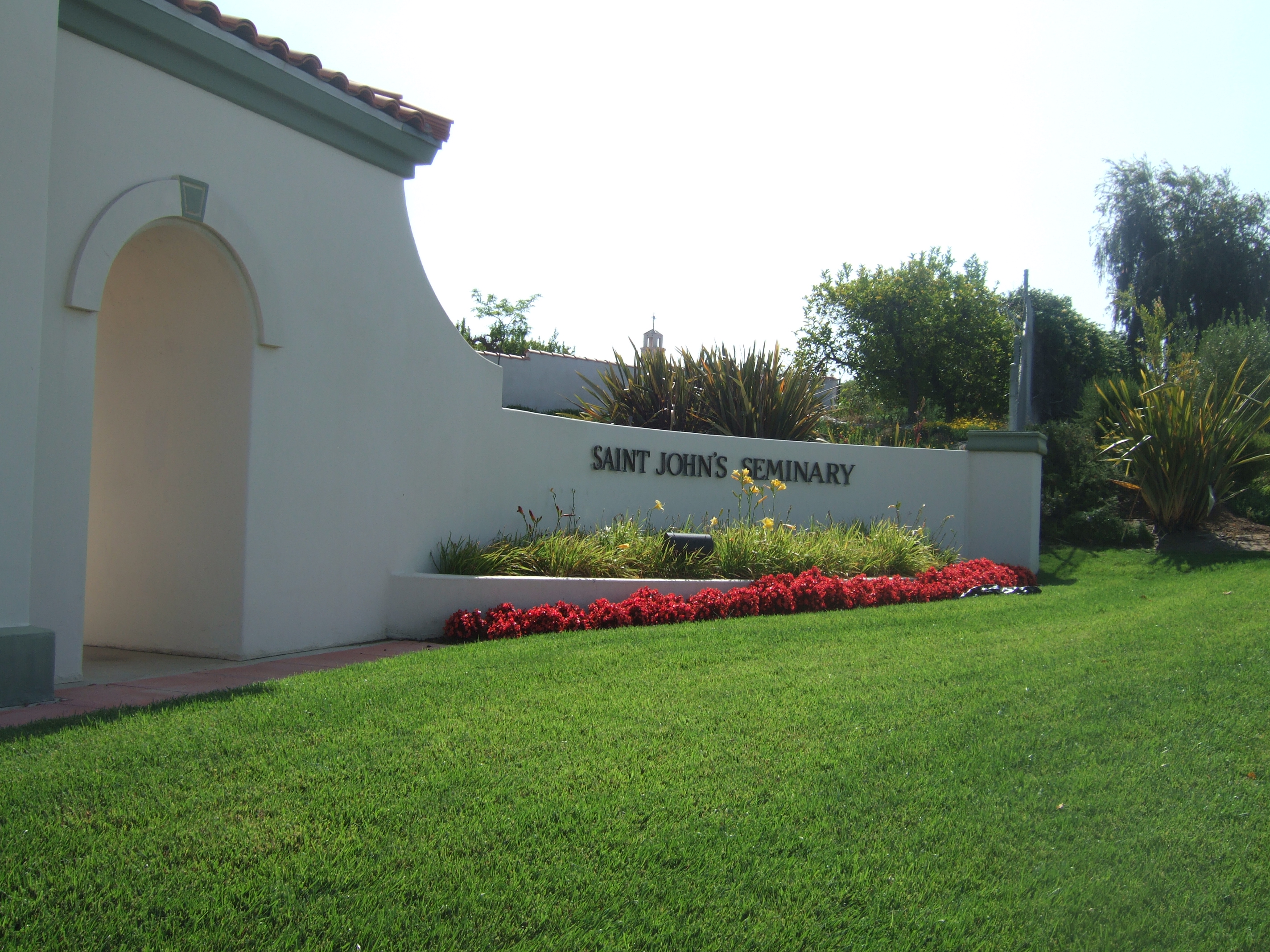
The entrance to St. John's Seminary

Juan Camarillo Jr. donated 100 acres (40 ha) of land from his Rancho Calleguas on March 3, 1927, with the specific desire to have the land used for a seminary named for St. John the Evangelist. On January 14, 1938, John J. Cantwell announced the planned construction of the seminary. St. John's Seminary began teaching seminarians on September 12, 1939. The administration was entrusted to the Vincentian Fathers. The Association of Theological Schools in the United States and Canada first accredited St. John's in 1976; it had previously been accredited by the American Association of Theological Schools and the Western Association of Schools and Colleges.

Beginning in 1961, St. John's granted bachelor's degrees through its subsidiary St. John's Seminary College. Following a 2002 report from a task force appointed by Roger Mahony, the Archdiocese of Los Angeles closed the undergraduate portion of the seminary. Only 12 seminarians graduated in 2002, and the Archdiocese chose to focus solely on graduate training. The task force also scheduled a 2005 review to see if St. John's should be entirely closed with Loyola Marymount University taking over the school's functions; this shutdown has not come to pass. The diocese agreed to sell most of the seminary's land, including the area used for undergraduate study, in 2004, for a price which was dependent on the sort of zoning approval the land would receive. The seminary now seeks to become self-sufficient rather than relying on the archdiocese's funding. Toward that end, they are seeking to have an area formerly used as an undergraduate campus developed into between 270 and 290 houses for people 55 and older.

== Library ==
The campus of St. John's has two libraries: the Edward Laurence Doheny Memorial Library and the Carrie Estelle Doheny Memorial Library, named for an oil tycoon and his wife who were noted Roman Catholic philanthropists. The Edward L. Doheny Library, inspired by the Cathedral of Mexico City, houses the seminary's collection of theological books, periodicals, and audiovisual materials, as well as the Seminary Board Room and other meeting spaces. The Carrie E. Doheny Library was the library of the undergraduate program until it was discontinued in 2002; since then it has been used to house the seminary's philosophy books as well as offices and classroom space.

For nearly half a century, the Edward L. Doheny Library also housed the collection of rare books and other treasures (including a Gutenberg Bible) donated to the seminary by Carrie Estelle Doheny in 1940. The Gutenberg's history and its path to and from the seminary is chronicled in "The Lost Gutenberg" by Margaret Leslie Davis (NY: TarcherPerigee, 2019). The collection was sold at auction in 1987 in order to fund the Doheny Endowment to support seminary functions.

== Academics ==
St. John's offers the Master of Divinity degree as a first professional degree for seminarians. If interested in theological studies and research, eligible seminarians can also concurrently earn a Master of Arts. The seminary offers a Master of Arts in Pastoral Ministry for non-seminarians who are interested in lay ministry.

== Sexual abuse scandal ==
Accusations of St. John alumni having molested boys and young men were part of a sexual abuse scandal which broke into public in the late 20th century. Of the approximately 625 St. John's graduates to be ordained by the Los Angeles Archdiocese between 1950 and 2005, by 2005 65 had been accused in the scandal, reflecting a rate higher than what studies have found for U.S. priests in general. A seminary spokesman noted in November 2005 that California had extended its statute of limitations on molestation lawsuits, making more cases possible for prosecution. He suggested that a wave of publicity on molestation by priests had made St. John's graduates targets of such accusations. Four days later, the Los Angeles Times ran a letter to the editor from St. John's rector, Helmut A. Hefner. He said that substantial reforms had been implemented in the seminary in terms of recruitment and assessment of students. He noted that changes had been made; as a result, from 1985 to 2005, only two of the 155 priests ordained at St. John's Seminary for the Los Angeles archdiocese had been accused of sexual misconduct.

== Notable alumni ==
- Tod Brown, Bishop of Orange
- Cyprian Consiglio, O.S.B. Cam., Prior of New Camaldoli Hermitage
- William DuBay, ordained in 1960, but left the priesthood after challenging Cardinal McIntyre on race relations and other matters.
- Geoff Farrow, priest relieved of his congregation after denouncing California Proposition 8 from the pulpit
- Cirilo Flores, Bishop of San Diego.
- Gustavo García-Siller, archbishop of San Antonio.
- William Robert Johnson, Bishop of Orange
- William Levada, Prefect of the Congregation of the Doctrine of the Faith
- Roger Mahony, Archbishop of Los Angeles
- George Niederauer, Archbishop of San Francisco
- Chris Ponnet, hospital chaplain, and social justice activist in Los Angeles
- Justin Rigali, Archbishop of Philadelphia
- Alexander Salazar, Auxiliary Bishop of Los Angeles, resigned in 2018, and criminally convicted in August 2023 of lewd and lascivious acts with a child under 14 years
- Bishop Jaime Soto of the Diocese of Sacramento
- Msgr. Francis J. Weber, archivist of the Los Angeles Archdiocese, and biographer of Archbishop John Joseph Cantwell, Cardinal James Francis McIntyre, and Cardinal Timothy Manning

== See also ==
- List of Roman Catholic seminaries
