= List of schools in the Roman Catholic Archdiocese of Los Angeles =

This is a list of schools in the Roman Catholic Archdiocese of Los Angeles. The archdiocese spans three counties: Los Angeles, Ventura and Santa Barbara. Not all the schools listed are operated by the archdiocese. Some are operated by religious institutes such as the Jesuits or the Franciscans. There are five universities or colleges, and 51 high schools within the archdiocese.

As of 2020, the archdiocese has the country's largest Catholic school network.

== Universities and colleges ==
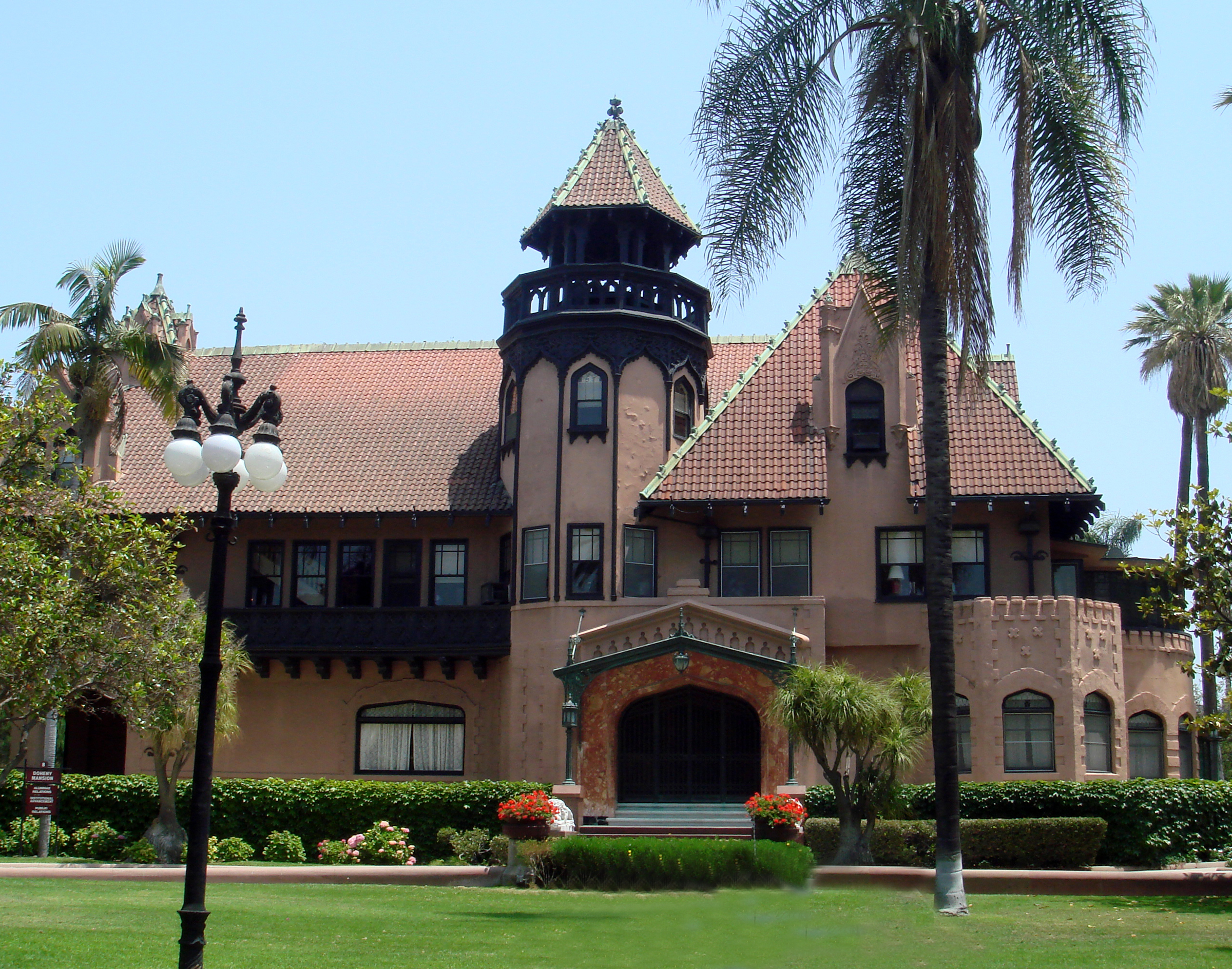
Mt. St. Mary's College, Los Angeles

=== Los Angeles County ===
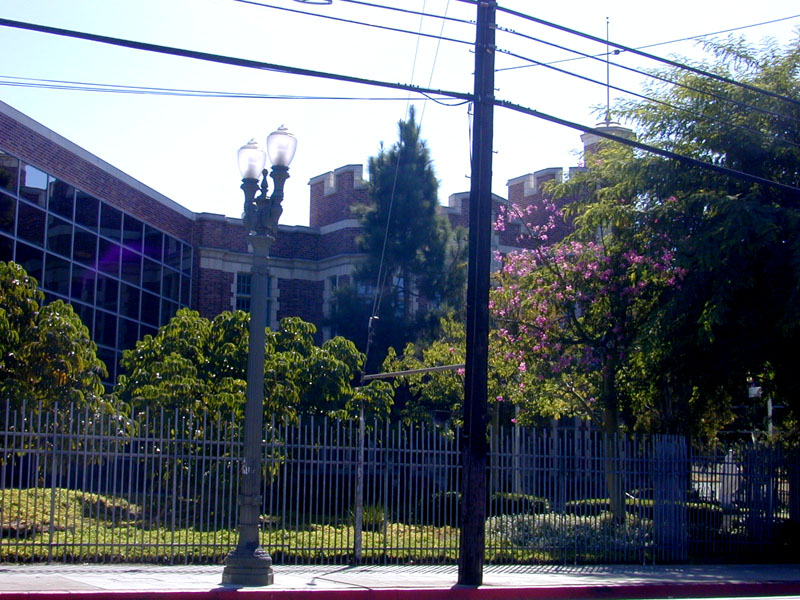
Bishop Conaty-Our Lady of Loretto High School, Los Angeles

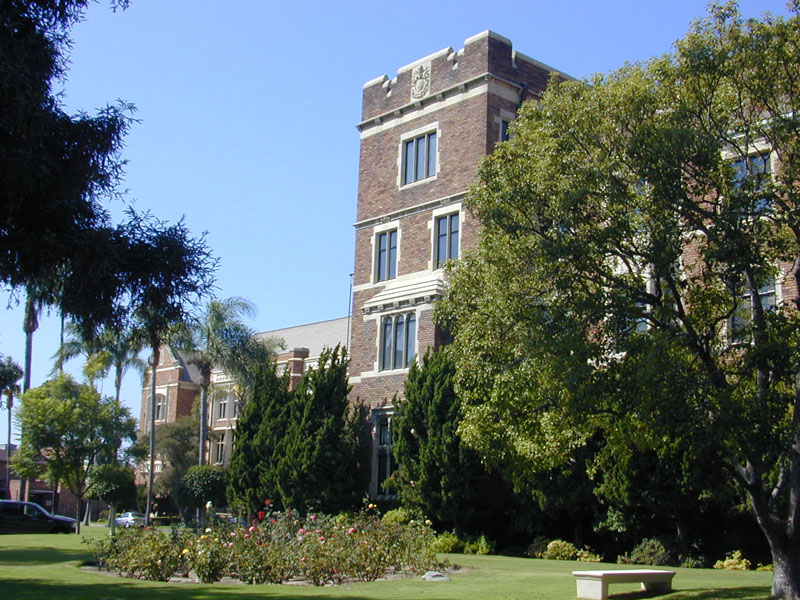
Loyola High School, Los Angeles

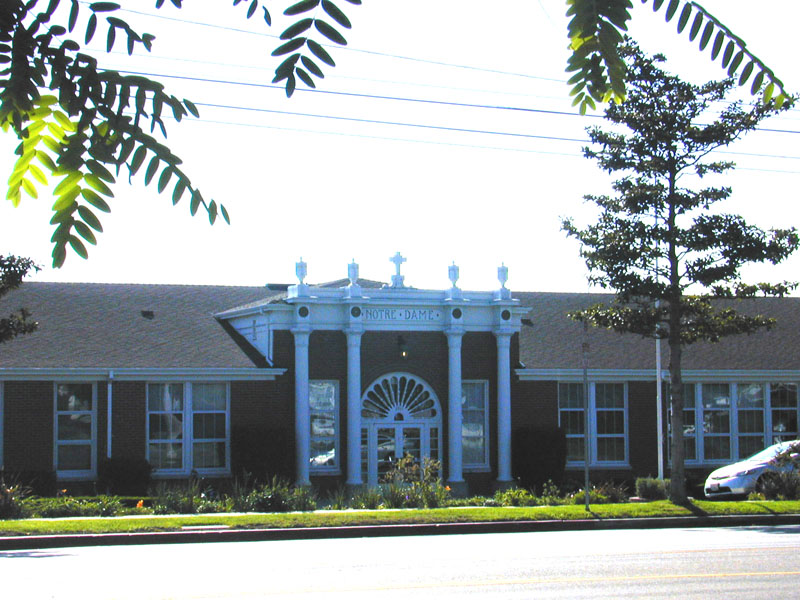
Notre Dame Academy, Los Angeles

- Loyola Marymount University, Los Angeles
- Mount St. Mary's College, Brentwood and North University Park campuses in Los Angeles

=== Ventura County ===
- St. John's Seminary, Camarillo
- Thomas Aquinas College, Santa Paula

== Schools in operation ==
=== High schools ===
==== Los Angeles County ====
===== City of Los Angeles =====
- Bishop Alemany High School, Mission Hills
- Bishop Conaty-Our Lady of Loretto High School (Girls), Harvard Heights
- Bishop Mora Salesian High School (Boys), Boyle Heights
- Cathedral High School (Boys), Elysian Park
- Chaminade College Preparatory School, West Hills
- Crespi Carmelite High School (Boys), Encino
- Louisville High School (Girls), Woodland Hills
- Loyola High School (Boys), Harvard Heights
- Immaculate Heart High School (Girls), Los Feliz
- Mary Star of the Sea High School, San Pedro
- Marymount High School (Girls), Bel-Air
- Notre Dame Academy (Girls), Rancho Park
- Notre Dame High School, Sherman Oaks
- Sacred Heart High School (Girls), Lincoln Heights
- St. Bernard High School, Playa del Rey
- St. Genevieve High School, Panorama City
- Verbum Dei Jesuit High School (Boys), Watts

===== Other cities =====
- Ramona Convent Secondary School (Girls), Alhambra
- St. John Bosco High School (Boys), Bellflower
- Providence High School, Burbank
- St. Pius X - St. Matthias Academy, Downey
- Junípero Serra High School, Gardena
- St. Mary's Academy (Girls), Inglewood
- Flintridge Sacred Heart Academy (Girls), La Cañada Flintridge
- St. Francis High School (Boys), La Cañada Flintridge
- Bishop Amat Memorial High School, La Puente
- Damien High School (Boys), La Verne, (previously Pomona Catholic Girls High School)
- St. Joseph High School (Girls), Lakewood
- Paraclete High School, Lancaster
- St. Anthony High School, Long Beach
- Cantwell-Sacred Heart of Mary High School, Montebello
- La Salle College Preparatory, Pasadena
- Mayfield Senior School of the Holy Child Jesus (Girls), Pasadena
- St. Monica Academy, Montrose
- Pomona Catholic High School (Girls), Pomona (previously Holy Name Academy)
- Don Bosco Technical Institute (Boys), Rosemead
- San Gabriel Mission High School (Girls), San Gabriel
- St. Paul High School, Santa Fe Springs
- St. Monica High School, Santa Monica
- Alverno Heights Academy (Girls), Sierra Madre (closed June 2023, now a K-8 co-ed school)
- Bishop Montgomery High School, Torrance

==== Santa Barbara County ====
- Bishop Garcia Diego, Santa Barbara
- St. Joseph, Santa Maria

==== Ventura County ====
- La Reina (Girls), Thousand Oaks
- Santa Clara, Oxnard
- St. Bonaventure, Ventura
- Villanova Preparatory, Ojai
- St. Augustine Academy, Ventura

=== Junior high schools ===
==== Los Angeles County ====
===== City of Los Angeles =====
- Chaminade College Preparatory, Chatsworth (6–8)
- Immaculate Heart (Girls), Los Feliz (6–8)
- La Reina School (Girls), Thousand Oaks (7–8)

=== PK–8 schools ===
==== City of Los Angeles ====
- Blessed Sacrament , Hollywood
- Our Lady of Grace , Encino
- Our Lady of Loretto , Echo Park
- Our Lady of Lourdes , Northridge
- Our Mother of Good Counsel
- Sacred Heart Elementary
- Saint Sebastian , West Los Angeles
- St. Timothy , West Los Angeles
- St. Genevieve Elementary , Panorama City
- St. Jane Frances de Chantal , North Hollywood
- Our Lady of Guadalupe Rose Hill{http://www.olgrhschool.org}, Los Angeles

==== Other cities ====
- Assumption of the Blessed Virgin Mary , Pasadena
- St. Mark Elementary , Venice
- Good Shepherd , Beverly Hills
- Holy Family Catholic School , South Pasadena
- St. Rose of Lima , Maywood
- St. Therese Carmelite , Alhambra
- St. Thomas More , Alhambra
- St. Matthias Elementary Huntington Park
- St. Margaret Mary Elementary*, Lomita
- St. Monica Catholic Elementary , Santa Monica

==== Ventura County ====
- Holy Cross , Ventura
- La Purisma Concepcion , Lompoc
- Our Lady of Guadalupe , Oxnard
- Our Lady of the Assumption , Ventura
- Sacred Heart , Ventura
- Saint Anthony's, Oxnard
- Santa Clara, Oxnard
- St. Mary Magdalen , Camarillo
- St. Sebastian, Santa Paula

==== Santa Barbara county ====
- St. Raphael

=== K–8 schools ===
==== Los Angeles County ====
===== City of Los Angeles =====
- Holy Spirit School
- Immaculate Heart of Mary School, East Hollywood
- St. Martin of Tours School , Brentwood
- St. Paul the Apostle, West Los Angeles
- Our Lady of Grace, Encino
- Our Lady of the Valley, Canoga Park
- St. Bridget of Sweden, Van Nuys
- St. Catherine of Siena, Reseda
- St. Cyril of Jerusalem, Encino
- St. Francis de Sales, Sherman Oaks
- St. Mel, Woodland Hills
- St. Elizabeth, Van Nuys
- St. Michael's , South Los Angeles
- St. Bernardine of Siena , Woodland Hills
- St. Joseph the Worker, Winnetka
- Santa Teresita
- Holy Name of Jesus
- St. Vincent
- St. Alphonsus School

===== Other cities =====
- All Souls World Language , Alhambra
- St. Therese Carmelite, Alhambra
- Incarnation Parish, Glendale
- St. Barnabas Parish , Long Beach
- St. Joseph Elementary , Pomona
- St. Anne Elementary , Santa Monica
- St. Jude the Apostle , Westlake Village
- St. Philip the Apostle , Pasadena
- Sts. Felicitas and Perpetua , San Marino
- Our Lady of Malibu . Malibu
- St. Mary Palmdale
- St. Christopher, West Covina

==== Ventura County ====
- St. Anthony, Oxnard
- St. Paschal Baylon, , Thousand Oaks

=== 1–8 schools ===
==== Los Angeles County ====
- Ramona Convent Elementary, Alhambra

==== Ventura County ====
- St. Rose of Lima , Simi Valley

== Closed schools ==
=== Universities and colleges ===
- Marymount California University, Rancho Palos Verdes (Closed in 2022)
- Our Lady Queen of Angels Seminary, Los Angeles (Closed in 1995)

=== High schools ===
- Bellarmine-Jefferson, Burbank (Closed 2018)
- Corvallis (Girls), Studio City (Closed 1987)
- Daniel Murphy (Boys), Los Angeles (Closed 2008) (previously St. John Vianney High School)
- Fermin Lasuen (Boys), San Pedro
- Holy Family(Girls), Glendale (Closed 2003)
- Holy Name (Girls), Pomona (Closed 1949) (reopened as Pomona Catholic High School)
- Los Angeles College, the junior seminary of the archdiocese
- Mount Carmel (Closed 1976)
- Our Lady Queen of Angels, Los Angeles (Closed 1982)
- Pater Noster, Los Angeles (Closed 1991)
- Pius X .Downey (merged with St. Mathias 1995)
- Notre Dame (Girls), Sunland (Closed 1960s)
- Queen of Angels Compton (Closed in 2002)
- Regina Caeli (Girls), Compton (renamed Queen of Angels 1995)
- St. Agatha's, Los Angeles
- St. Michael's (Girls), Los Angeles (merged with Regina Caeli 1995)
- Villa Cabrini (Girls), Burbank (Closed 1971)
