= San Fernando Pastoral Region =

Pastoral region of Los Angeles

The San Fernando Pastoral Region is a pastoral region of the Archdiocese of Los Angeles in the Roman Catholic Church. It covers the San Fernando, Santa Clarita, and Antelope Valleys in the State of California. This area includes neighborhoods in the City of Los Angeles along with other cities and towns. In 1986, Los Angeles Archbishop Roger Mahony divided the archdiocese into five pastoral regions to make church leaders more accessible to parishioners. This pastoral region is divided four deaneries.

As of 2024, the current regional auxiliary bishop is Bishop Albert Bahhuth. The pastoral region has 54 parishes, 12 high schools, 42 elementary schools and one Spanish mission. It does not contain any universities or colleges, The Catholic hospitals in this region are not operated by the archdiocese.

== Parishes ==
=== Deanery 5 ( Los Angeles) ===
Church name	Image	Address	LA neighborhood	School
Our Lady of Grace		5011 White Oak Ave. 34°09′43″N 118°31′07″W	Encino	K-8
Our Lady of Lourdes		18400 Kinzie St. 34°14′52″N 118°32′03″W	Northridge	TK-8
Our Lady of the Valley		22021 Gault St. 34°11′58″N 118°36′22″W	Canoga Park	K-8
St. Bernardine of Siena		24410 Calvert St. 34°10′57″N 118°39′24″W	Woodland Hills	K-8
St. Bridget of Sweden		16711 Gault St. 34°11′58″N 118°29′50″W	Van Nuys	K-8
St. Catherine of Siena		18115 Sherman Way; 34°12′05″N 118°31′41″W	Reseda	K-8
St. Cyril of Jerusalem		4601 Firmament Ave. 34°09′16″N 118°28′20″W	Encino	K-8
St. Euphrasia		11766 Shoshone Ave. 34°17′03″N 118°30′59″W	Granada Hills	K-8
St. Francis de Sales		13360 Valleyheart Dr. 34°09′00″N 118°25′28″W	Sherman Oaks	K-8
St. John Baptist de la Salle		16555 Chatsworth St. 34°15′54″N 118°29′35″W	Granada Hills	K-8
St. John Eudes		9901 Mason Ave. 34°15′01″N 118°34′48″W	Chatsworth	K-8
St. Joseph the Worker		19808 Cantlay St. 34°12′07″N 118°33′53″W	Canoga Park	K-8
St. Mel		20870 Ventura Blvd. 34°09′57″N 118°35′13″W	Woodland Hills	K-8

=== Deanery 6 (Los Angeles, Glendale and other communities) ===
Church name	Image	Address	Community or LA neighborhood	School
Cristo Rey		4343 Perlita Ave. 34°09′43″N 118°16′03″W	Los Angeles –Atwater Village	No
Divine Saviour-St. Ann Twin Parishes		Divine Saviour Church, 610 Cypress Ave. 34°05′19″N 118°13′21″W	Los Angeles –Cypress Park	K-8
		St. Ann Church, 2302 Riverdale Ave. 34°05′25″N 118°14′06″W	Los Angeles –Elysian Valley	No
Holy Family		209 E, Lomita Ave. 34°06′28″N 118°15′11″W	Glendale	K-8
Holy Redeemer/St. James the Less Parish		Holy Redeemer Church, 2411 Montrose Ave. 34°12′40″N 118°13′51″W	Montrose	K-8
		St. James the Less Church, 4625 Dunsmore Ave. 34°14′18″N 118°15′39″W	La Crescenta	
Holy Trinity		3722 Boyce Ave. 34°07′15″N 118°15′40″W	Los Angeles –Atwater Village	K-8
Incarnation		1001 N. Brand Blvd. 34°09′36″N 118°15′19″W	Glendale	K-8
Our Lady of Lourdes		10321 Tujunga Canyon Blvd. 34°12′40″N 118°13′51″W	Tujunga	K-8
St. Bede the Venerable		215 Foothill Blvd. 34°11′48″N 118°10′59″W	La Canada Flintridge	K-8
St. Bernard		2500 W. Ave. 33; 34°06′37″N 118°14′06″W	Los Angeles –Glassell Park	K-8
St. Dominic		2002 Merton Ave. 34°08′16″N 118°12′42″W	Los Angeles –Eagle Rock	K-8
St. Gregory the Illuminator (Armenian)		1510 E. Mountain St. 34°09′55″N 118°13′59″W	Glendale	No
St. Ignatius of Loyola		322 N. Ave. 61; 34°06′52″N 118°11′26″W	Los Angeles –Highland Park	K-8
St. Mary Coptic		2701 Newell St. 34°06′00″N 118°14′46″W	Los Angeles –Elysian Valley	No

=== Deanery 7 (Los Angeles, Burbank, North Hollywood and other communities) ===
Church name	Image	Address	Community or LA neighborhood	School
Guardian Angel		10886 Lehigh Ave. 34°16′05″N 118°24′54″W	Los Angeles –Pacoima	K-8
Jesus Sacred Heart (Antiochene Syrian)		10837 Collins St. 34°10′27″N 118°22′03″W	Los Angeles –North Hollywood	No
Our Lady of Peace		15444 Nordhoff St. 34°14′07″N 118°28′08″W	Los Angeles –North Hills	K-8
Our Lady of the Holy Rosary		7800 Vineland Ave. 34°12′46″N 118°22′11″W	Los Angeles – Sun Valley	K-8
Mary Immaculate		10390 Remick Ave. 34°15′32″N 118°26′05″W	Pacoima	K-8
Proto-Cathedral of St. Mary (Byzantine)		5329 Sepulveda Blvd. 34°10′02″N 118°28′00″W	Los Angeles –Sherman Oaks	No
Santa Rosa de Lima		668 S. Workman St. 34°16′58″N 118°27′00″W	San Fernando	K-8
St. Alphonsa			San Fernando	
St. Anne Melkite (Greek)		11211 Moorpark St. 34°09′02″N 118°22′32″W	Los Angeles –North Hollywood	No
St. Charles Borromeo		10828 Moorpark St. 34°09′00″N 118°21′58″W	Los Angeles –North Hollywood	K-8
St. Didacus		14339 Astoria St. 34°18′19″N 118°26′45″W	Los Angeles –Sylmar	K-8
St. Elizabeth		6635 Tobias Ave. 34°11′30″N 118°27′08″W	Los Angeles –Van Nuys	K-8
St. Ferdinand		1109 Coronel St. 34°16′54″N 118°26′37″W	San Fernando	No
St. Finbar		2010 W. Olive Ave. 34°09′51″N 118°19′33″W	Burbank	K-8
St. Francis Xavier		3801 Scott Rd. 34°12′37″N 118°20′13″W	Burbank	K-8
St. Genevieve		14061 Roscoe Blvd. 34°13′18″N 118°26′24″W	Los Angeles –Panorama City	K-8; 9-12
St. Jane Frances de Chantal		13001 Victory Blvd. 34°11′13″N 118°24′56″W	Los Angeles –North Hollywood	K-8
St. Patrick		6160 Cartwright Ave. 34°10′56″N 118°21′43″W	Los Angeles –North Hollywood	K-8
St. Paul Assyrian Chaldean		13050 Vanowen St. 34°11′37″N 118°25′04″W	Los Angeles –North Hollywood	No
St. Robert Bellarmine		133 North 5th St. 34°11′05″N 118°18′21″W	Los Angeles –Burbank	K-8
St. Vitus			San Fernando	

=== Deanery 8 (Palmdale, Santa Clarita and Lancaster) ===
Church name	Image	Address	Community	School
Our Lady of Perpetual Help		23233 W. Lyons Ave. 34°22′48″N 118°32′22″W	Santa Clarita –Newhall	K-8
Sacred Heart		45007 N. Cedar Ave. 34°42′00″N 118°08′24″W	Lancaster	K-8
St. Clare of Assisi		19606 Calla Way; 34°25′11″N 118°28′41″W	Santa Clarita –Canyon Country	No
St. Junipero Serra		6122 W. Azalea Dr. 34°38′59″N 118°14′21″W	Lancaster – Quartz Hill	No
St. Kateri Tekakwitha		22508 Copper Hill Dr. 34°27′36″N 118°31′52″W	Santa Clarita –Valencia	No
St. Mary		1600 E. Ave. R4; 34°34′07″N 118°06′04″W	Palmdale	K-8

== Spanish mission ==
Church name	Image	Address	Community
San Fernando Rey Mission		15151 San Fernando Mission Blvd. 34°16′23″N 118°27′40″W	Los Angeles – Mission Hills

== Monastery and retreat center ==
Church name	Image	Address	Community
St. Andrew's Abbey		31001 N. Valyermo Rd. 34°26′36″N 117°51′05″W	Valyermo
Holy Spirit Retreat Center		4316 Lanai Rd. 34°08′53″N 118°29′24″W	Los Angeles – Encino

== High schools ==
School name	Image	Address	Community
Bellarmine-Jefferson High School (closed)		465 East Olive Ave.	Burbank
Bishop Alemany High School		11111 North Alemany Dr.	Los Angeles – Mission Hills
Chaminade High School		7500 Chaminade Ave.	Los Angeles – West Hills
Crespi Carmelite High School		5031 Alonzo Ave.	Los Angeles –Encino
Flintridge-Sacred Heart Academy		440 Saint Katherine Dr.	La Cañada Flintridge
Holy Family High School		400 East Lomita Ave.	Glendale
Louisville High School		22300 Mulholland Dr.	Los Angeles –Woodland Hills
Notre Dame High School		13645 Riverside Dr.	Los Angeles –Sherman Oaks
Paraclete High School		42145 30th St. West	Lancaster
Providence High School		511 South Buena Vista St.	Burbank
St. Francis High School		200 Foothill Blvd.	La Cañada Flintridge
St. Genevieve High School		13967 Roscoe Blvd.	Los Angeles – Panorama City

== Elementary schools ==
Parish-affiliated elementary schools are noted above in the charts listing parishes. In addition to parish-affiliated elementary schools, there is one non-affiliated middle school in the San Fernando Pastoral Region.

- Chaminade Middle School, Chatsworth (Grades 6-8)

== Hospitals ==
As of 2017, the archdiocese no longer operates any hospitals. The Catholic hospitals in this pastoral region are operated by Dignity Health and Providence Health & Services, two non-profit health care organizations.

== Cemetery ==
Good Shepherd-Lancaster

Cemetery	Image	Address	Community
San Fernando Mission Cemetery		11160 Stranwood Ave. 34°16′29″N 118°27′53″W	San Fernando

== See also ==
- Roman Catholic Archdiocese of Los Angeles
  - Our Lady of the Angels Pastoral Region
  - San Gabriel Pastoral Region
  - San Pedro Pastoral Region
  - Santa Barbara Pastoral Region
- List of schools in the Roman Catholic Archdiocese of Los Angeles
