= Louisville High School =

Louisville High School may refer to:

- Louisville High School (California), Roman Catholic college preparatory high school for young women located in Los Angeles
- Louisville High School (Mississippi)
- Louisville High School (Nebraska)
- Louisville High School (Ohio), a public high school located in Louisville, Ohio, USA
