= Incarnation Catholic Church and School (Glendale, California) =

Incarnation Catholic Church
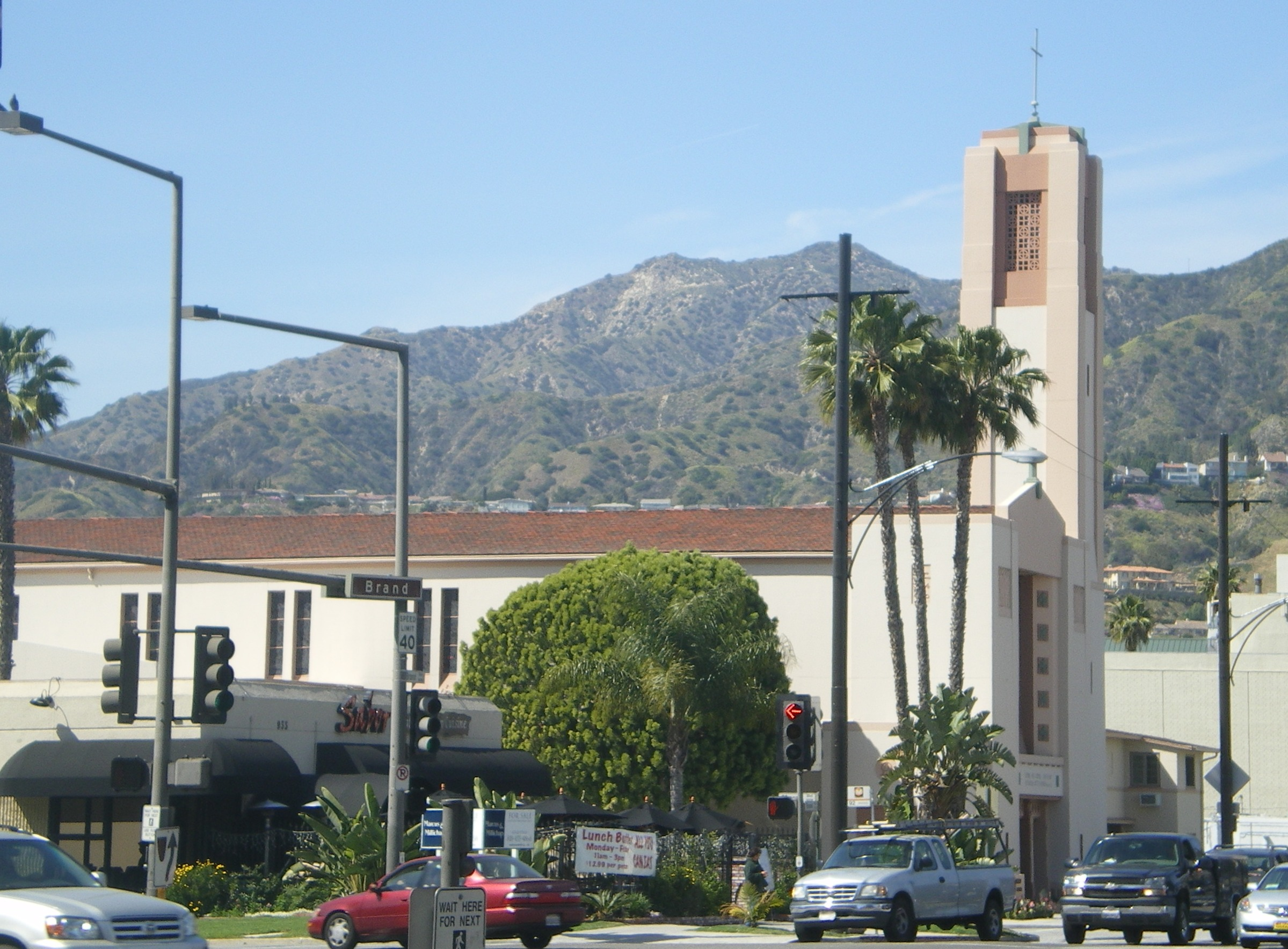
- Incarnation Catholic Church, Glendale
- Incarnation Catholic Church
- 34°9′36.2″N 118°15′19.44″W
- Country: United States
- Denomination: Catholic Church
- Website: incaglendale.org

Incarnation Catholic Church and School are a large Catholic church and elementary school located on North Brand Boulevard in Glendale, California. The parish was founded in 1927 and the school in 1937. The current church was completed in 1952.

== History ==
=== Early history ===
The parish was established in 1927 and was carved out of the existing parish of Holy Family Church. The first services were held in a private home on the site where the current church is situated. As the parish grew, services were moved to the American Legion Hall on West Arden. When Thomas O'Sullivan became pastor in 1928, he had a temporary church built on the site. The elementary school opened in 1937 under the administration of the Sisters of Charity of the Blessed Virgin Mary.

Michael Carvill served as pastor at Incarnation for forty years from 1932 to 1972. It was under Carvill's leadership that the current church was built in 1952. Cardinal Timothy Manning presided at Carvill's funeral in 1975. In 1970, Incarnation Church was the site of a Congress of the Legion of Mary, a Catholic lay organization.

Laurence O'Brien served as the pastor at Incarnation from 1972 to 1986, after which he remained at the parish as pastor emeritus. Cardinal Roger Mahony presided over Msgr. O'Brien's funeral in 1998. He was succeeded by Eugene Frilot who served as pastor from 1986 to 1999.

In May 1990, the funeral of Vic Tayback, the actor best known for his role as the gruff diner owner and short-order cook Mel on the long-running television series "Alice," was held at Incarnation Church.

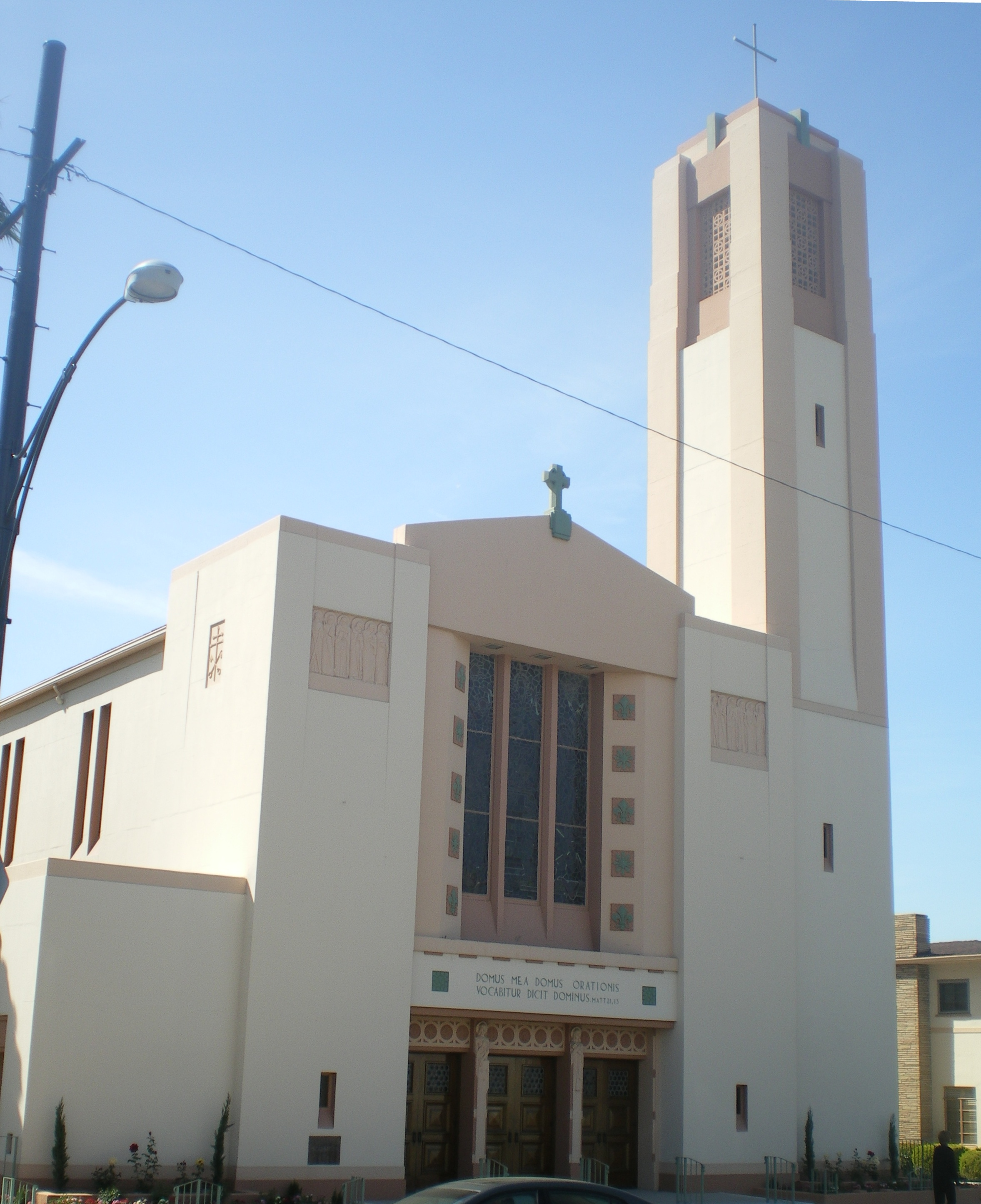
Front view of Incarnation

In early January 1991, The Los Angeles Times reported that Tilak Jayawardene, who was the associate pastor at Incarnation Church from 1987 until December 1990, had been charged with six counts of molestation of a minor. Jayawardene disappeared as the police investigated the charges. Incarnation's pastor, Frilot, said at the time that Jayawardene left the parish in early December, saying he had been recalled by his bishop overseas. Frilot told the press: "I haven't heard anything. He hasn't contacted me. I assume he went home to Sri Lanka." Eleven years later, in 2002, Jayawardene was found residing in Sri Lanka, and Glendale police asked the Los Angeles district attorney's office to seek extradition. Cardinal Mahony said at the time that he has written to church officials in Sri Lanka, requesting that they return Jayawardene to Los Angeles.

In 1993, a transient named Filiberto Maldonado, assaulted and attempted to rape a 73-year-old woman who was alone praying inside the sanctuary at the church. The man was later sentenced to eleven years in prison.

In June 1997, Incarnation was the site of two tragic and publicized funerals. The first was for Glendale Police Officer Charles "Chuck" Lazzaretto, a man who the Los Angeles Times reported "would have become chief had he not been ambushed by a gunman." Officer Lazzaretto was shot to death in a Chatsworth warehouse while investigating a domestic violence case. Lazzaretto's funeral was attended by police officers from across California, and presided over by Cardinal Roger Mahony.

Later that same month, the funeral of a 17-year-old high school senior, Julius Riofrir, was held at Incarnation. According to the Los Angeles Times, the youth died when a baseball that ricocheted off the side of a batting cage and struck him in the head during a pregame warmup for his American Legion team. The paper reported that 500 people attended the ceremony at Incarnation.

=== Recent history ===
Paul James Hruby became pastor in 1999. Hruby was baptized at Incarnation Church in 1956 and grew up in Glendale.

In July 1999, Frank Lubin, captain of the 1936 Gold Medal-winning U.S. Olympic basketball team and Incarnation church member died. The funeral was at Incarnation on July 13, 1999.

The Incarnation parish has played a role in attempting to heal ethnic tensions in a community with large Armenian-American and Hispanic populations. In May 2000, a 17-year-old Hispanic youth, Raul Aguirre, was killed trying to stop a fight between a Hispanic friend and two Armenian American teenagers. Aguirre, a high school senior who had planned to join the Marine Corps, was beaten in the head with a tire iron and stabbed several times. Shortly after Aguirre's death, a group of Latinos fired into a crowd of young Armenian American men gathered in front of a Glendale doughnut shop, and fears grew of a street war between Armenian and Hispanic youths. Nearly 1,000 people filled the Incarnation church for Aguirre's funeral. With tensions still high, at least 15 police officers patrolled the church and grounds during the ceremony. Hruby, in his sermon, sought to heal the ethnic divisions, stating: "I have to believe if Raul could stand up here today he would say violence is not the answer. We are not only Latino and Armenian, white and Asian, black and Middle Eastern. We are instruments of peace and we are called to be counter-cultural and to love and be loved by all." A Marine Corps color guard escorted the casket out of the sanctuary and to Forest Lawn cemetery for burial. The Los Angeles Times reported on the ceremony as follows: "People of all types came to say goodbye to Aguirre on Friday. . . . There were old people, wailing babies, families and city officials sweating in their suits. The church was filled beyond capacity and although the crowd was mostly Latino, there were several Armenian Americans who came to pay respects."

In 2002, Incarnation celebrated its 75th anniversary with a weekend of events including a mass concelebrated with Cardinal Roger Mahony.

On July 30, 2006, Incarnation Parish purchased the property of the nearby North Glendale Methodist Church. The Methodist congregation dwindled over the years and merged with the United Central Methodist Church of Glendale. An offer was made to sell the property to Incarnation in a bid to keep the site in Christian ministry.

This acquisition included a chapel, a gym, a professional kitchen, room for a preschool and a large education building along with outdoor recreation facilities, meeting rooms, and ministry offices. Improvement of the campus required over three years and $300,000 in safety and structural renovations. Incarnation now has significantly greater space for its growing ministries. The newly dubbed "Incarnation Community Center" was rechristened in September 2009, and at the same time, the parish opened a certified preschool.[1]

In March 2011, longtime Glendale resident, and 50 year parishioner, Howard J. Thelin passed on at age 90. Services were held at Incarnation, officiated by Paul Hruby, to guests of approximately 200. Thelin had been the former assemblyman for the Glendale district in the mid '50s to mid '60s, and was a retired Superior Court Justice. Hruby, who had left Incarnation in 2010, was gracious to give a stirring eulogy for the longtime parishioner, and left a lasting impression upon all who attended the service.

== See also ==
- San Fernando Pastoral Region
