= St. Finbar Catholic Church and School (Burbank, California) =

Catholic Church in California, USA

Coordinates: 34.1641°N 118.3257°W

St. Finbar Catholic Church
- St. Finbar Catholic Church and School
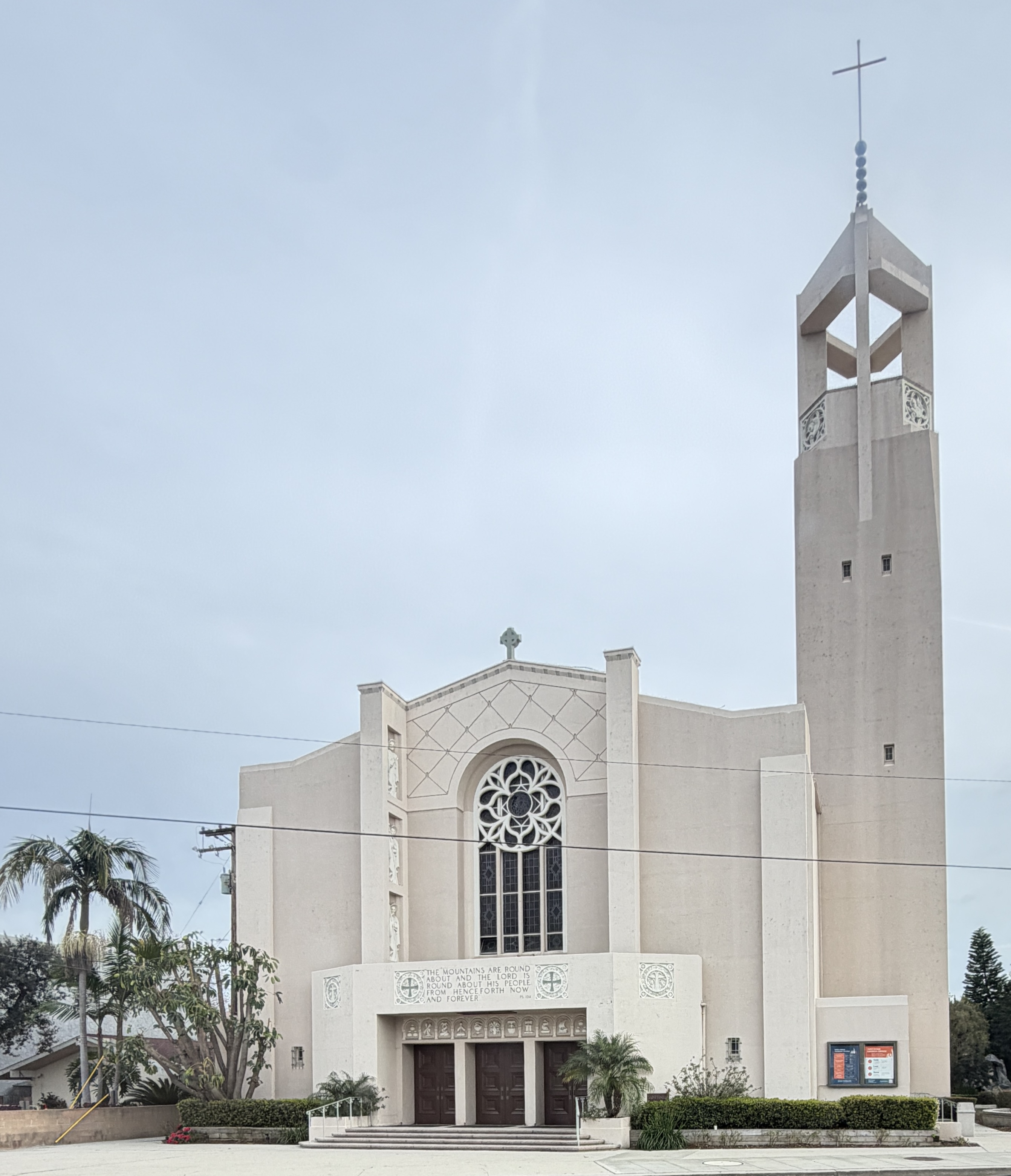
- St. Finbar, Burbank (February 2026)
- St. Finbar Catholic Church
- Address: 2010 W Olive Ave, Burbank, CA 91506
- Country: United States
- Denomination: Catholicism
- Website: stfinbarburbank.org

History
- Founded: Early 1950s

St. Finbar Catholic Church and School is a Catholic church and elementary school on Olive Avenue in Burbank, California. It is the largest Catholic parish in Burbank. St. Finbar gained notoriety for its innovations in adapting to its multiethnic community, offering Vietnamese-language Masses to a wave of immigrants from Vietnam in 1975.

== Early history ==
Formed in 1938, the parish built a temporary church in 1940. The current church was built in the early 1950s. In 1945, the elementary school opened under the administration of seven sisters from the Sisters of Providence. By 1952, the enrollment of the school had grown to 670 students. The first lay principal was hired in 1969, and the last two Sisters of Providence left the staff in 1984.

== Changing demographics ==
St. Finbar serves a community that has been a microcosm of the greater Los Angeles area. Located one mile from The Walt Disney Company's corporate headquarters and the former NBC Studios, St. Finbar served an overwhelmingly Anglo community for many years. The parish changed beginning in the 1970s and accelerating during the 1980s into an increasingly multiethnic community with many of the problems of a large urban area. By 2000, Burbank's population had reached 100,316 people.

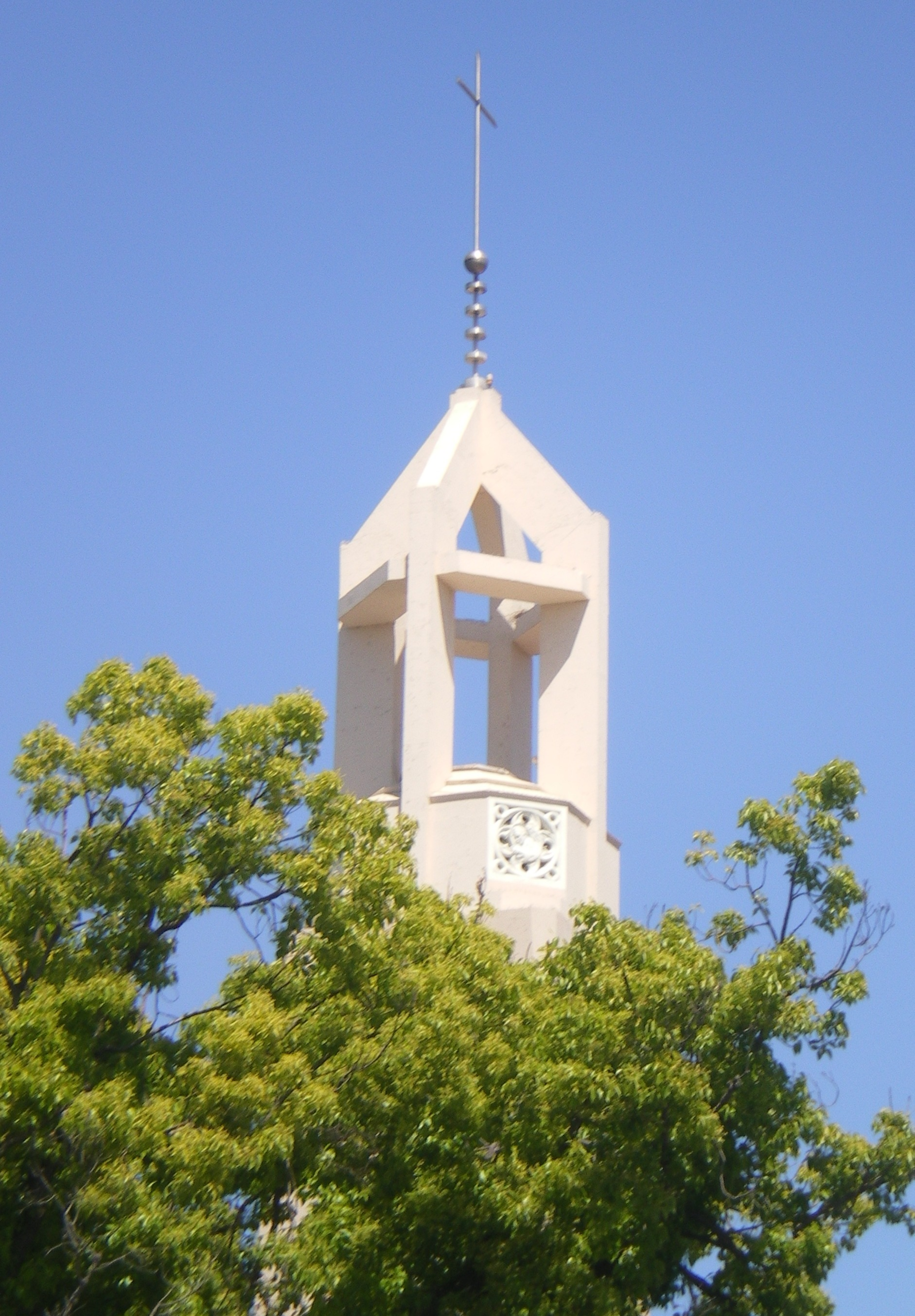
Steeple of St. Finbar

As Vietnamese refugees began moving into the Burbank and Santa Ana areas in 1975, St. Finbar and a parish in Orange County drew media attention when they jointly brought in Vietnamese redemptionist priest Rev. Tran Ngoc Bich to provide services for Vietnamese immigrants. Father Bich heard confessions in Vietnamese preceding Masses in that language at the St. Finbar Parish Hall and at St. Barbara's in Santa Ana.

By 1990, St. Finbar was described by the Los Angeles Times as a "thriving" parish and a local "landmark"—the largest parish in Burbank with 3,600 registered member families. Believing there may be thousands of unregistered Catholics in the parish, and concerned that some may be elderly or infirm, St. Finbar's pastor, Father Robert Howard declared 1990 a "year of evangelization" and sent 200 volunteers door-to-door conducting a Catholic "census" across the parish's 17-square-mile (44 km^{2}) territory. The census-takers carried questionnaires across the community during Holy Week, asking residents a series of questions about their religion, including whether they had been baptized and confirmed.

== Experimentation with Spanish-language Mass ==
In July 1993, the Los Angeles Times published a 2,200-word profile of St. Finbar's titled, "Parish Mirrors Burbank's New Ethnic Makeup." The article discussed St. Finbar's efforts to adapt to its changing demographics. In particular, St. Finbar had launched an experiment by offering Mass in Spanish. The Times noted that the experiment was a success: "When Mass is celebrated in English, the pews of St. Finbar are never full. Although a dwindling flock faithfully attends, the church is never even half full - until it is time for the Spanish Mass. Then the drought ends and the flood begins. Every Sunday, hundreds of Latinos make their way to the Catholic community of St. Finbar in Burbank, filling every seat, using every hymnbook."

The program met with resistance from some English-speaking parishioners, who felt "as though they were being outnumbered," according to St. Finbar's pastor. Father Howard described the backlash to the Spanish Mass: "It was a long time in coming, and it was painful because we knew that we would hurt some of the good, solid families that have been here. Some, I'm sad to say, will leave the parish. But the archbishop once said, 'It's amazing, if we're going to be together in heaven, why can't we live together here on earth?'"

One of the oldest members of the parish, Ray Halbur, recalled that when the parish's first church was built, "it was 98% white." Halbur noted that, as the church's population began to change, the white parishioners "either moved or passed away." Halbur said that, as of 1993, "there aren't too many of the original families still there." Haber noted that some of the remaining Anglo members felt that "Latinos are taking over the church," and that the parish "caters more to them." Unlike many, Halbur accepted the change, saying: "Overall, everybody has accepted the way it has changed. Naturally, there is always some dissension. I had some. It's just something you have to accept. You can't turn them away. That's not the Catholic tradition."

The experiment at St. Finbar was the subject of a study by a pastoral committee in 1993. Since 1993, numerous parishes with large Latino communities in Southern California (and across the United States) have followed St. Finbar's example, and are now offering Spanish-language Masses.

== See also ==
- San Fernando Pastoral Region
- St. Robert Bellarmine Catholic Church
- St. Charles Borromeo Church (North Hollywood)
