= St. Elisabeth of Hungary Church and School =

Catholic Church in California, USA

Coordinates: 34.190919°N 118.452823°W

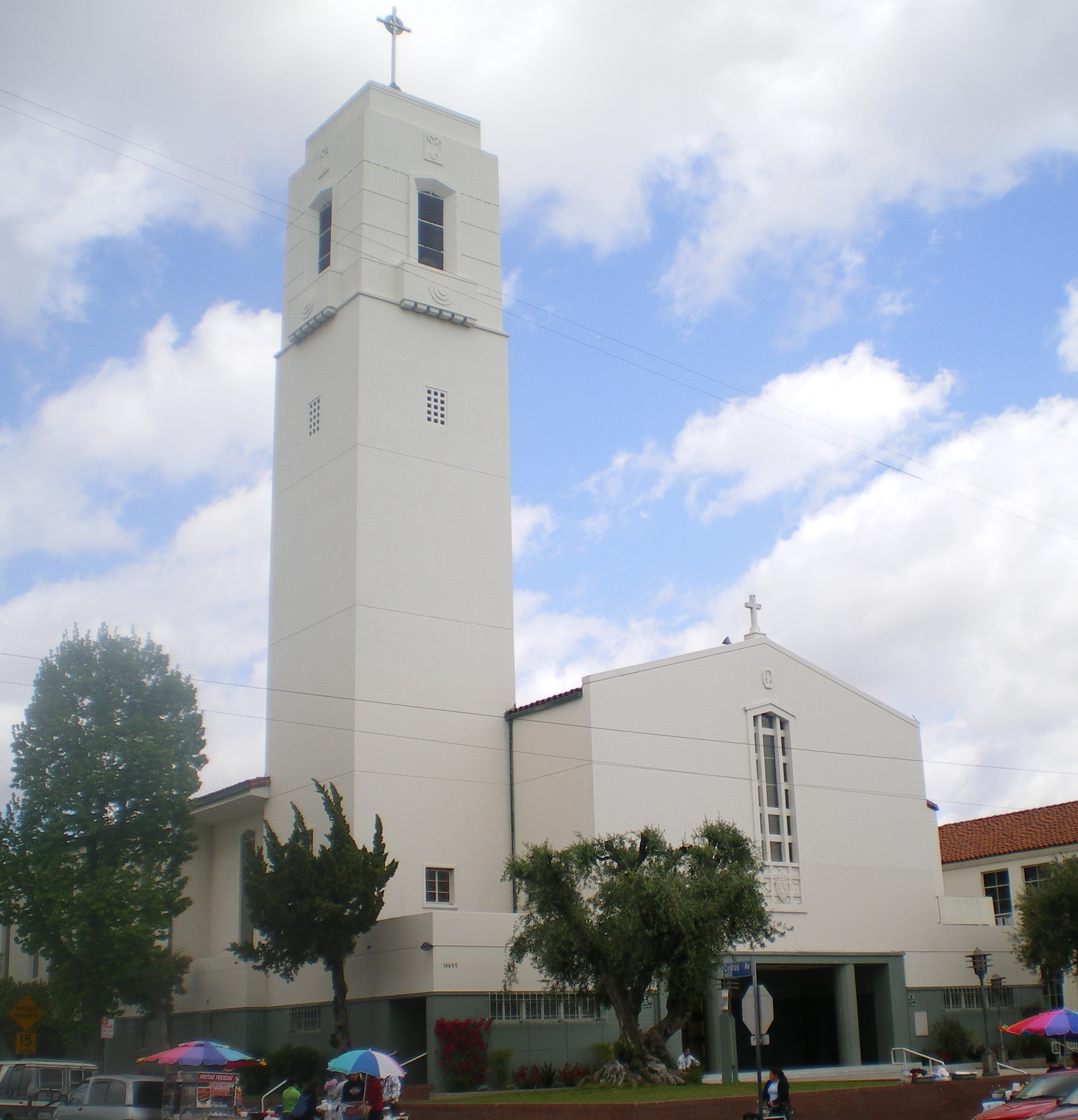
St. Elisabeth Church

St. Elisabeth of Hungary Church and School, originally known as St. Elizabeth Church and School, is a Catholic church and elementary school located in Van Nuys, Los Angeles, California. The church and school are named in honor of Elizabeth of Hungary.

Founded in 1919, it is the oldest Roman Catholic parish in the central San Fernando Valley. The current church building was dedicated in 1950.

The church gained some notoriety as part of the sexual abuse scandal in the Catholic archdiocese of Los Angeles after Father Michael Baker was reassigned to the parish from 1987 to 1991. Since 2023, the church has been led by its eleventh pastor, Rogationist priest Father Shinto Sebastian.

== History ==
=== Early history ===
The parish of St. Elisabeth was founded in 1918 as a mission of the Holy Trinity Church (now known as St. Robert Bellarmine) in Burbank. Rev. Victor M. Egas was the first pastor. When he arrived in 1919, the central San Fernando Valley had no Catholic church and no priest's residence. He organized the parish which began with 103 families. He also supervised the construction of a church building. The new church building was designed by D. Piepenstock. A ceremony of benediction was held for the laying of the cornerstone in November 1919.

The church was dedicated on March 14, 1920. Bishop John Joseph Cantwell officiated at the ceremony and consecrated the new church.

Rev. C.A. Kimmons took over as pastor at the end of 1920. Kimmons was reassigned in March 1924.

Rev. Edmond Keohan, a native of County Waterford, Ireland, was the pastor from 1924 until his death in April 1947.

=== Construction of new church ===
In May 1947, the Rev. Patrick Francis O'Dwyer, a native of County Tipperary, Ireland, was appointed as the pastor at St. Elizabeth. O'Dwyer was credited with overseeing a dramatic expansion of the parish, including construction of a new church building, convent, and social hall, and the expansion of the school.

Construction of the new church began in early 1949. The building was constructed with reinforced concrete, structural steel roof framing, and a tile roof. The design was described as "a restrained modern style." The church was designed by architect George J. Adams with assistance from Armet and Davis.

Services were first held in the new church prior to Christmas 1949, though the formal dedication did not occur until November 1950. Archbishop James Francis McIntyre and Bishop Timothy Manning officiated at the dedication.

At the time of its dedication, St. Elizabeth's was the largest church in the San Fernando Valley.

Father O'Dwyer, later elevated to monsignor, remained as the pastor at St. Elizabeth's for nearly 25 years until his death in January 1971.

=== Child sexual abuse scandal ===
In 2002, the Los Angeles Times published a front-page story revealing Father Michael Baker's serial sexual abuse of boys. Baker met with Archbishop Roger Mahony in December 1986 and confessed to having had sexual contact with children. After his confession, Baker was temporarily assigned to St. Elisabeth, a parish with a school serving children from kindergarten to the eighth grade, in the summer of 1987 and then on a full-time basis from 1988 to 1991. The reassignment was conditioned on a Baker having no contact with minors. The archdiocese learned in February 1989 that Baker was counseling a young boy in violation of the restriction. A St. Elisabeth's student later came forward stating that he was repeatedly molested by Father Baker from 1989 to 1992. In addition, a former St. Elisabeth altar boy filed suit against the archdiocese in 2002 alleging that he was sexually abused by Father Baker beginning in 1990 when he was 12 years old.

Mahony later apologized and assumed full responsibility for allowing Baker to remain in the ministry.

=== Recent history ===
In 2001, the Rogationist Fathers began the direction of St. Elisabeth Parish.

On February 22, 2019, the heart of St. John Vianney visited St. Elisabeth's as part of the "Heart of a Priest" relic tour.

St. Elisabeth Catholic School

Information
- Religious affiliation: Catholicism
- Established: September 11, 1928; 97 years ago
- Founders: Sisters of Providence of Saint Mary-of-the-Woods
- Grades: TK-8

== School ==
St. Elisabeth Catholic School was founded by the Sisters of Providence of Saint Mary-of-the-Woods, Indiana. The school opened on September 11, 1928. The original school was a two-story building with four classes and an auditorium.

The school, serving students from transitional kindergarten through the eighth grade, celebrated its 90th anniversary in September 2018.

=== Alumni ===
Actress/comedian Julie Brown is an alumna of St. Elisabeth.

== Pastors ==
- Rev. Victor M. Egas, 1919–1920
- Rev. C.A. Kimmons, 1920–1924
- Rev. Edmond Keohan, 1924–1947
- Msgr. Patrick Francis O'Dwyer, 1947–1971
- Msgr. William Duggan, 1971–1987
- Msgr. Timothy Dyer, 1987–1991 (administrator 1987–1989, pastor 1990–1991)
- Rev. Paul J. Hruby, 1991–1997
- Rev. Kevin Dolan, 1997–2001
- Rev. John Bruno, 2001–2015
- Rev. Vito DiMarzio, 2015–2023
- Rev. Shinto Sebastian, 2023-present

== See also ==
- San Fernando Pastoral Region
