= Rogationists =

Italian religious congregation

- Rogationists of the Heart of Jesus
- Congregatio Rogationistarum a Corde Iesu
- Abbreviation: RCJ
- Formation: 16 May 1897 (128 years ago)
- Founder: Hannibal Mary Di Francia, RCJ
- Founded at: Italy
- Type: Clerical religious congregation of pontifical right (for men)
- Headquarters: Rome, Italy
- Members: 587 (373 priests) (2018)
- Superior General: Bruno Rampazzo, RCJ
- Website: rcj.org

The Rogationists of the Heart of Jesus (Italian: Rogazionisti del Cuore di Gesù; Latin: Congregatio Rogationistarum a Corde Iesu; abbreviated RCJ) is a religious congregation of priests and brothers founded by St. Hannibal Mary Di Francia (1851–1927) on May 16, 1897. The word rogationist comes from the Latin rogate which means "pray".

The spirituality of the congregation is centered on the words of Jesus Christ in the Gospels: "The harvest is rich but the workers are few. Pray, therefore, to the Lord of the harvest that He may send workers into His harvest" (Matthew 9:37–38; Luke 10:2).

Hence, they carry out the mission of:

praying for vocations to the priestly and consecrated life in the Church and propagating this prayer worldwide.
caring and promoting the human and spiritual welfare of orphans, needy children and the poor.

== Rogationists of the Heart of Jesus ==
The Congregation of the Rogationists originated in Italy and spread to several other countries in Europe, United States, Mexico, Paraguay, Colombia, Brazil, Argentina, Rwanda, India and the Philippines, among others. In the United States the Rogationists established their first community in 1967 assuming parish work in Mendota, California. At present, there are three Rogationist communities in California. Their houses are in Sanger, Van Nuys and in North Hollywood.

== Vocation and apostolate ==
As an expression of their charism, the Rogationists dedicate their lives in the apostolate in favor of the poor. In various places throughout the world, the Congregation has established orphanages, health and nutrition centers, schools for the deaf and dumb, technical-vocational schools, scholarship programs for poor children, centers for professional management, centers for relief and assistance, parishes and oratories

"I feel a bond of holy friendship with everyone on earth either of my religion or another, rich or poor, employer or worker, humble and needy people or high aristocracy. I have seen a brother and my Lord in everyone of them. The most beautiful things I have desired for me in this life and the next, I have desired equally for all."

-St. Hannibal Di Francia

=== Fr. Hannibal House (social service center) ===
Fr. Hannibal House is a non-profit Catholic organization provides emergency help to people in need, regardless of race, religion or national origin. It provides the people of Sanger and the neighboring communities emergency assistance such as: food, clothing, medicine, limited rent and utilities assistance, overnight lodging, gasoline etc.

Fr. Hannibal House operates under the guidelines established by the Board of Directors.

The support for Fr. Hannibal House comes from the community organizations and churches, St. Mary's Parish of Sanger, the City of Sanger, United Way, County of Fresno, the Federal Emergency Management Agency (FEMA), local merchants, St. Vincent de Paul Society of Sanger, the Rogationist Charities and from various donors and benefactors

== See also ==
- St. Elizabeth Church and School (Van Nuys)
