= Our Lady of the Valley =

Church in Los Angeles, California, US

Coordinates: 34.19947°N 118.60637°W

- Our Lady of The Valley Roman Catholic Church
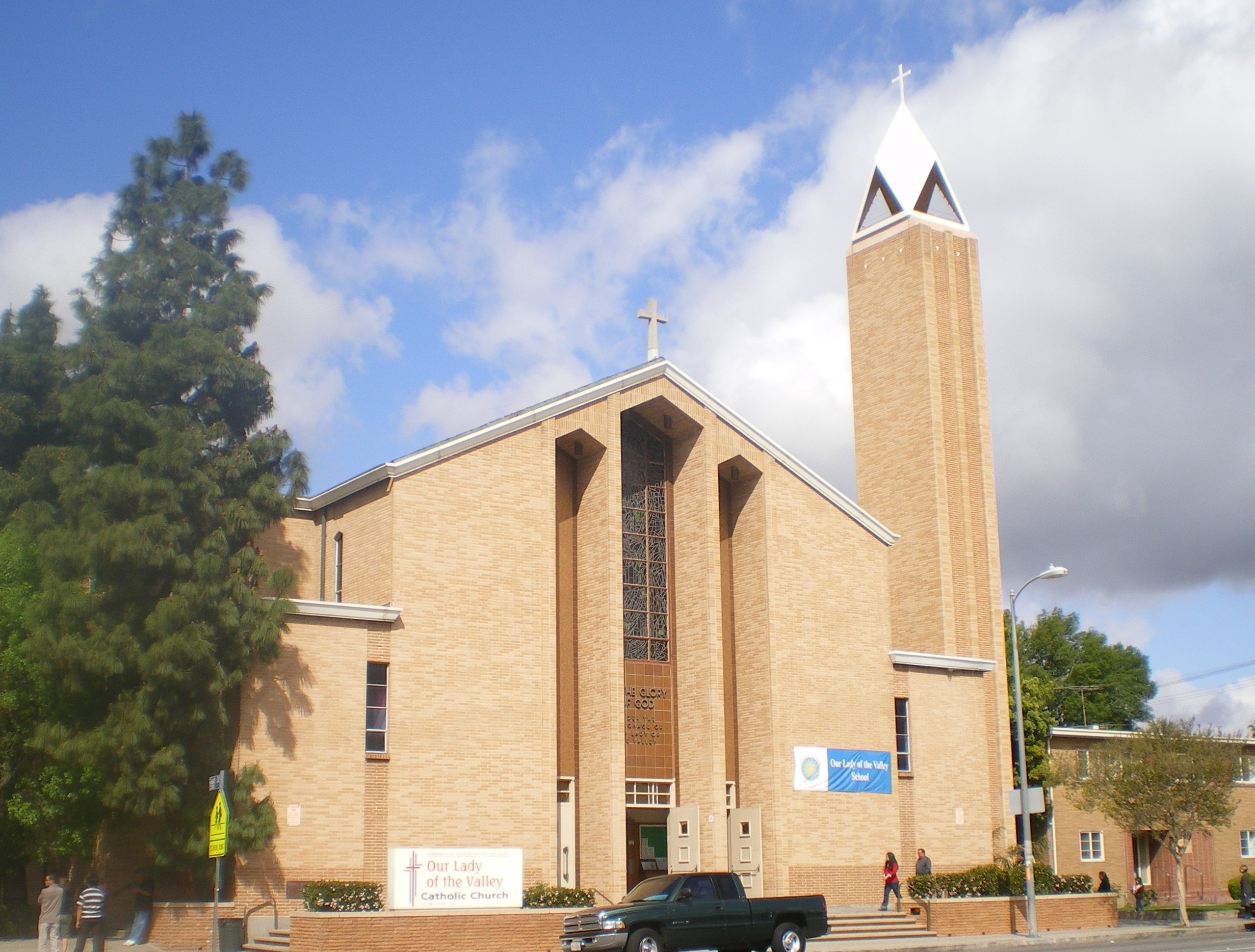
- Our Lady of the Valley church in 2008
- Our Lady of the Valley
- Address: 22041 Gault St. Canoga Park, CA 91303
- Denomination: Roman Catholic
- Website: ourladyofthevalley.org

Administration
- Archdiocese: Los Angeles

Our Lady of the Valley is a large Catholic church and school located in the Canoga Park section of Los Angeles, California. Founded in 1921 when the area was sparsely populated, and most of the 620 parishioners were involved in agriculture with livestock or walnut and orange groves. The shrine is dedicated to the Blessed Virgin Mary as Patroness of the San Fernando Valley.

At the time of its formation, the parish's boundaries covered 400 square miles (1,000 km^{2}) from the Pacific Ocean to the south, the Ventura County line to the west, White Oak Avenue to the east, and the Santa Susana Mountains to the north. In the years after World War II, the San Fernando Valley shifted from agriculture to residential communities, and the Catholic population also swelled. The 400 square miles (1,000 km^{2}) served by Our Lady of the Valley were carved up among nine sister parishes. Though its territory has been reduced to four square miles, the parish has grown from 620 parishioners to over 4100 families.

Monsignor John J. Hurley was pastor at Our Lady of the Valley from 1943 until 1975.

The church sustained $800,000 in damage in the 1994 Northridge earthquake. It was renovated and reopened in November 1995.

== See also ==
- San Fernando Pastoral Region
