= St. Mel (Woodland Hills, California) =

Catholic church and elementary school in Woodland Hills, Los Angeles, California

Coordinates: 34°9′57″N 118°35′14″W

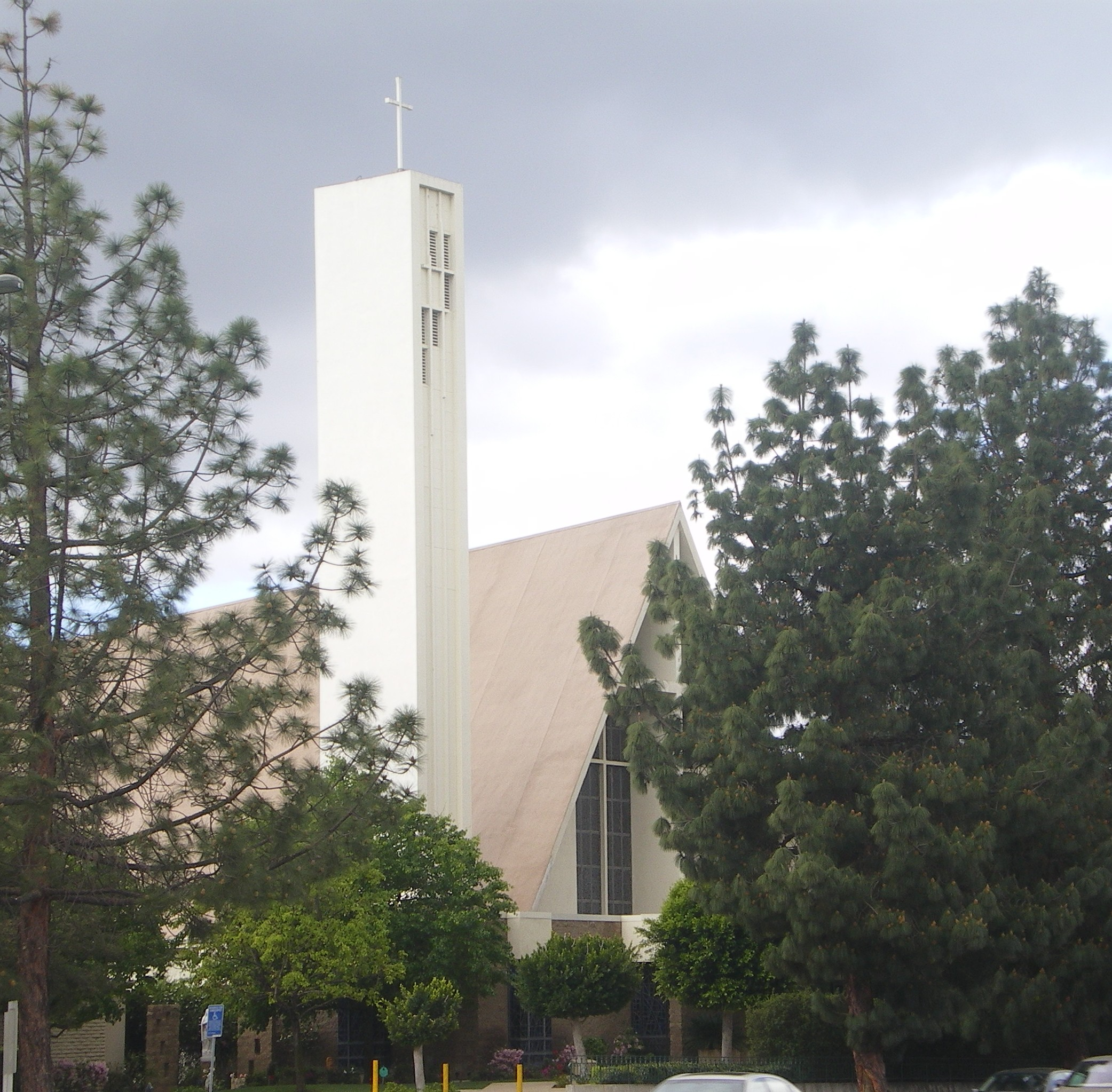
St. Mel's Church, 2008

St. Mel is a Catholic church and elementary school located on Ventura Boulevard in Woodland Hills, Los Angeles, California. St. Mel's parish was established in 1955. As of February 2020, Father Steve Davoren was the pastor, and Mary Beth Lutz was the principal of the school.

== Founding ==
Monsignor Michael J. O'Connor, a native of County Kerry, Ireland, was assigned in 1955 to establish the parish. He is credited with choosing the church's name, selecting design of the sanctuary, development of its school. He remained at St. Mel's until his retirement in 1985. He served as pastor until 1985 and remained at the parish into the late 1990s. During his time at St. Mel's, the parish grew from 415 families to 5,000 families. O'Connor died in 2005 at age 95.

== Church building ==
The main church structure is an A-frame built with poured concrete and 80-foot steel beams. It was considered "radical" and "daring" at the time. It was designed by Los Angeles architect Earl Trudeau. The church was built on a seven-acre parcel that had previously been a walnut grove. Work began in February 1956 for what was referred to as "the most modern and largest Catholic church and school" in the San Fernando Valley. It was the first building costing more than $500,000 planned for Woodland Hills. Construction of the church was completed in the summer of 1958.

Before the church building was constructed, Mass was celebrated in a variety of settings including the Tarzana Women's Club House and the Canoga Park Theater.

== Subsequent history ==
The school opened in 1956 with staffing by the Immaculate Heart Sisters. The Sisters of St. Louis assumed responsibility for staffing the school in 1958.

In 1985, Monsignor John Naughton took over as pastor. He retired in 1990 and was replaced as pastor by Monsignor Padraic Loftus. As of 2010, Monsignor Helmut Hefner was the church's pastor.

In January 1994, the Northridge earthquake caused $1 million in damage to the church. During repairs to the church, services were held in a temporary structure on the grounds of the church; the temporary structure was dubbed "St. Mel in the Field". A $2 million renovation and repair program was completed in 1996. Cardinal Roger Mahoney presided at the rededication.

In 1999, a large mural (33 feet by 24 feet) depicting angels was installed on both sides of the altar. The mural was painted by Yugoslav artist RaDeSha and was titled "St. Mel Crystal Angels".

It was also where the funeral of Toto drummer Jeff Porcaro was partly held in 1992. Porcaro and his family attended the church growing up.

== See also ==
- San Fernando Pastoral Region
