= St. Augustine Academy (Ventura, California) =

- Academia Sancti Augustini
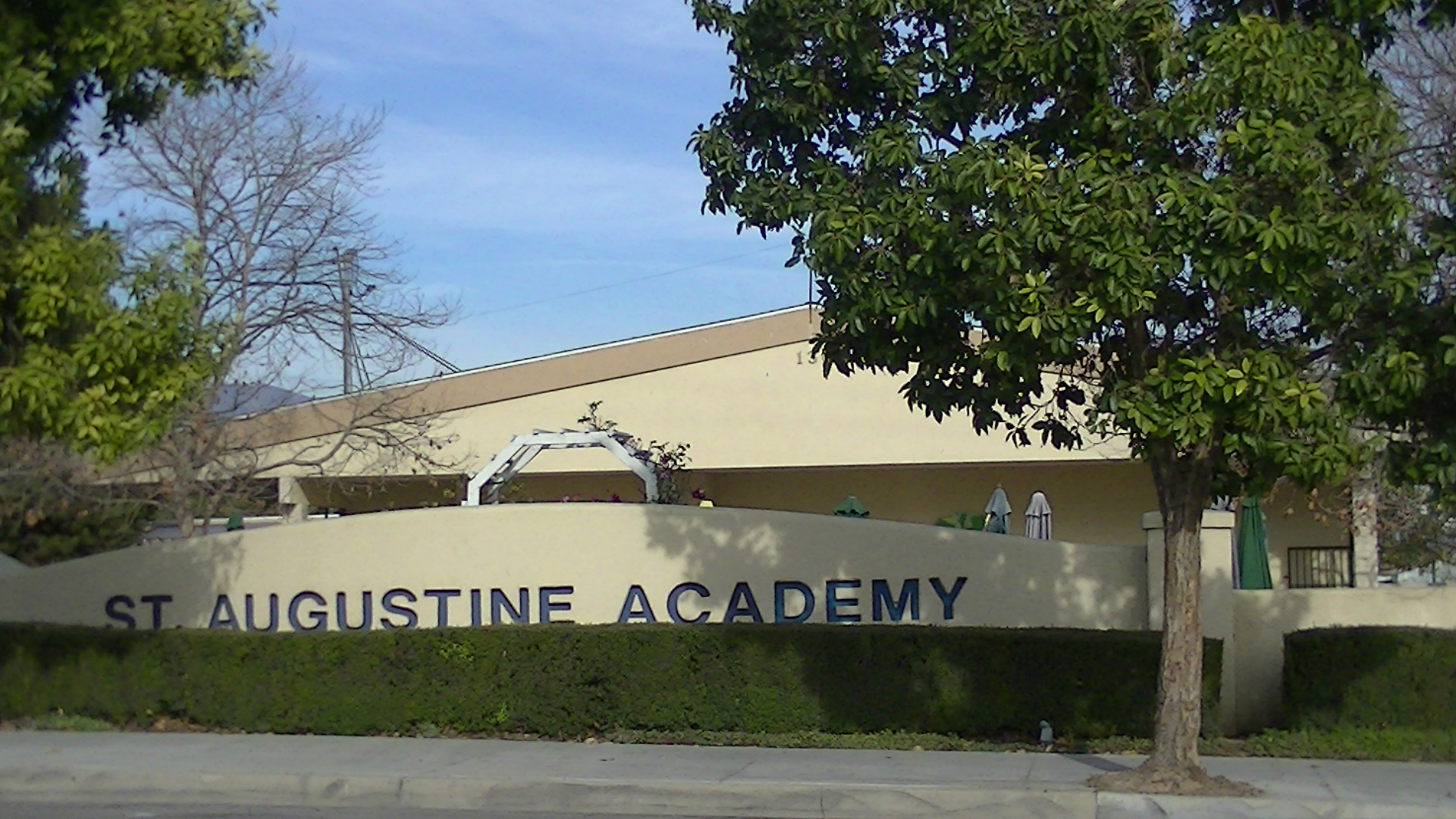

Location
- 130 South Wells Road; Ventura, California 93004; United States; 34°17′38″N 119°9′35″W

Information
- Type: Private, coeducational
- Motto: Da Nobis Recta Sapere. ("Grant unto us true wisdom")
- Religious affiliation: Roman Catholic
- Patron saint: Saint Augustine
- Established: 1994
- Founder: Mr. Roy Rhoter
- Grades: K-12
- Colors: Blue and white
- Team name: Crusaders
- Accreditation: Western Association of Schools and Colleges
- Website: www.saintaugustineacademy.com

St. Augustine Academy is a private, independently operated Roman Catholic school situated in Ventura, California. It is located within the Roman Catholic Archdiocese of Los Angeles The school's patron Saint is Augustine of Hippo. The school offers a classical liberal arts curriculum. The liberal arts are divided into the trivium consisting of grammar, logic and rhetoric, and the quadrivium consisting of arithmetic, geometry, music and astronomy. The school is accredited with the Western Association of Schools and Colleges, WASP, as well as the Western Catholic Educational Association, WCEA.

== Background ==
The school was founded in 1994 by Roy Rohter, after a meeting of Catholic parents who wanted a school where their children could receive a classical liberal arts education that would also focus on assisting their efforts to teach their children about their Catholic faith.

The school is situated on a small plot of land off of Wells Rd.

== School ==
The faculty is 27% male, 72% female, with an average of 8 years at the school. 68% have a graduate degree.

91% of St. Augustine graduates go on to college or university.

St. Augustine's is on the Catholic Education Honor Roll as of October 2017 and was also named to it in 2007, 2008, 2010, 2012, and 2014.

High school students averaged 54 hours of volunteer service to the community in 2014. Total cumulative service hours totaled over 3,426.

St. Augustine's has no athletics program; some students are eligible to play sports at other schools in their district of residence via multi-school agreements.
