= St. Cyril of Jerusalem Church and School =

Catholic Church in California, United States

Coordinates: 34.15442°N 118.47247°W

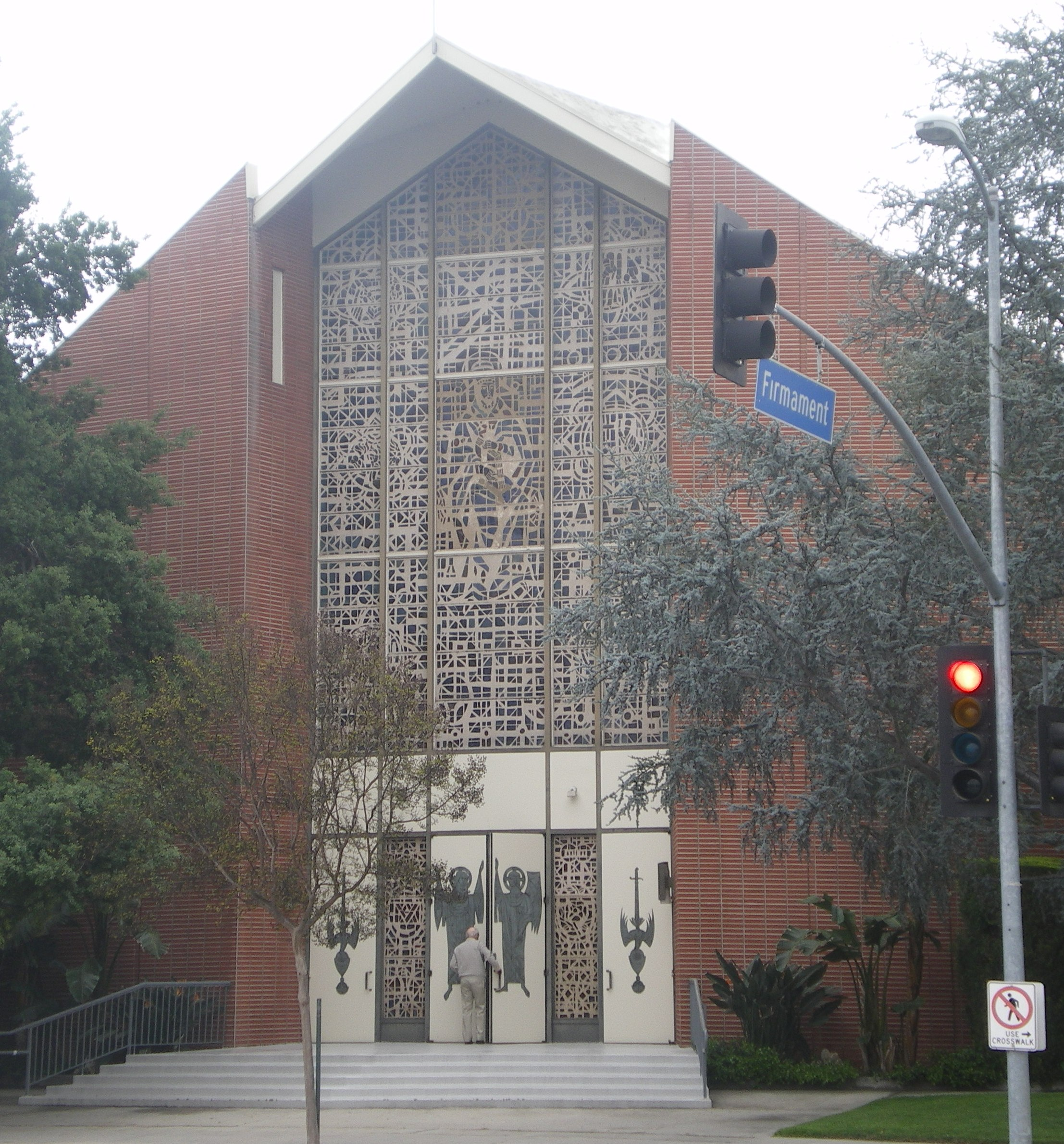
St. Cyril of Jerusalem Church

St. Cyril of Jerusalem Church and School is a Catholic church and elementary school located in Encino, Los Angeles. Founded in 1949, St. Cyril's was voted the "Best Parish" for music in the Los Angeles Archdiocese in 2000.

== Parish history ==
=== Early years ===
In 1949, the Roman Catholic Archdiocese of Los Angeles acquired property on Ventura Boulevard in Encino to build a new parish. Cardinal James Francis McIntyre named the new parish after St. Cyril of Jerusalem, because at the time, Jerusalem was in anguish as a result of the 1948 Arab–Israeli War, and the Cardinal wished to signify the Church's concern for the holy places in Jerusalem.

The Rev. Michael Lalor (a native of Ireland) was the first pastor of St. Cyril's, and the first assistant pastor was the Rev. William Smith, a former army chaplain. When the parish was founded, Mass was initially celebrated at the Nazareth House Home for Boys at Magnolia and Sepulveda. The original church, now the parish hall, was dedicated shortly before Christmas 1950.

=== New church and death of Father Lalor ===
The current church, built in a modern form and having a seating capacity of 900, was opened for Christmas in 1966. Father Lalor died in April 1967 before the new church was dedicated. Cardinal McIntyre presided at a solemn high requiem Mass for Father Lalor at St. Cyril's; Father Lalor was then buried at the San Fernando Mission Cemetery.

=== Subsequent history ===
In 1970, Msgr. Cyril Navin (also a native of Ireland) arrived at St. Cyril's and became the pastor in 1971. Shortly after assuming the pastorship of St. Cyril's, Msgr. Navin faced an immediate crisis. With the expansion of highrises and increased traffic on Ventura Boulevard, the City proposed an extension of Dickens Street that would have closed St. Cyril's School. Msgr. Navin appeared at a public hearing on the proposal and told the group, "Our school would be completely removed if this goes through. It would mean 490 children being thrown out and into the already overburdened public school system." The proposed extension of Dickens Street was defeated.

In April 1974, Timothy Manning, Cardinal Archbishop of Los Angeles, celebrated Mass at St. Cyril's to mark the parish's 50th anniversary. Cardinal McIntyre also attended. In its first 25 years, the Los Angeles Times reported that St. Cyril's had grown from a handful to 2,000 active families. In March 1982, St. Cyril's was the site for the installation ceremony of Rev. Thomas Dolinay as the first bishop of the new Byzantine Ruthenian Diocese of Van Nuys. The Cathedral of St. Mary Byzantine Catholic Church, located a short distance from St. Cyril's, is the home of the Van Nuys Eparchy.

Msgr. Navin remained the pastor at St. Cyril's until 1996 when he became Pastor Emeritus. Msgr. Carl Bell, formerly pastor of Immaculate Heart of Mary Catholic Church in Hollywood, became the fourth pastor at St. Cyril's in 1996.

In April and May 2003, a string of arson fires struck houses of worship in Encino, including a Presbyterian church, an Iranian synagogue, a Bahá'í community center, and Valley Beth Shalom on Ventura Boulevard. As a demonstration of solidarity during the rash of fires, St. Cyril's hosted an interfaith service on May 8, 2003. St. Cyril's business manager, Ginny Panza, told the Los Angeles Times: "We're not freaking out, but everybody is a little bit more aware, watchful."

== The school ==
The parish opened a grammar school in 1950. Currently, the school offers classes from Pre-Kindergarten through eighth grade. The school has received full accreditation from the Western Association of Schools and Colleges (WASC). Extra curricular activities include student council, California Junior Scholastic Federation, Angel on My Shoulder (community service), academic decathlon, mock trial, yearbook, and altar services. Sports include boys flag football (2014 League Champions), boys volleyball (2010 League Champions), girls volleyball, boys basketball ( 2010 Runners up), girls basketball (2007 Final Four), girls softball (2006 league champions), and boys and girls swimming.

In 2007, St. Cyril's received the "2007 Outstanding Board Award" from the National Catholic Education Association, for the active involvement of the school's board.

As of the 2014–2015 school year, St. Cyril's reported having 254 students with classroom sizes for the kindergarten through eighth grades between 25 and 35 students. In 2005, the school reported the following racial makeup among its students: White (Non-Hispanic) – 69%; Hispanic 15.66%; Asian/Pacific Islander – 10.66%; and Black (Non-Hispanic) – 4.66%).

== Voted "Best Parish" Music in Los Angeles Archdiocese ==
In a survey conducted by Los Angeles Mission magazine from September through December 2000, St. Cyril of Jerusalem was voted the "Best Parish" for music in the Los Angeles Archdiocese. The article announcing the results noted: "St. Cyril's choir features a 40-plus-voice choir directed by well-known organist and choral conductor, William 'Bill' Beck. Our Sunday noon Mass is as solemn as the Novus Ordo can be. We sing only the very best music, which includes music from the Renaissance, baroque, classical and modern eras. The male schola sings the Gregorian introit and communion each Sunday. We have several major choral events with full orchestra and enhanced choral forces throughout the year."

In 1988, noted choral director, Roger Wagner, conducted the combined forces of the Roger Wagner Chorale, St. Cyril's Choir and St. Philip's Choir along with a full orchestra in a performance of Requiem by Maurice Duruflé at St. Cyril's. In 1990, St. Cyril's drew praise when it performed Beethoven's Mass in C with a 40-piece orchestra, a 50-member choir and four soloists, all conducted by William Beck. Performances of St. Cyril's Choir and Orchestra, under the direction of William Beck (including Handel's Messiah and Mendelssohn's Elijah), were regularly noted by the Los Angeles Times. Mark Chatfield, who sang for 19 years at St. Cyril's, and was the parish's composer in residence, was also a swimmer who set an Olympic record in the breaststroke in the 1972 Olympics.

== Celebrity connections to St. Cyril's ==
Being located in a community with many celebrity residents, St. Cyril's has been the home parish of celebrities and has been the site of many Hollywood weddings, funerals and other events, including the following:

- In June 1961, St. Cyril's made page 2 of the Los Angeles Times, as Father Lalor baptized John Clark Gable, the son of actor Clark Gable who died several months before the birth. The ceremony at St. Cyril's was attended by Mrs. Gable, Fred Astaire, Jack Benny, Robert Stack, Cesar Romero, Louella Parsons, Hedda Hopper, Mervyn LeRoy, and Leo Carrillo. The Los Angeles Times reported: "Even Marilyn Monroe was there, slipping quietly through the throng in a subdued black dress."
- In June 1965, the wedding of Annette Funicello to her agent Jack Gilardi took place at St. Cyril's, with Fr. Lalor presiding. The Los Angeles Times reported that the church was filled with 1,000 invited guests, including usher Frankie Avalon and bridesmaid Shelley Fabares, "while several hundred fans waited, and some skateboarded, outside St. Cyril's Catholic Church in Encino." Funicello, who met Gilardi when she was 14 and he was 26, wore a headpiece copied from the one she wore in the film "Babes in Toyland.
- In March 1976, the funeral for actor Richard Arlen, who appeared in more than 140 films and was best known for his role as a pilot in the 1927 Academy Award-winning Wings, was held at St. Cyril's. The funeral was attended by Forrest Tucker, John Agar, Gene Raymond, Phil Regan, Eleanor Parker, Dennis James, Horace Heidt, Buddy Rogers, and Jack Oakie.
- In December 1981, the funeral for Allan Dwan, legendary director of more than 400 silent and talking films (including Robin Hood, Heidi, Rebecca of Sunnybrook Farm and Sands of Iwo Jima) and inventor of the dolly shot and the overhead tracking shot, was held at St. Cyril's.
- Leave It to Beaver star, Tony Dow, sent his children to St. Cyril's in the 1980s.
- In February 1991, the funeral of television comedian George Gobel, star of his own weekly NBC television show, The George Gobel Show, from 1954 to 1960, was held at St. Cyril's. Gobel also appeared in several films and as a frequent guest on Johnny Carson's The Tonight Show and Hollywood Squares.
- In October 2004, the funeral services for Leroy Gordon "Gordo" Cooper Jr., one of the seven original astronauts in Project Mercury, the first crewed space flight by the United States, were held at St. Cyril's. In May 1963, Cooper flew on the last Mercury mission, orbiting the Earth 22 times and logging more time in space than all five previous Mercury astronauts combined.
- In August 2004, St. Cyril's was the site of the funeral for Eugene Roche, an actor who appeared in Slaughterhouse Five, and multiple episodes of the television series, Soap, All in the Family, Dave's World, Murder, She Wrote, Magnum, P.I., Night Court, Airwolf, Quincy, M.E., and Naked City, and was also known as the "Ajax man" in 1970s television commercials.

== Pastors ==
St. Cyril's has had only six pastors in its history. They are:

- Rev. Michael Lalor (1949–1967)
- Msgr. Christopher Bradley (1967–1971)
- Msgr. Cyril Navin (1971–1996)
- Msgr. Carl Bell (1996–2011)
- Rev. Larry Neumeier (2011-2015)
- Rev. Eben MacDonald (2015–2023)
- Rev. Danilo Guinto, Administrator (2023–present)

== Notable alumni ==
- Melanie Griffith - actress
- Cherie Currie - actress / lead singer of The Runaways
- Bruce Watson - guitarist of Foreigner
- Christopher Bowman - olympic figure skater
- Bobby Schayer - drummer of Bad Religion
- Jill Schoelen - actress
- Kevin Brophy - actor
- Thomas Del Ruth - Director of Photography - Two Time Emmy Winner / Class of 1956

== See also ==
- San Fernando Pastoral Region
