= Our Lady of Grace (Encino) =

Catholic church and elementary school in Los Angeles

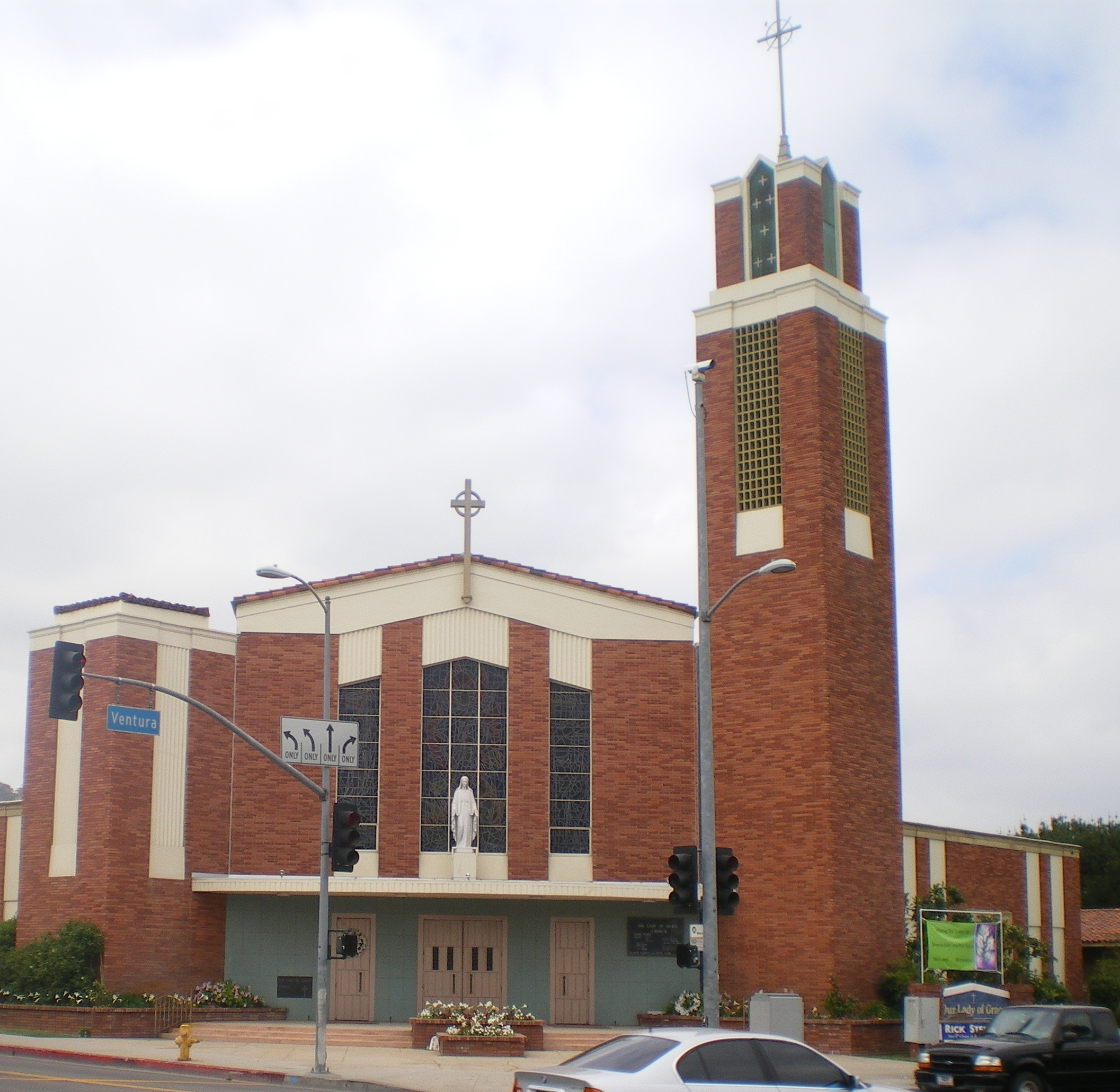
Our Lady of Grace Church, Encino

Our Lady of Grace Catholic Church & School is a Catholic church and elementary school located in Encino, Los Angeles, California, at the corner of Ventura Boulevard and White Oak. The parish operates the Our Lady of Grace Elementary School. Crespi Carmelite High School is also adjacent to the parish.

== History ==
Our Lady of Grace Parish and Our Lady of Grace Elementary School were developed in the years following World War II as the population of the San Fernando Valley boomed. The parish celebrated its first Mass on December 16, 1945, in the packing room of Canoga Farms, owned by Frank Flowers, a Presbyterian.

In the 1990s the Church served 2,400 families. It began holding mass in Spanish in 1991, as the neighborhood's population of Mexican immigrants burgeoned.

The Church grounds feature a garden and fountain sculpture erected in memory of Nicole Parker, a child who was the victim of a notorious 1993 child kidnapping and murder.

In 1965 a solid gold chalice usually stored in the church's safe, was reported stolen.

In January 2018, a priest, Father Juan Cano, was removed from the church "on suspicion of having inappropriate conduct with multiple female parishioners - one of whom is an underage girl."

== Schools ==
The parish's elementary school opened in September 1947. As of 1998, the elementary school had 336 pupils. Notable former students include author Barry Lopez.

In February 1959, the Los Angeles Archdiocese announced plans to build a high school for 600 boys, staffed by Carmelite fathers, adjacent to Our Lady of Grace. The high school opened in the fall of 1959 as Crespi Carmelite High School. Crespi has produced numerous notable athletes, including All-Pro football player Randy Cross, Major League Baseball player and World Series MVP Rick Dempsey, NBA player Paul Mokeski, and Major League Baseball pitcher and NLCS MVP Jeff Suppan. Singers Gunnar and Matthew Nelson attended the school in the 1980s. Actors Martin Donovan and Michael Angarano are also Crespi alumni.

== Pastors ==
The parish has been served by several pastors over its history:

- Father Ignatius McDonnell was the pastor in the mid to late 1950s.
- Monsignor Francis M. Osborne was the pastor for 26 years from 1959 to 1985. Osborne oversaw the construction of the current, 1,300-seat church from 1960 to 1961.
- Gerald Wilkerson was the pastor from 1985 to 1998. In 1998, Wilkerson was ordained as a bishop by Cardinal Roger Mahony, Archbishop of Los Angeles. His ordination took place at Our Lady of Grace. Bishop Wilkerson, who grew up in Long Beach, California and was ordained in 1965, came to Our Lady of Grace as pastor in 1982.
- Father Austin Doran became pastor in May 1998.
- Msgr. Jarlath (Jay) Cunnane, a native of Ireland, is the current pastor, and has served in that role since at least 2013. Cunnane was profiled by the Los Angeles Times in 2001 and by The New York Times in 2006 for his work with immigrant families at St. Thomas the Apostle Church in Pico-Union.

== See also ==
- San Fernando Pastoral Region
