= Holy Family Catholic Church (Glendale, California) =

Church and school in Glendale, California, US

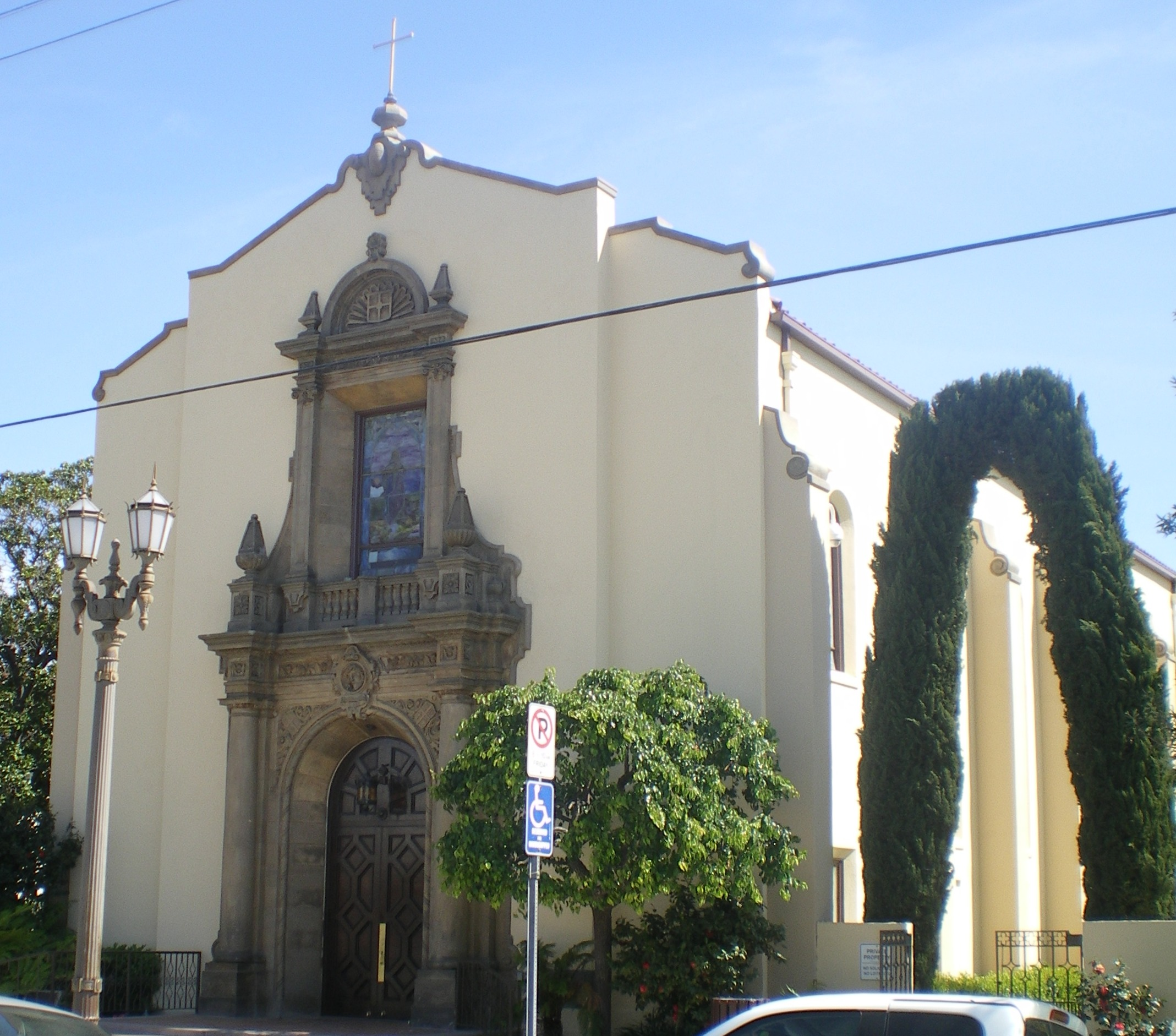
- Holy Family Catholic Church, Glendale

Religion
- Affiliation: Catholic

Location
- Interactive map of Holy Family Catholic Church
- Coordinates: 34.1413°N 118.25283°W

Architecture
- Established: 1907

Website
- www.hfglendale.org

Holy Family Catholic Church is a Catholic parish located on Elk Avenue in Glendale, California that consists of a Catholic church and a grade school. It formerly hosted an all-girls high school. Founded in 1907, it is the oldest parish in Glendale.

== Parish history ==
=== Early years (1907–1923) ===
The City of Glendale was incorporated in 1906, and in 1907 Bishop Thomas Conaty sent Father James Stephen O'Neill to Glendale to establish a new parish. Initially, the parish celebrated Mass on the second floor of the Tropico Mercantile Building on San Fernando Road. Later, Mass was celebrated in a two-story house near the corner of Brand and Windsor. The parish's 65 members had previously travelled to Mass either at the Plaza Church in Los Angeles or the San Gabriel Mission. Father O'Neill also held services in Burbank and built churches in both places. In Burbank he met Mother Frances Cabrini (later to be canonized St. Frances Cabrini) and spiritually administered to her and her community of Missionary Sisters of the Sacred Heart of Jesus. In 1908, the church acquired land near East Lomita Avenue and Adams Street where a simple frame church was erected.

In 1921, the current church building on Elk Avenue was completed, though it was not dedicated until 1922. Above the main entrance, there is a sandstone carving of the head of Christ crowned with thorns created by the noted Italian sculptor, Joseph Conradi. The carving bears the inscription "consumatum est" or "It is finished." Bishop John Joseph Cantwell presided at the dedication, and a banquet was held at the Glendale Chamber of Commerce.

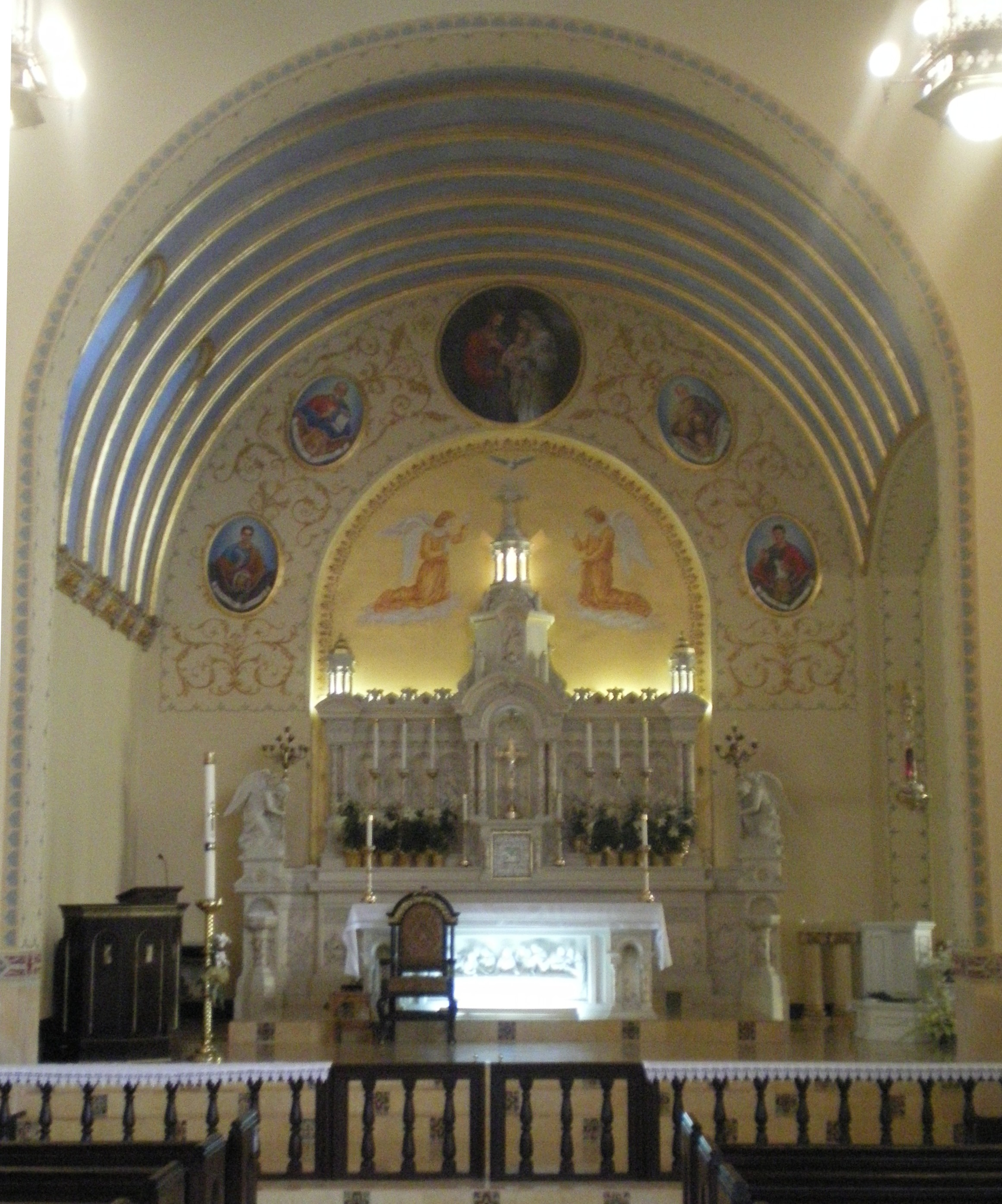
Altar at Holy Family

=== Father Galvin (1923–1974) ===
In 1923, Father O'Neill was transferred to Oxnard, California, and succeeded by Father Michael J. Galvin, a native of Ireland. Galvin remained pastor at Holy Family for nearly 50 years until 1972. Under his guidance, the girls' high school and two elementary schools were built, the convent enlarged and seating capacity of the church doubled. Named a Papal Chamberlain in 1933, a Domestic Prelate in 1937 and a Protonotary Apostolic in 1959, Father Galvin died in 1974.

As Glendale's population grew from 2,742 in 1910 to 67,736 in 1930, parishioners were forced to line up on the sidewalk for Sunday Mass due to the limited seating capacity. In 1949, a new wing to the left of the altar was completed to increase the seating capacity.

Extensive damage was done to the front exterior of the church during the Sylmar earthquake on February 9, 1971. Masses were offered in the relatively untouched wing of the church until the damaged main section of the church was repaired.

=== Recent history ===
In 1971, Monsignor Charles G. Cranham, a Minneapolis native, was appointed by Archbishop Timothy Manning to serve as co-administrator of Holy Family Parish with Monsignor Galvin. In 1972, Msgr. Galvin retired, and Msgr. Cranham took over as pastor. However, Msgr. Cranham died after only two years as pastor.

Father Arthur J. Lirette, a native of Eureka, California, served as the parish's fourth pastor for 21 years from 1974 to 1995. In 1975 he was named monsignor and later a Protonotary Apostolic. He retired in 1995 and remained at the parish as pastor emeritus until his death in 2007.

In 1991, vandals broke into the church, breaking stained-glass windows to gain entry, and smashing the heads of three treasured religious statues. Because the only apparent motive was the desecration of religious objects, Glendale police investigated the break-in as a hate crime.

Father Joseph Shea, a native of Van Nuys, was named administrator of Holy Family in 1995 and pastor in 1996. During the year of 2007, the 100th birthday of Holy Family, Fr. Shea worked hard in rebuilding the church to the way it was 80 years ago. In 2008, Fr. Shea was succeeded by Father Jim Bevacqua. Holy Family parish has 4,500 registered families.

== The schools ==
Holy Family Grade School opened in 1925 under the direction of the Sisters of Charity of the Blessed Virgin Mary. By 1963, the grade school had more than 600 students. B.V.M. Sisters served as the principals from 1925 until 1990 when the first lay principal, Marian Heintz, was appointed. Mrs. Heintz retired after 30 years of teaching at the grade school. She was succeeded by Dr. Fidela Suelto. In 1937, Holy Family High School opened, under the direction of the Sisters of Charity.

== See also ==
- Holy Family High School (Glendale, California)
- San Fernando Pastoral Region
