= Holy Family High School (Glendale, California) =

Location
- 400 East Lomita Avenue; Glendale, (Los Angeles County), California 91205; United States; 34°8′27″N 118°15′3″W

Information
- Type: Private, All-Female
- Religious affiliation: Roman Catholic
- Established: 1937
- Status: Closed
- Closed: 2023
- Head of school: Robert Bringas, Jr.
- Grades: 9-12
- Colors: Purple and Gold
- Mascot: "Gaels"
- Team name: Gaels
- Accreditation: Western Association of Schools and Colleges
- Yearbook: Response
- Assistant Principal - Dir. of Enrollment Management: Therese Peters
- Assistant Principal - Dir. of Finance: Glory Williams
- Athletics Director: Nathaniel Ziomek
- Director of Campus Ministry: Andrew Villa
- Dir. of Professional Growth & Student Data Mgmnt.: Kim Jones

Holy Family High School was a Catholic, all-girls preparatory school in Glendale, California. It was located in the Roman Catholic Archdiocese of Los Angeles.

== Background ==
Holy Family Girls High School, a college-preparatory school, opened its doors to 21 freshmen in September 1937. For three years, classes were held on the top floor of the grade school and were conducted by the Sisters of Charity of the Blessed Virgin Mary, with Sister Mary St. Bertha, B.V.M., as principal until 1943. Members of the charter class recall that the chemistry lab was a former piano lesson room, that the first issue of the school paper was published under the most adverse conditions, and that only high school girls could use the front stairs.

In 1940, because of the growing enrollment, Msgr. Galvin purchased the old Knights of Columbus Hall on Lomita Avenue and converted it into a four-year high school. There were seventeen members in the charter graduating class of 1941, and, as enrollment continued to grow, so did the very special spirit that has characterized Holy Family High from its earliest years.

In 1951 Msgr. Galvin purchased two more lots adjacent to the high school on the east for the construction of the present building. Under the principalship of S. Mary George Francis, B.V.M., the Class of 1952 was the first class to graduate from the new building. Msgr. Galvin continued as chief administrator until 1972. In 1974, during the administration of Sister Ann Eileen Clancy, B.V.M., Msgr. Arthur J. Lirette became pastor. He showed a constant personal interest in all the activities of the school, academic, religious, and social. During the ensuing fifteen years, the chief building project was the retrofitting of the parish church and the parish elementary school, both of which had suffered damage in the earthquakes of 1971 and 1987, whereas the high school building had stood firm.

Msgr. Lirette retired in 1996 during the principalship of Ms Jacqueline Kresal, who had assumed duties as the first lay principal in 1987. Holy Family High School was served by seven B.V.M. principals since its founding in 1937, and a board of directors.

In 2023, Holy Family High School announced its closure.

== See also ==
- Holy Family Catholic Church (Glendale, California)
