= St. Robert Bellarmine Catholic Church (Burbank, California) =

Californian Catholic church

Coordinates: 34.18474°N 118.30613°W

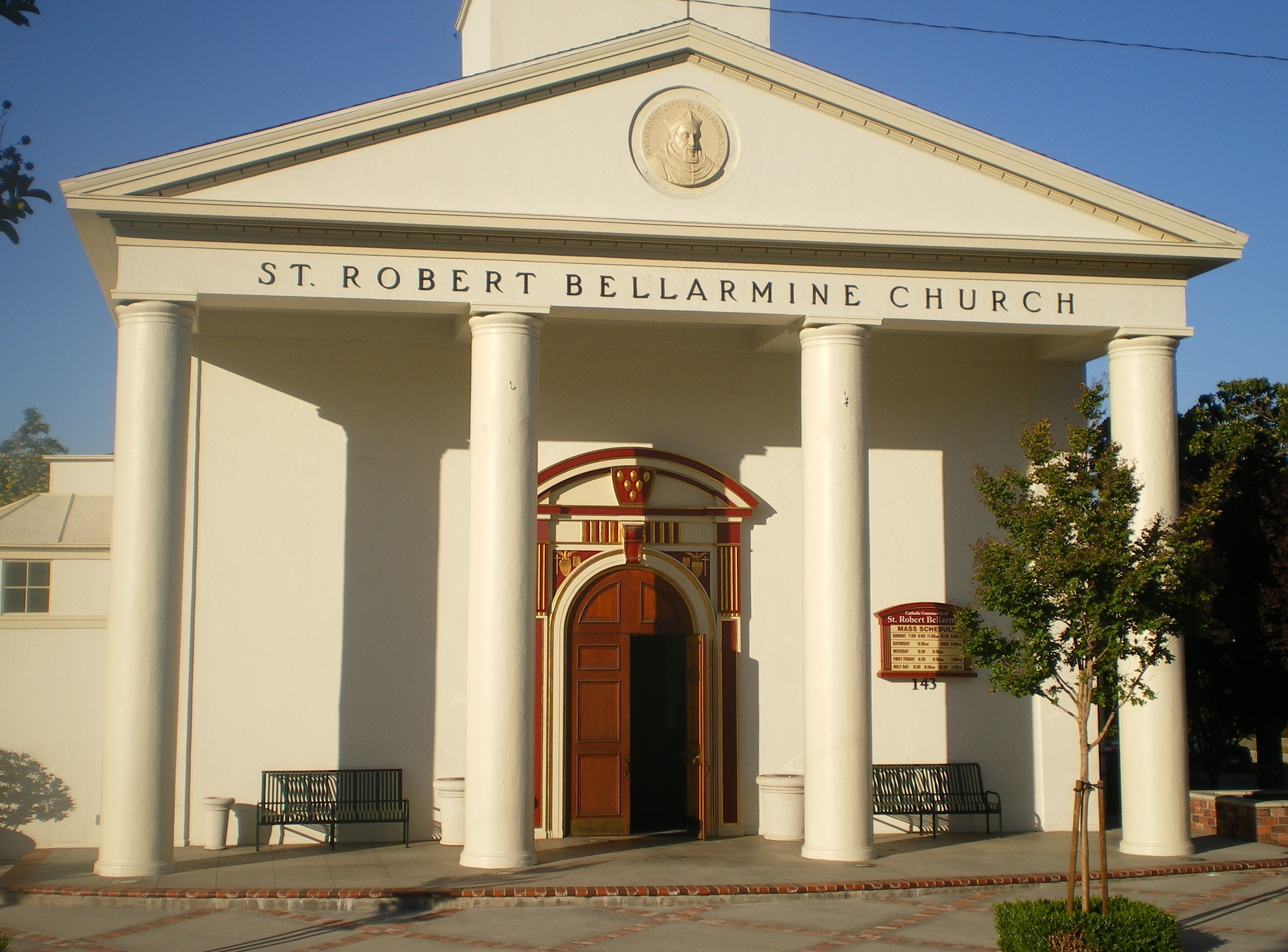
St. Robert Bellarmine in Burbank, California

St. Robert Bellarmine Catholic Church is a Catholic parish on North Fifth Street in Burbank, California. It includes a Catholic church, elementary school, and high school. Founded in 1907, it was one of the first Catholic churches in the San Fernando Valley. Known as Holy Trinity Parish until 1939, it was renamed in honor of Robert Bellarmine. The church and school buildings on the St. Robert Bellarmine campus are modeled after colonial American buildings, including Monticello, Independence Hall, Mount Vernon. and the library at the University of Virginia.

== History ==
=== Early years ===
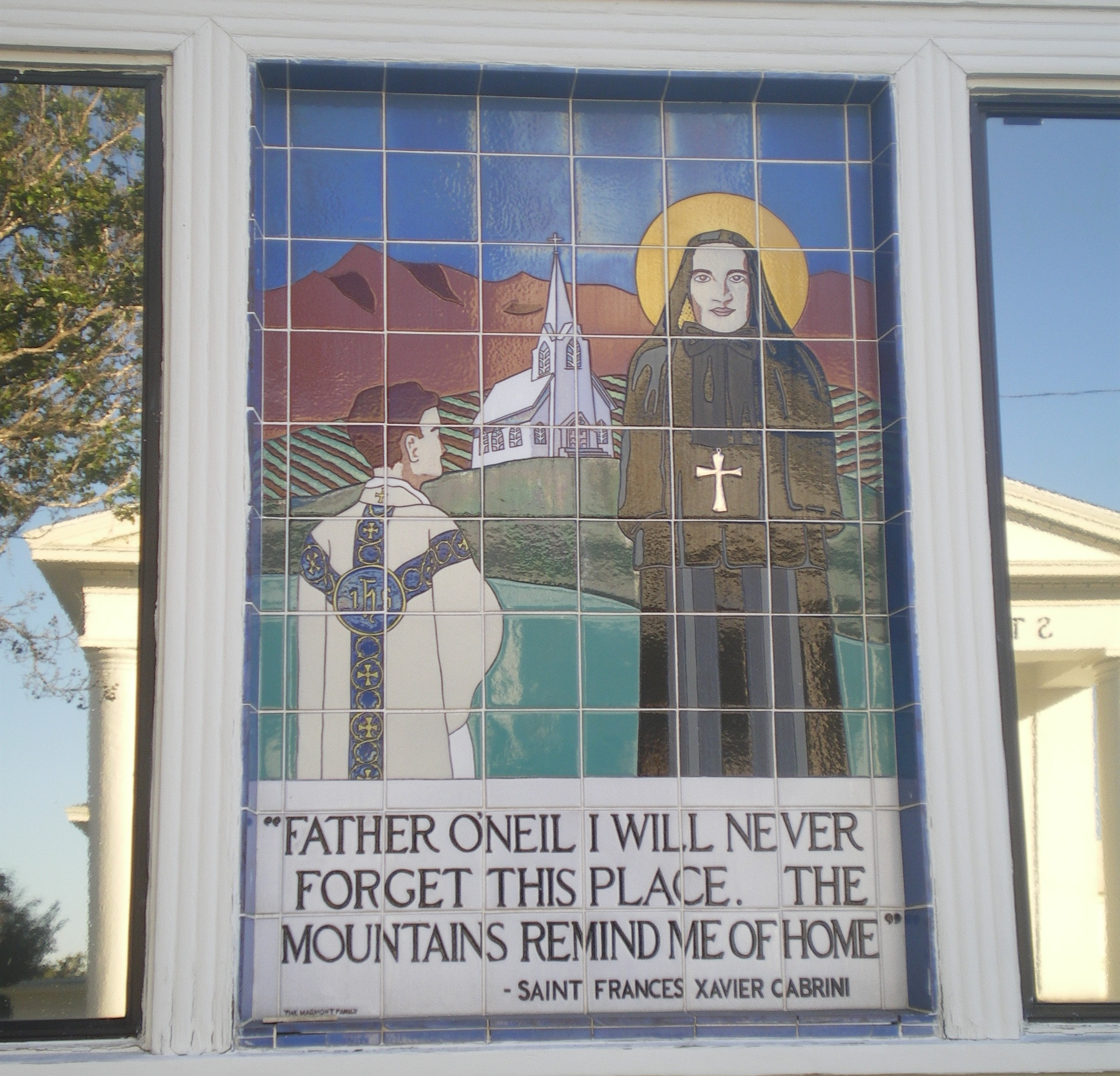
Mother Cabrini attended mass at the parish in its early years.

The parish was founded in 1907 as Holy Trinity Parish. The first mass was presided over by James O'Neil, then pastor of Holy Family in Glendale, at the Odd Fellows Hall at the corner of San Fernando Road and Olive Avenue. The original church (now the elementary school) was built in 1909 and was the first Catholic church in the San Fernando Valley. By the late 1920s, the parish included all of Burbank, Sun Valley and other areas in the San Fernando Valley.

=== Mother Cabrini ===
Around the time the parish was founded, Mother Frances Xavier Cabrini obtained 475 acres (1.92 km^{2}) in the Verdugo Mountains above Burbank at the present site of Woodbury University. Cabrini built a school, chapel and "preventorium" where girls could learn without fear of catching tuberculosis. She prayed daily in a one-room shrine to the Virgin Mary, built atop a hill overlooking the valley. Cabrini attended mass at Holy Trinity while in Burbank, and later said of the parish: "I shall never forget this place. The mountains remind me of home."

=== Martin Cody Keating: pastor from 1930-1967 ===
Martin Keating saluting at Bellarmine-Jefferson H.S.

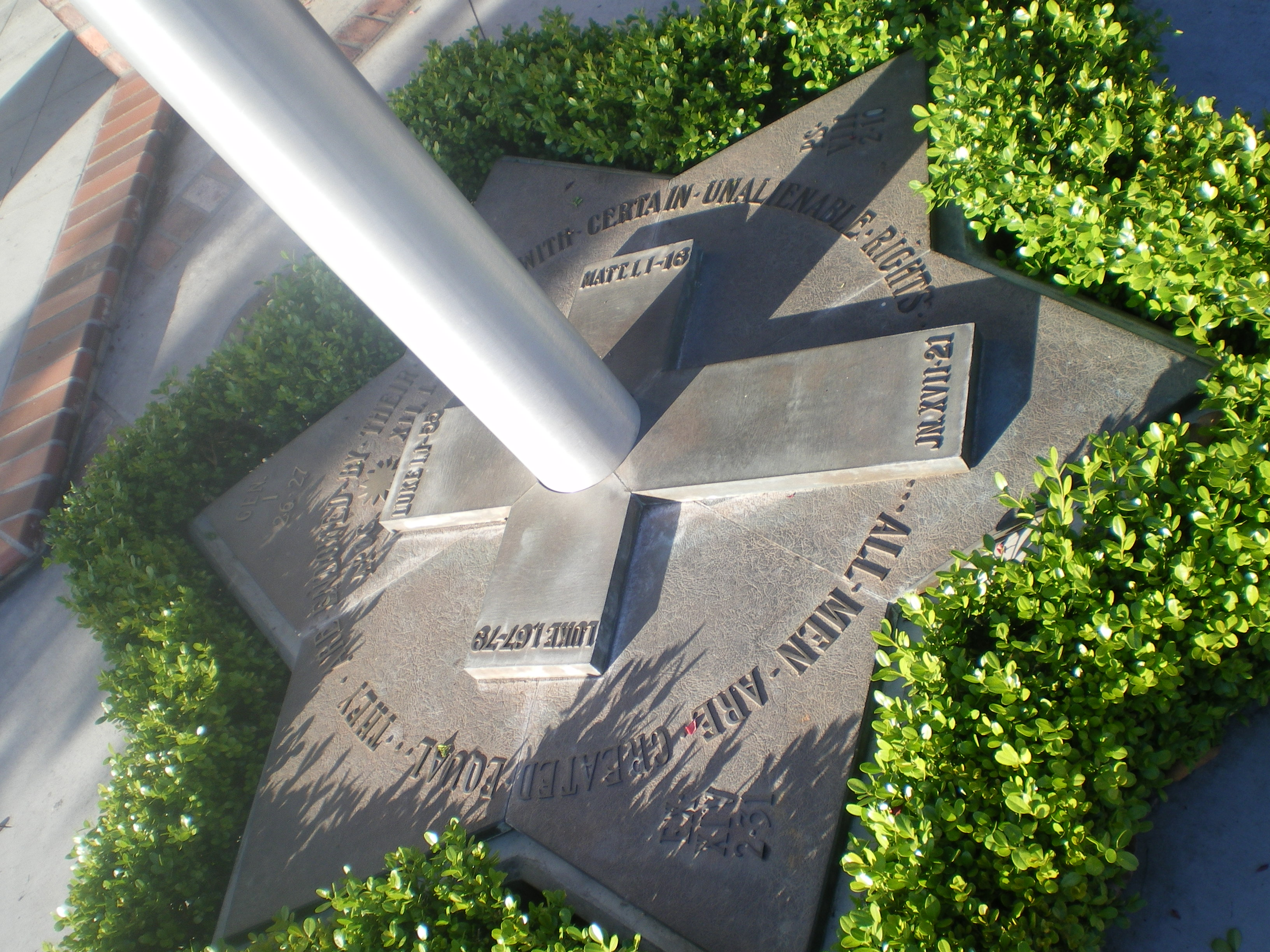
Base of flagple at the church; Keating patented a "desk ornament" in the same design.

In 1930, Martin Cody Keating became pastor, a position he held for 37 years until his retirement in 1967. Keating was a chaplain in World War I and a patriot with a deep respect for the country's founding fathers, especially Thomas Jefferson. After his service in World War I, Keating was assigned to a new parish in Fresno, for which he chose the name "Our Lady of Victory" (subsequently renamed St. Therese) in thanksgiving for victory in that war. In August 1945, Keating received a patent for a desk ornament of an American flag mounted on a cross mounted on a star of David. At the St. Robert Bellarmine parish centennial in 2007, Cardinal Roger Mahony recalled that his older brother attended Bellarmine-Jefferson High School; as a boy, Mahony would visit the campus to take his brother to school. He recalled seeing Keating dressed in an Army uniform for the flag raising ceremony and opening prayer. "He had great devotion to his country as well as to God," Cardinal Mahony said. Keating was also known as a champion of labor and war veterans. In 1939, Keating renamed the parish from Holy Trinity to St. Robert Bellarmine. Keating believed that Bellarmine's writings had been an influence on Thomas Jefferson, and that the Declaration of Independence was based on Bellarmine's dictum written in 1567: "All men are equal, not in wisdom or in grace, but in the essence and nature of mankind." That theory was advanced by Catholic intellectuals in the 1920s, but is rejected by modern scholars. Keating further honored the founders by using colonial architecture for all the campus buildings: church, rectory, and high school (named Bellarmine-Jefferson in joint tribute to Robert Bellarmine and Thomas Jefferson).

In 1936, Keating also formed the Bellarmine-Jefferson Guards. That same year, the unit served as the honor guard for Cardinal Eugenio Pacelli (the future Pope Pius XII) on his arrival and departure from Burbank. Keating established the Guard unit with this pledge: "I enlist to become a better American: first by thanking almighty God for guiding Thomas Jefferson, George Washington, and the founding fathers of this republic in giving me the protection of the Declaration of Independence and the Constitution of the United States." Pope Pius XII later recognized Keating's lifelong championship of patriotism and his advocacy of the cause of labor by appointing him a papal chamberlain in 1937 and a domestic prelate in 1950.

=== Modern history ===
From 1969 to 1986, Paul Seday, headed the parish. Seday had served as an associate pastor at St. Robert starting in 1965 and retired in 1986 at age 67.

From 1986 to 2002, Patrick Reilly, a native of Ireland, was the pastor at St. Robert. Reilly retired in 2002 and became pastor emeritus, a title which he continued to hold in 2008. In February 2004, Reilly was accused in a civil lawsuit of molesting a boy more than two decades earlier at a parish school in the San Gabriel Valley. Reilly had not been accused of any prior misconduct, according to the archdiocese, and the Clergy Misconduct Board of the archdiocese reviewed the allegation and concluded there was "no credible evidence of misconduct" on Reilly's part.

Lawrence Signey was the pastor at St. Robert Bellarmine from 2002 to 2007. He died in March 2007 at age 45. Cardinal Roger Mahony presided at the funeral mass for Signey. John Collins, raised in Galway, Ireland, was appointed parish administrator in 2007 following Signey's death.

In 2007, the parish celebrated its 100th anniversary. The centennial concluded In September 2007, with a mass concelebrated by Cardinal Roger Mahony, Auxiliary Bishop Gerald Eugene Wilkerson, John Collins, Patrick Reilly, and about 10 other priests. The mass was followed by a gala celebration in the parish hall attended by more than 500 people.

== Buildings and architecture ==
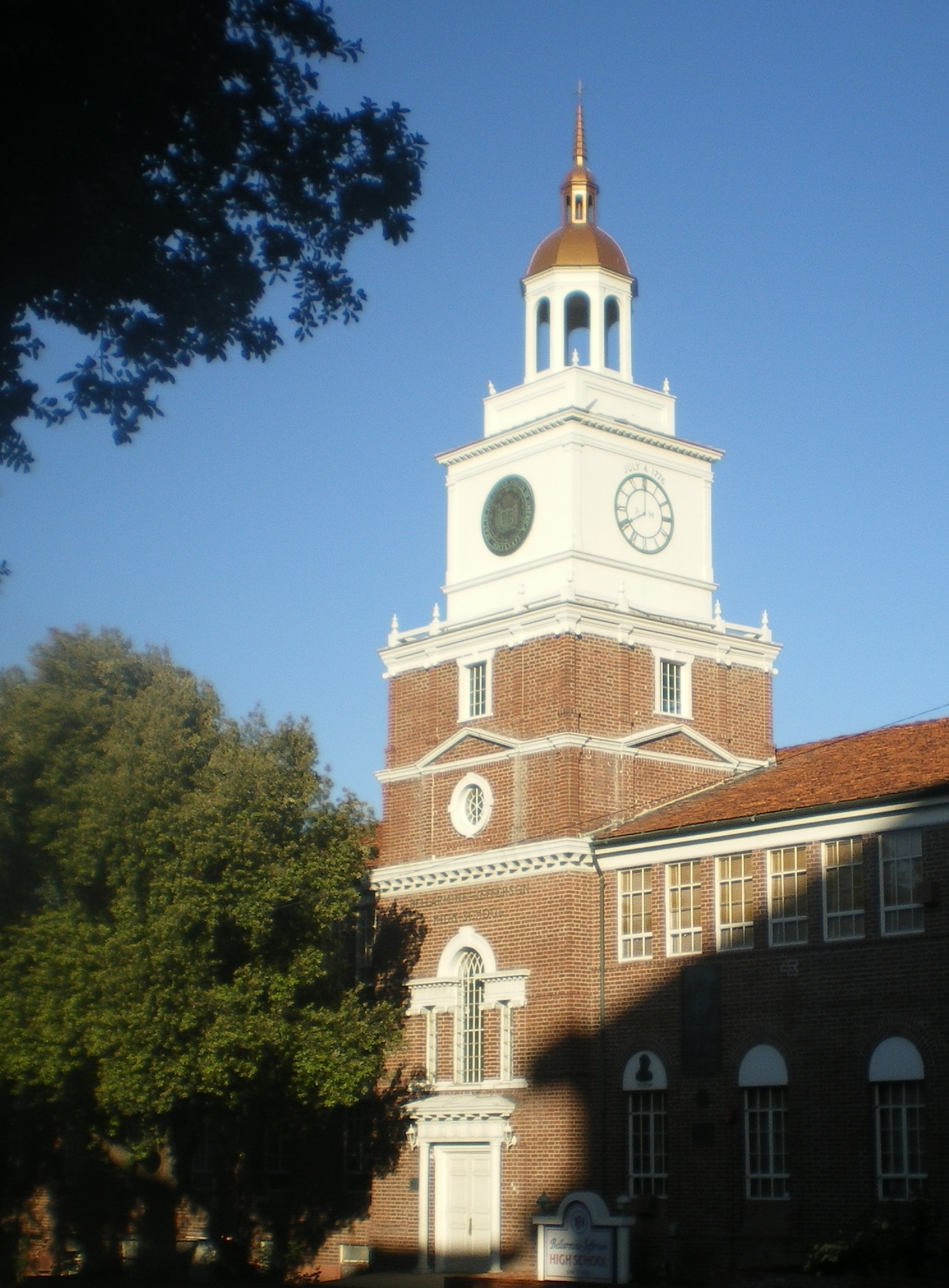
Bellarmine-Jefferson High School modeled after Independence Hall

Under the direction of Keating, the campus of St. Robert Bellarmine incorporates colonial architecture reminiscent of important structures in American history. Its buildings are featured in An Architectural Guidebook to Los Angeles which describes the campus as follows: "Monsignor Martin Cody Keating, the priest who envisioned this, deserves some kind of medal. Next to God, his hero was Thomas Jefferson. ... Three cheers for the architect(s) and the priest who conceived of (and for the church who endorsed) this Fourth of July celebration."

The elementary school, a 1930s rebuilding of the original Holy Trinity Church, is partly Neoclassical (based on Thomas Jefferson's stables at Monticello), and partly Moderne.

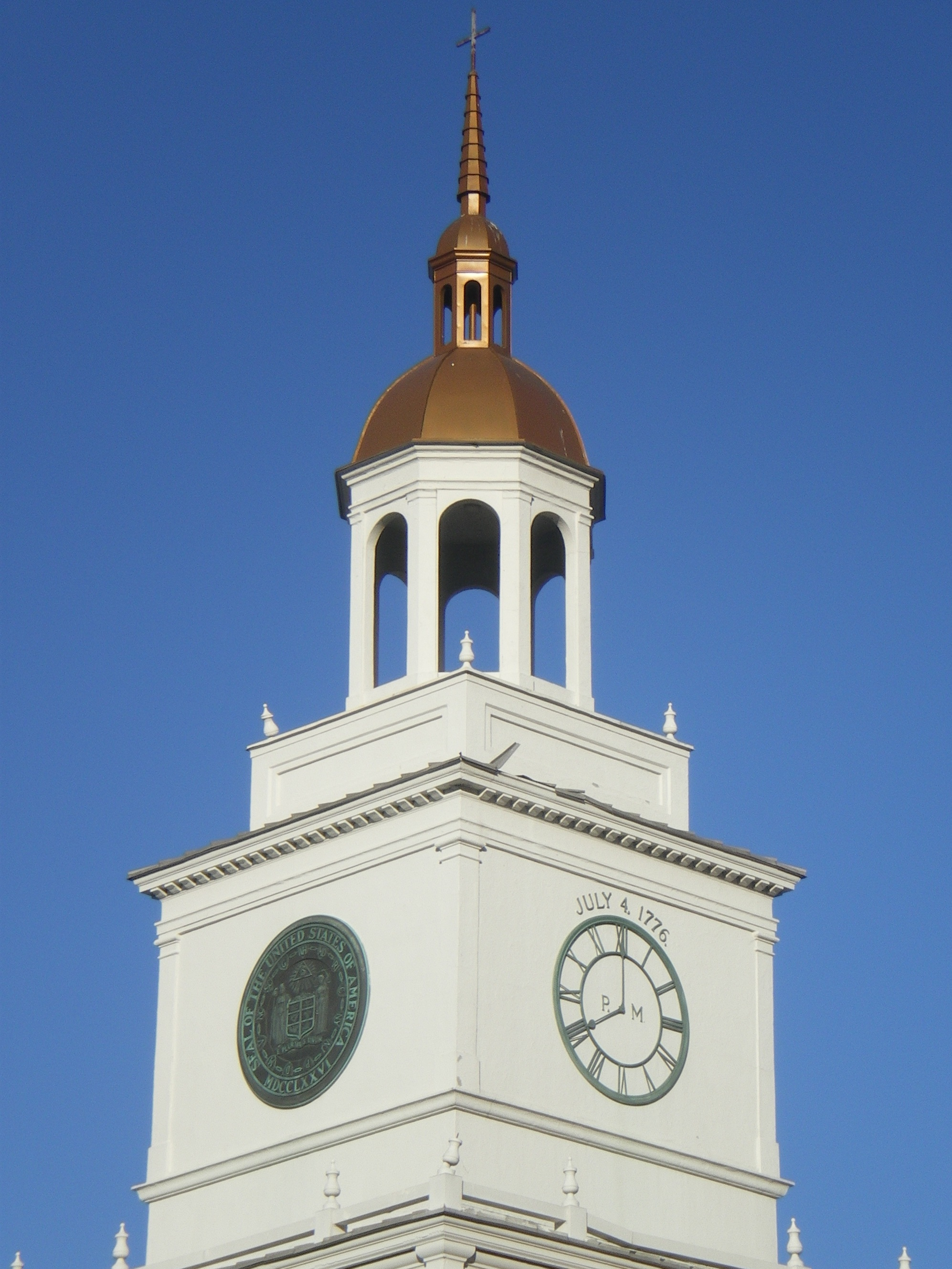
The tower clock is permanently set at the time the Declaration of Independence was signed.

The portico of the current church, dedicated in 1939 and designed by George Adams, was modeled on the south front of Jefferson's home at Monticello. The flagpole in front of the church has a bronze plaque at its base with both the Star of David and the Cross. It is inscribed with an excerpt from the Declaration of Independence: "All men are created equal. They are endowed by their Creator with unalienable rights." In an alcove on the left side of the church, there was previously a statue of St. Robert Bellarmine holding a book inscribed with the words: "Political right is from God and necessarily inherent in the nature of man."

The rectory, built in 1967, was modeled after George Washington's home at Mount Vernon. The parish's three resident priests live at the rectory.

Bellarmine-Jefferson High School was named by Keating after both Robert Bellarmine and Thomas Jefferson in a tribute to commonly held ideals of both. The main high school building was built in 1945 and designed by Barker and Ott. The facade of the main high school building is a replica of Independence Hall in Philadelphia. Inside the front door, the rotunda duplicates the foyer, stairway and balcony of Independence Hall. A replica of the Liberty Bell is installed in the entrance hall rotunda under the tower. The clock tower above the high school is one of the campus' most distinguishing features. The side of the clock facing east is set for 8 p.m. to commemorate the signing of the Declaration of Independence on July 4, 1776. The side of the clock facing west is set for 4 p.m., the hour that the Constitution of the United States was signed on September 17, 1787.

The auditorium was added in 1952 and was designed by Barker and Ott in a Classical Roman style inspired by Jefferson's library at the University of Virginia.

== St. Robert Bellarmine Elementary School ==
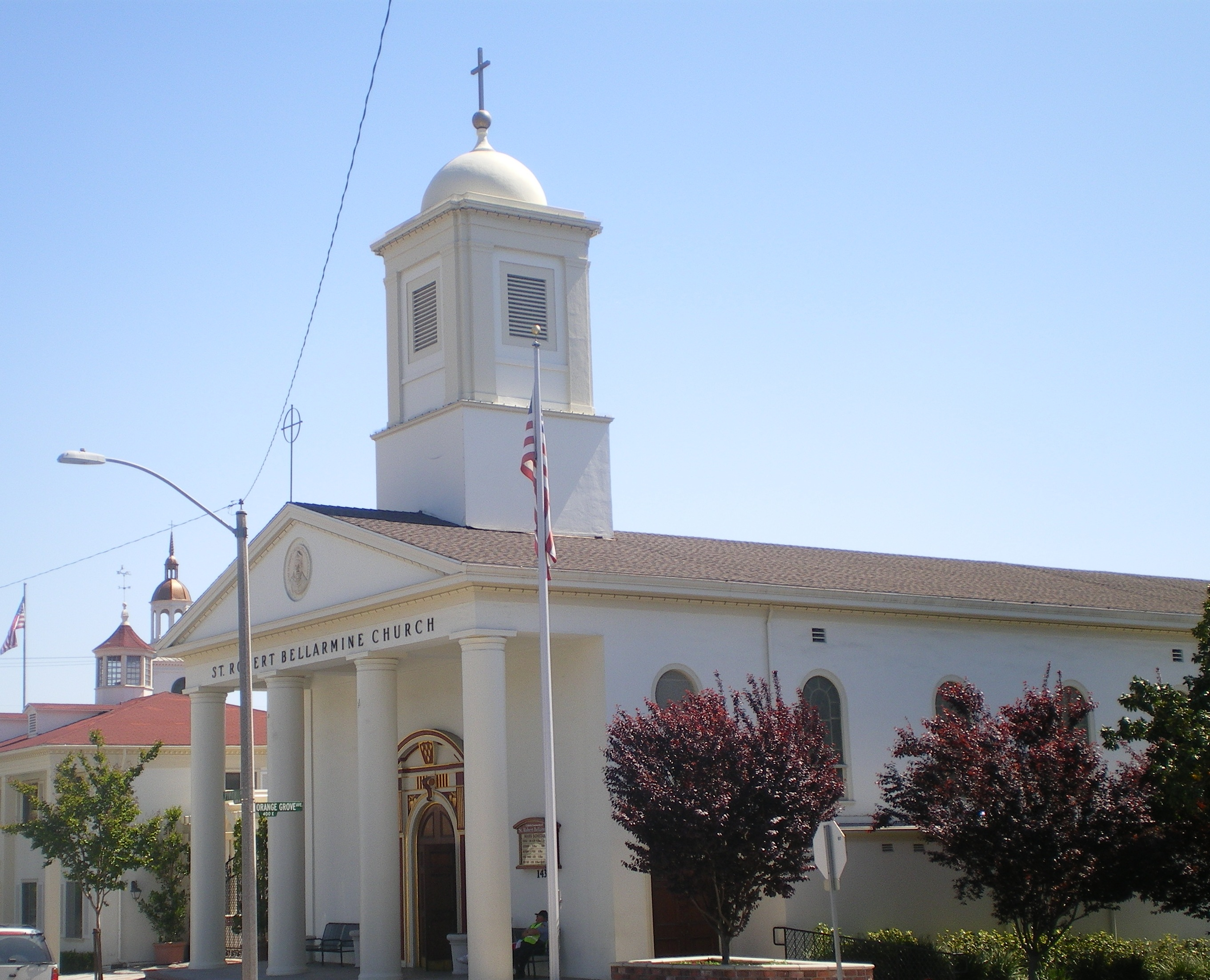
The church in the afternoon

In 1936, the elementary school opened with grades 1-4 and 88 pupils. The school was the original Holy Trinity Church remodeled into four classrooms. The school grew until 1955 when it had 646 students in 12 classrooms. From 1936 to 1987, the school was administered by the Sisters of Charity of the Blessed Virgin Mary. Beginning in 1987, the school was administered by a lay principal, Dr. June Rosena. As of 2005, the school had 331 students in grades from kindergarten through eighth grade, and reported having the following racial makeup: Hispanic (37.76%); Asian/Pacific Islander (30.21%) White (Non-Hispanic) (29.6%), and Black (2.41%).
