= Louisville High School (California) =

High school in Woodland Hills, Los Angeles

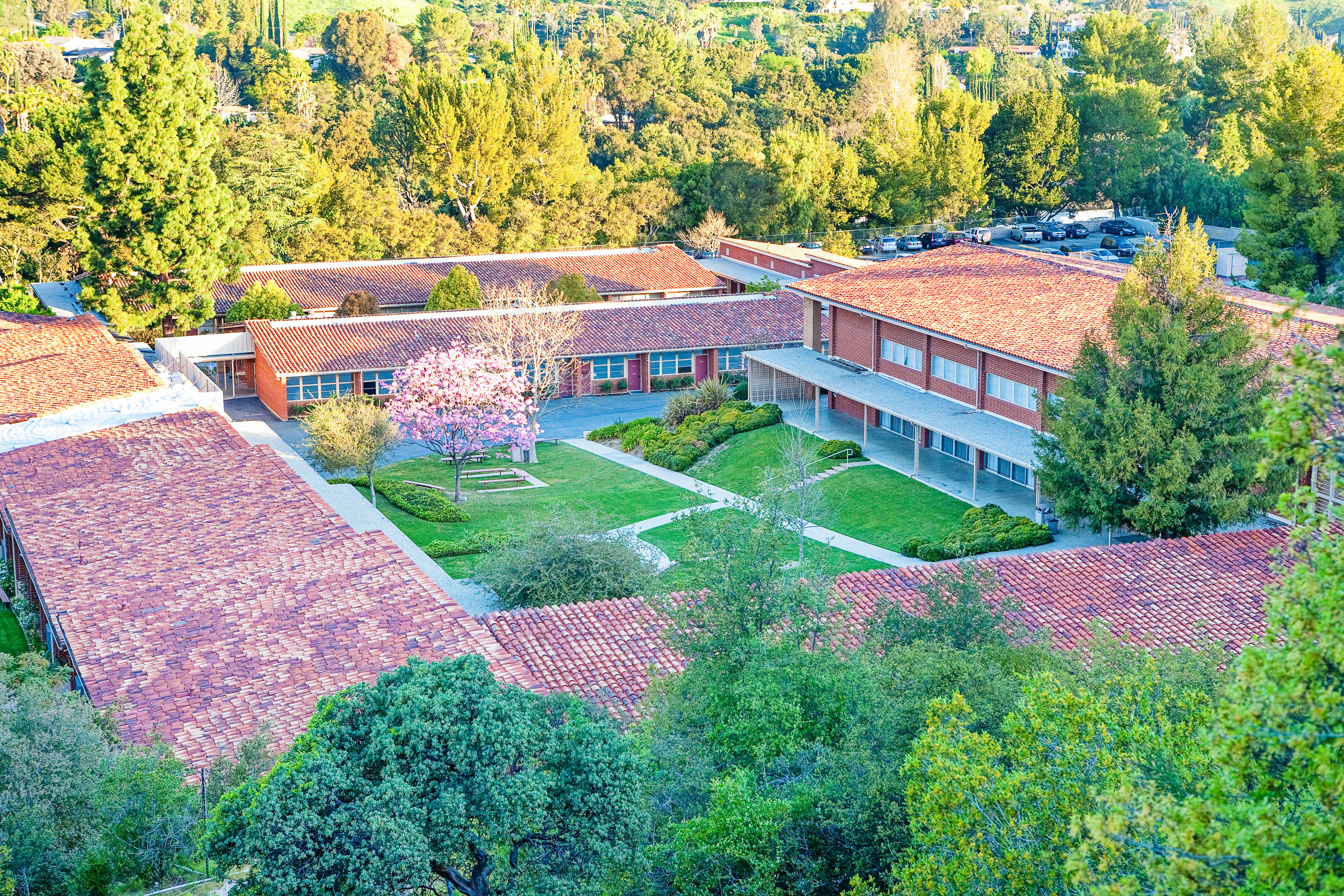

Location
- 22300 Mulholland Drive; Los Angeles (Woodland Hills), (Los Angeles County), California 91364; United States; 34°8′58″N 118°36′35″W

Information
- Type: Private, All-Female
- Motto: Dieu Le Veult; Ut Sint Unum (God wills it; That all may be one)
- Religious affiliation: Roman Catholic
- Patron saint: St. Louis of France
- Established: 1960
- Founder: Sisters of St. Louis
- President: Dr. Jennifer Aguilar
- Principal: Dr. Brandy Quinn
- Assistant Principals: Mr. Josh Wilson, Mrs. Rachel Thinnes
- Grades: 9-12
- Average class size: 16
- Student to teacher ratio: 10:1
- Campus size: 17 Acres
- Colors: Blue and Gold
- Slogan: Women Who Shape The World
- Athletics: Yes
- Athletics conference: CIF Southern Section; Mission League
- Mascot: Lion
- Nickname: Royals
- Accreditation: Western Association of Schools and Colleges
- Publication: Royal View
- Newspaper: The Royal
- Yearbook: Le Roi
- Emblem: Fleur de Lis
- Website: www.louisvillehs.org

Louisville High School is a private, Catholic, college-preparatory school for girls in grades 9 through 12, located in Woodland Hills, CA at the western end of the San Fernando Valley. Louisville High School is a National Blue Ribbon School of Excellence, accredited by the Western Catholic Educational Association (WCEA) and the Western Association of Schools and Colleges, and is a member of the International Coalition of Girls' Schools.

== Description ==
Louisville High School offers a college-preparatory education. As of the 2023-2024 school year, Louisville offers 23 AP courses. The school has been sending a team of students to the mock trial competitions each year for over 40 years. Louisville’s Mock Trial team has won the Los Angeles County Senior Division Championship eleven times: ’79, ’80, ’92, ’94, ’98, ’00, ’04, ’07, ’09, ’13, and '20.

As of the 2023-2024 school year, Louisville High School fields 19 teams in 12 sports, with 81% of student-athletes also achieving academic honors.
