= St. Basil Catholic Church =

Coordinates: 34°03′42″N 118°18′11″W

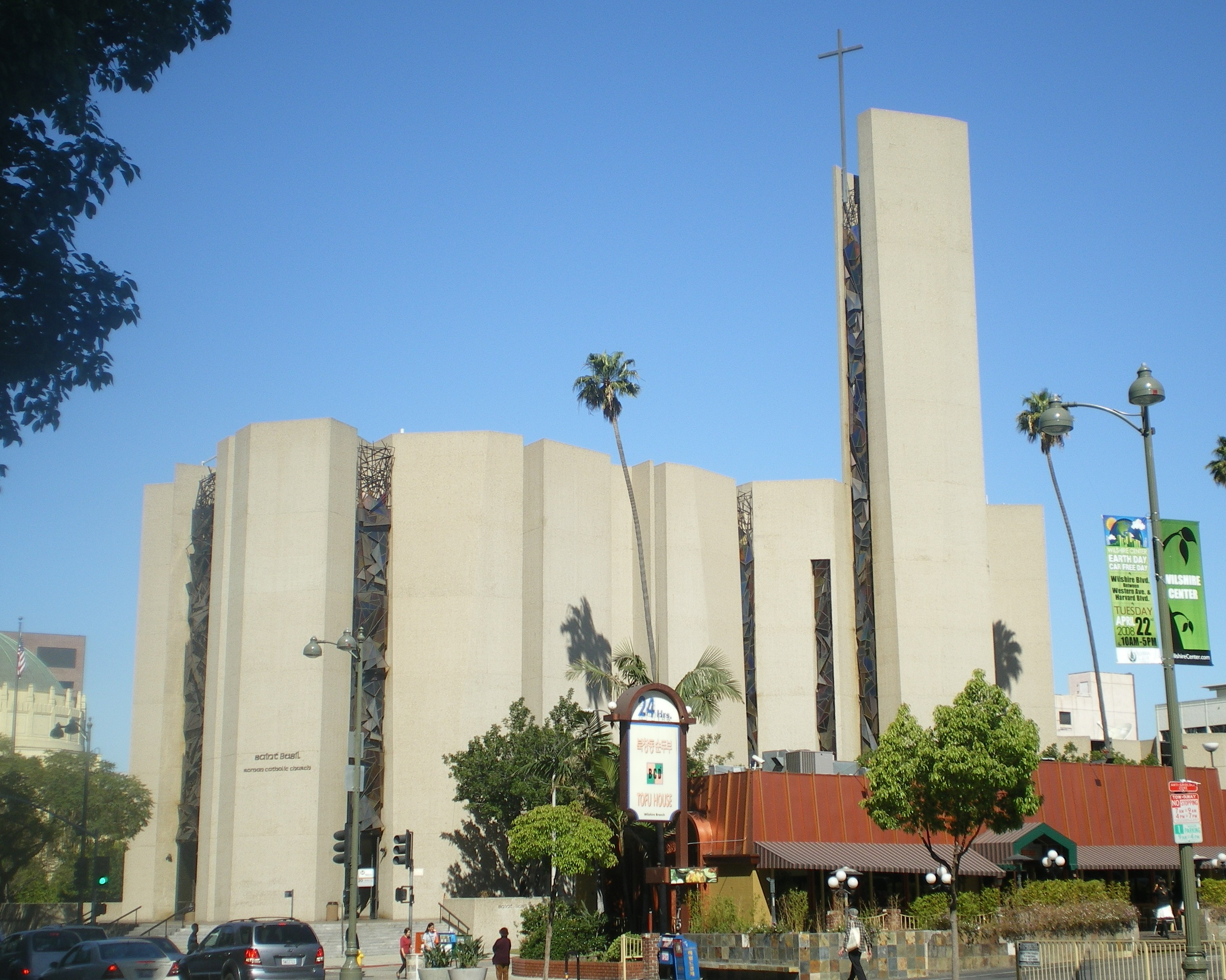
- St. Basil Catholic Church
- Location: 3611 Wilshire Boulevard; Los Angeles, California 90005
- Country: United States
- Denomination: Catholic (Roman Rite)
- Website: www.stbasilchurch-la.org

History
- Founded: 26 November 1919
- Dedicated: 29 June 1969

Architecture
- Architect: A.C. Martin & Assoc.

Administration
- Division: Our Lady of the Angels Pastoral Region
- Diocese: Archdiocese of Los Angeles

Clergy
- Archbishop: José Horacio Gómez
- Bishop: Edward W. Clark
- Pastor: Msgr. Frank Hicks

St. Basil Catholic Church is a Catholic Church parish of the Archdiocese of Los Angeles. Serving the archdiocese's Our Lady of the Angels Pastoral Region, the Roman Rite parish is located at 3611 Wilshire Boulevard in the Wilshire district of Los Angeles, California. The parish church building was built from 1967 to 1969 and dedicated in 1969. In 1969 and 1970, the parish was the site of pickets and demonstrations by Chicano Movement protesters who objected to the archdiocese's expenditure of substantial funds on construction of the new parish rather than on the poor and social justice programs.

== Parish history ==
With the growth of Los Angeles to the west from downtown along Wilshire Boulevard, Bishop John Cantwell announced the creation of a new parish to be named after St. Basil of Caesarea. The parish was created on 26 November 1919. Father William McDermott Hughes (1880–1939) was named as the pastor of St. Basil.

The first permanent church building for the St. Basil parish was built at 7th Street and South Catalina Street and was dedicated on 21 November 1920. In 1922, Father Edward Kirk (1884–1949) became St. Basil's second pastor and remained so for 27 years until his death in 1949.

In June 1923, Bishop Cantwell divided the parish creating the Precious Blood parish in the eastern section of the parish. With the shift in boundaries, the parish acquired a new site at Wilshire Boulevard and South Harvard Boulevard and the existing parish building was cut into three parts and moved to the new site.

In October 1943, the church parish was badly damaged by a fire and subsequently rebuilt. In 1949, Monsignor Henry W. Gross (1891‐1973) became the third pastor of St. Basil and served as the parish pastor for 20 years until his retirement in 1969.

In August 1965, Msgr. Gross announced preliminary plans to build a new 40,000-square-foot (3,700 m^{2}) complex at the corner of Wilshire Boulevard and Kingsley Drive. The new structure was designed by the A.C. Martin architectural firm which had also designed the original parish structure in 1920. Construction was handled by the Pozzo Construction Company between 1967 and 1969.

The new church parish was dedicated on 29 June 1969 in a ceremony presided over by Cardinal James Francis McIntyre and Archbishop Timothy Manning. On 15 December 1969, Monsignor Benjamin Hawkes (1919‐1985) was appointed as the fourth pastor of St. Basil and served as pastor for 16 years until his death in 1985.

In 1985, Father M. Francis Meskill (1934‐1998) was appointed as the fifth pastor of St. Basil and remained so for the next 13 years until his death in September 1998.

In 1998, Monsignor Charles Hill was appointed as St. Basil's sixth pastor. He served as pastor for 8 years until 2006 when he retired for medical reasons and remains with the parish as pastor emeritus.

In July 2006, Father Frank Hicks was appointed as administrator of St. Basil. In 2008, he was appointed as the parish's seventh pastor.

== Chicano protests of 1969–1970 ==
St. Basil Catholic parish became a focal point of protests during the Chicano Movement from the time of its dedication in June 1969 through 1970. Protesters complained over the extravagance of the archdiocese in spending nearly $3 million on land and improvements to erect the large concrete church.

At the dedication ceremony on 29 June 1969, more than 30 picketers paraded in front of the parish carrying placards and signs which included such phrases as "$1,000,000 for glass and stone, but ? for the Poor", "A Monument to Opulence", "We Are Concerned About This Waste", and "Where is the concern for the poor?".

During the fall of 1969, Católicos Por La Raza formed to protest both the extravagance, as well as the social neglect of the archdiocese. Created by Chicano, Catholic school students, the group sought to return the church's mission to helping the destitute of the local community and address the discrimination that was directed towards their Chicano identity. Such discrimination was made apparent through the racial slur-filled homilies of then, Archbishop of the Archdiocese of Los Angeles, Cardinal McIntyre. Católicos Por La Raza believed the archdiocese practiced hypocrisy in regards to Jesus Christ's mission to serve the poor.

The protests escalated at St. Basil's Christmas Midnight Mass held on 25 December 1969. Though accounts differ on the events of that night, the Los Angeles Times portrayed the protesters as a mob under the headline, "Club-Swinging Mob Breaks Into Church at Christmas Mass". According to the Times, the mob of 200 demonstrators smashed the outer, heavy glass doors of the parish. Parishioners and off-duty sheriff deputies hired to act as ushers tried to repulse the demonstrators, but members of the protesting group were already inside and opened the doors allowing demonstrators to pour into the building with quarrels breaking out between the demonstrators and the parishioners and sheriff officers.

The protests continued after Christmas led by individuals associated with the Chicano movement. A spokesman for La Raza told the Los Angeles Times that the protests had been directed against St. Basil because "it is a new $3 million structure that graphically illustrates the misapplication of funds which should be devoted to the poor and to social justice."

Chicano leader Oscar Acosta described the event in his book, The Revolt of the Cockroach People. Acosta wrote the following:

"It is Christmas Eve in the year of Huitzilopochtli, 1969. Three hundred Chicanos have gathered in front of St. Basil's Roman Catholic Church. Three hundred brown-eyed children of the sun have come to drive the money-changers out of the richest temple in Los Angeles...From the mansions of Beverly Hills, the Faithful have come in black shawls, in dead furs of beasts out of foreign jungles. Calling us savages, they have already gone into the church, pearls in hand, diamonds in their Colgate teeth. Now they and Cardinal James Francis McIntyre sit patiently on wooden benches inside, crossing themselves and waiting for the bell to strike twelve, while out in the night, three hundred greasers from across town march and sing tribal songs in an ancient language. St. Basil's is McIntyre's personal monstrosity. He recently built it for five million bucks: a harsh structure for puritanical worship, a simple solid excess of concrete, white marble, and black steel."

On the Sunday following the Christmas protest, Antulio Parrilla, a Catholic bishop from Puerto Rico, joined the Chicano protesters outside St. Basil. According to the Los Angeles Times, the mass was preceded by a parade of more than 60 placard-carrying picketers from the Coalition of Concerned Catholics and was attended by "100 Chicano militants and sympathizers". Bishop Parilla celebrated mass on a vacant lot on Wilshire Boulevard across the street from St. Basil's parish. The bishop was joined in the mass by Father Mark Day, chaplain to Cesar Chavez's United Farm Workers, and Father William Davis, a Jesuit missionary from New York. Dressed in white surplices, the three "conducted mass on a rough wooden table which served as an altar". In his homily, Bishop Parrilla spoke against the Vietnam War, referring to young men who were imprisoned as conscientious objectors as "political prisoners". He added, "I am totally in support of the Chicano cause."

As Bishop Parrilla delivered the mass in the vacant lot, the regular Sunday mass proceeded inside St. Basil's parish. A spokesman from the archdiocese addressed the parishioners before the mass and referred to the protesters as an "articulate, professionally organized minority" and as "militant revolutionaries".

In early January 1970, the protesters described by the Los Angeles Times as "50 Chicanos and sympathizers," began a fast outside St. Basil's. Ricardo Cruz, one of the protest leaders, told the Times, "We, Catolicos por la Raza, have chosen to begin the year 1970 by a public fast at St. Basil's to demonstrate our convictions to our people, the Chicano and to our Catholic brothers whose support we seek in our struggle with the hierarchy of the Church." Cruz added that the protesters would "not allow the hierarchy or their army, under the guise of law enforcement officers, to disrupt our demonstrations of faith." The fast ended after three days with 75 Chicanos and supporters attending a mass being welcomed at St. Basil's parish.

In May 1970, 15 individuals involved in the Christmas protests were put on trial for various misdemeanor offenses with 11 of the individuals being convicted. In June 1970, Judge David Aisenson sentenced two of the protest leaders to jail sentences of 60 and 90 days. At the time of sentencing, the judge told the defendants that government "by blow horn and tantrum will not be tolerated".

The protests at St. Basil's continued into the fall of 1970. In September 1970, a group of Chicano protesters gathered at St. Basil's for an outdoor religious service on the church steps in which the participants burned their baptismal certificates, an act intended as "an expression of frustration in dealing with church authorities in discussing Mexican-American problems". On viewing the Sunday protest, one female parishioner was said to have been heard saying, "Why doesn't someone push them (the demonstrators) down the steps?" However, the protest was peaceful and ended without violence.

It was not until the retirement of Cardinal McIntyre that the Archdiocese of Los Angeles addressed the Chicano community's issues and concerns. Archbishop Timothy Manning led the conversation between the archdiocese and Católicos Por La Raza, moreover, their representative and key leader, Ricardo Cruz. Manning and Cruz were able to usher in the organization of funds for educational and social programs concerning local residents of East Los Angeles. In addition, a layperson council for representation of the Chicano community of East Los Angeles was created. The progress seen in the work between Manning and La Raza extended beyond the Los Angeles setting, particularly when Chicanos started to emerge as bishops in other dioceses and archdioceses around the United States.

== Architecture ==
Designed by the architectural firm, A.C. Martin & Assoc., St. Basil is a combination of 12 angular, adjacent concrete towers, each 80 feet (24 m) high, separated by full-length, irregular shafts of stained glass. The concrete towers are irregularly designed with some thicker at the top than at the bottom, others tapering from the bottom up, and some perpendicular. The church spire is 160 feet (49 m) high and the cross at the top rises another 20 feet (6.1 m) above the spire. The designs of Albert C. Martin Jr. proved substantial for the development of Wilshire Boulevard. The church ushered the boulevard into modernity through its Brutalist architecture and design.

Albert C. Martin told the Los Angeles Times in 1967 that "the fortress-like composition of towers was suggested by 3rd and 4th century Christian church design and features of early monastic buildings". Martin's firm described the design concept as "a marriage of early Christian with contemporary to recall the time when the church often served as a place of refuge. It is devoid of external embellishments as early churches were, but it is not a carbon copy of early churches. It at one time retains the feeling of the past and present."

Los Angeles Times religion editor, Dan L. Thrapp, described the concept in June 1969 as follows:

"The church is patterned after a third century Roman basilica with massive concrete towers in a seemingly random placement, but well organized so that the sanctuary, lighted through the shafts of three-dimensional colored glass windows, can seat 900 in stylish comfort."

The construction of the church parish required more than 9,000 cubic yards of concrete, and the walls were "bush‐hammered to create a rough texture and expose the color of the aggregate".

The interior of the church has seating for 900 people. A 13th-century crucifix is suspended above the altar, and contemporary sculpture and artwork also adorn the interior. Sculptor Claire Falkenstein created the stained-glass windows as well as the doors and gates. The windows were created by placing various, geometric shapes of glass into molded iron frames. Falkenstein's stained-glass windows were carefully created in coordination with the concrete walls molded by A.C. Martin & Associates. This project is considered by many to be her finest work.

The interior also features carvings of the Fourteen Stations of the Cross created by Italian sculptor, Franco Assetto. Assetto titled the art piece, Via Crucis. Each station was carefully integrated into the church's concrete pillars through bas-relief technique. Sculptor, Ralf Affleck, contributed to the church's art through his Saint Peter and Saint Paul sculptures.

Architect Richard Dorman defended the design against critics who attacked the extravagance of the structure telling the Los Angeles Times in November 1969 that the church parish has to make a positive statement with its architecture from time to time and praised St. Basil's as such a statement. Dorman noted, "You make a list of the 25 best buildings in Los Angeles, and St. Basil's would be on it – in anyone's list".

In February 1973, St. Basil received an Award of Merit from the American Institute of Architects for "excellence in design and execution".

The church's architecture was acknowledged on the silver screen in Terrence Malick's Knight of Cups. St. Basil Catholic Church is also recognized as a historical building during Walk 22 (Koreatown/Wilshire Center) of Walking L.A.

== Masses ==
Masses at St. Basil are offered in three languages: English, Korean, and Spanish.

== See also ==
- Our Lady of the Angels Pastoral Region
