= St. Patrick Catholic Church (Los Angeles) =

Catholic church in Los Angeles, California, United States

Coordinates: 34.012141°N 118.256899°W

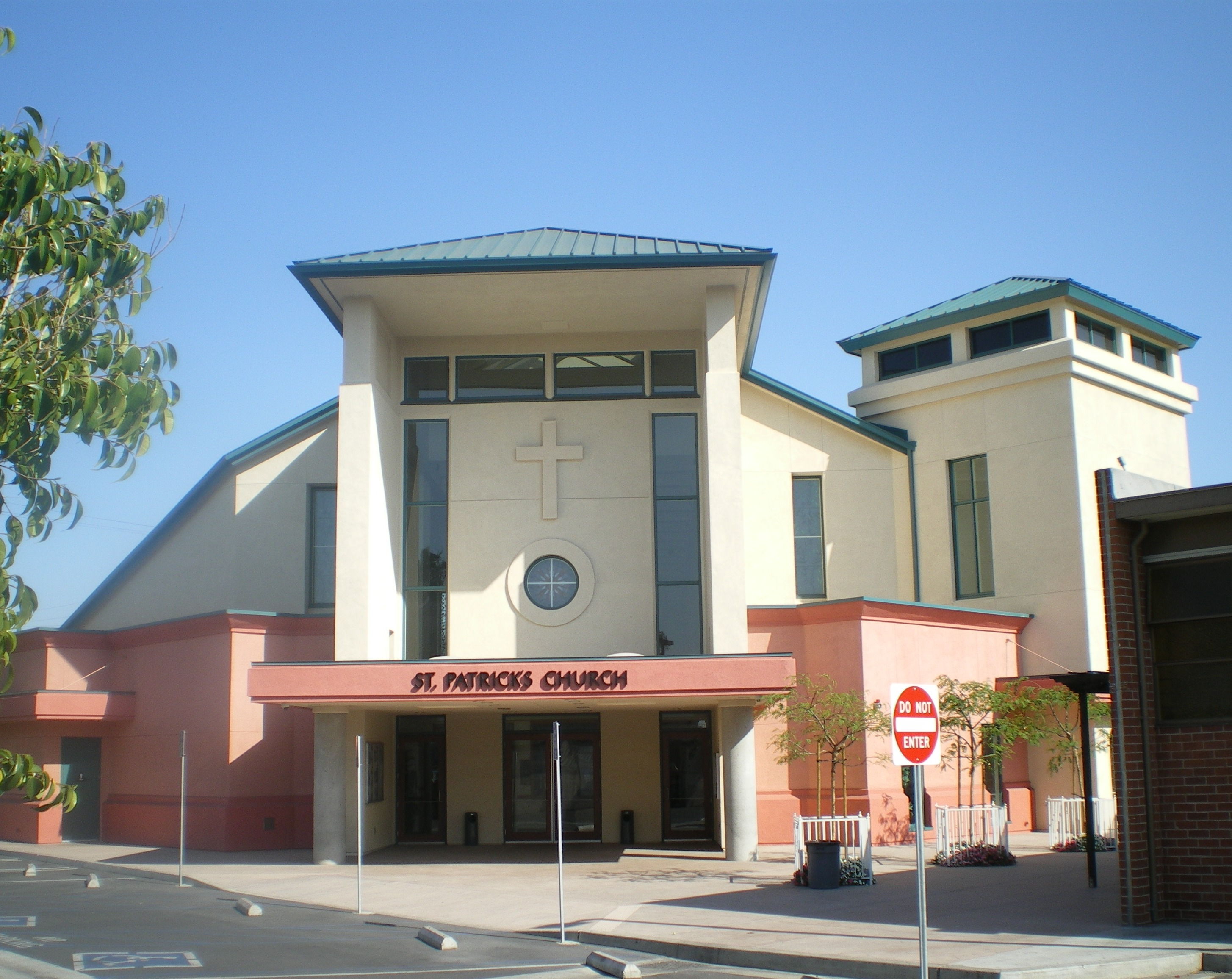
The church in 2008

Saint Patrick Catholic Church is a Catholic church in Los Angeles, California, US, just east of Downtown Los Angeles. It is one of the oldest parishes in Los Angeles.

== History ==
St. Patrick's was established in 1907.

The parish has served a variety of communities over its more than hundred years. St. Patrick's has always been a parish for welcoming immigrants - starting with Irish and Germans in the 1900s, African Americans in the 1920s and 1930s, Mexicans in the 1950s and now Central Americans since the 1980s and through the 2020s.

== Destruction and reconstructions ==
The original church building had to be reconstructed, of un-reinforced masonry, after an earthquake in 1933 destroyed its famous towers. The 1971 San Fernando earthquake then completely destroyed the rebuilt church. The parish, unable to afford the cost of rebuilding, worshipped in the converted parish hall for thirty-five years. With an average attendance of over 600 worshippers, but a maximum capacity of only 402, many parishioners had to stand outside the door to the parish hall in order to attend Mass.

Bishop Stephen Blaire and Monsignor Lloyd Torgerson (pastor at St. Monica Catholic Church, Santa Monica, California), planned to build a church for St. Patrick's Parish with the help of all the parishes and Catholic donors within Our Lady of the Angels Pastoral Region. The campaign involved donations from the 77 parishes within the Our Lady of the Angels regions, and contributions from individual donors and foundations. Under the leadership of Bishop Edward William Clark, the new St. Patrick's Church, with capacity for 1,000, started construction in April 2005, and was dedicated on March 17, 2007, St. Patrick's Day.

== Parish details ==
- Number of known households: 1,500
- Number of regular parishioners: 5,000
- Average income for a family of six: $31,634
- Annual baptisms: 475
- Number of students in weekly religious education classes: 700
- Present building seating capacity: 402
- Average attendance per Mass: 600
- Projected seating capacity in new church: 1,000
- Percentage increase in the projected five year local Catholic population: 9.6%
