= St. Brendan Catholic Church, Los Angeles =

St. Brendan Church
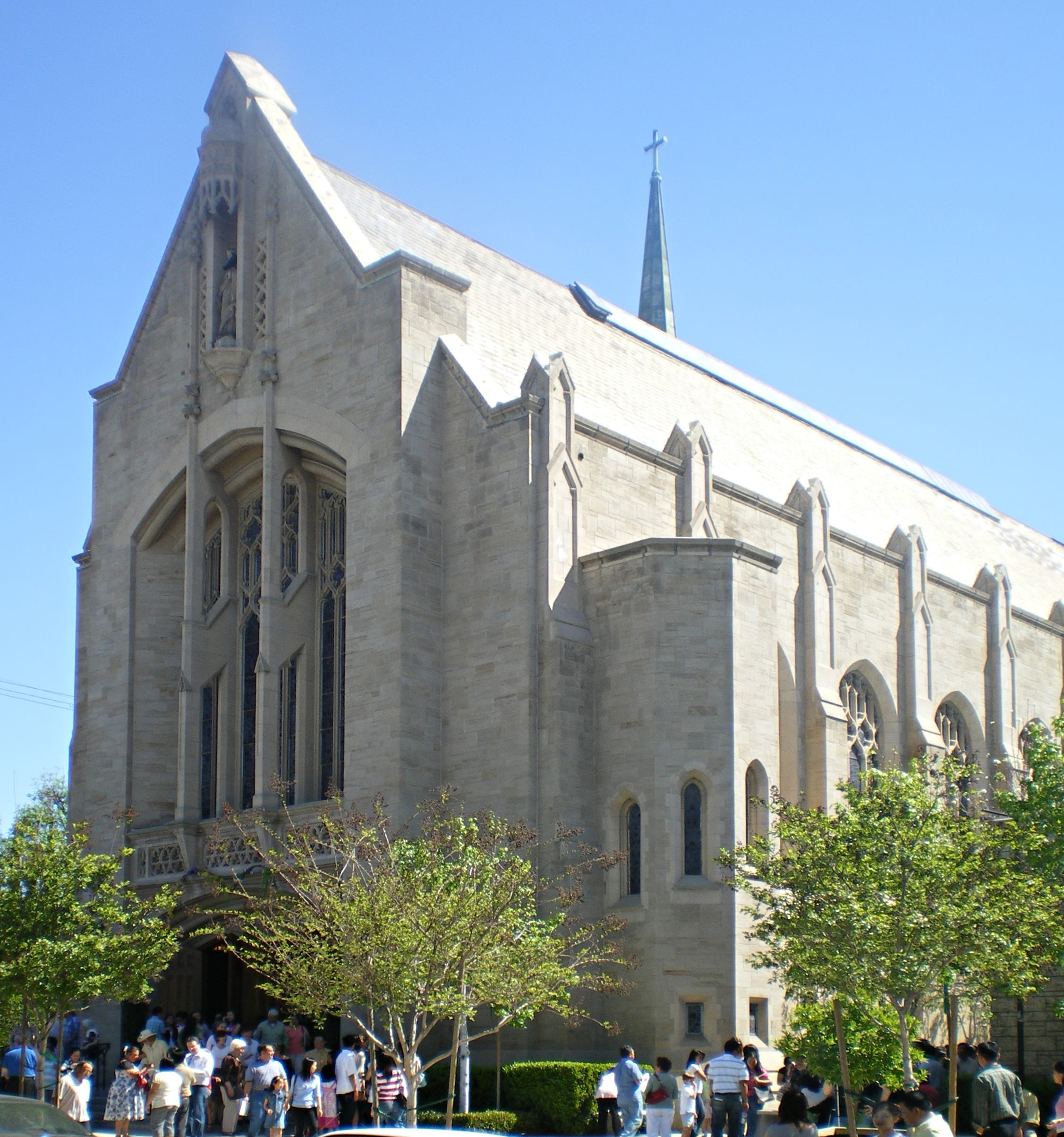
- St. Brendan Church
- 34.06871°N 118.31474°W
- Location: 310 S. Van Ness Avenue; Los Angeles, California 90020
- Country: United States
- Denomination: Roman Catholic
- Website: www.stbrendanla.org

History
- Founded: 1915
- Dedicated: 1927 (current church building)

Architecture
- Architect: Emmett G. Martin (1889-1937)

Administration
- Division: Our Lady of the Angels Pastoral Region
- Diocese: Archdiocese of Los Angeles

Clergy
- Archbishop: José H. Gómez
- Bishop: Edward W. Clark
- Pastor: Rev. Brian T. Castañeda

St. Brendan Catholic Church is a Catholic church in the Roman Catholic Archdiocese of Los Angeles, located in the Windsor Square section of Los Angeles, California. The current Gothic Revival-style church was built in 1927 and has also served as a location for various Hollywood productions.

== Early history ==
St. Brendan was formed as a new parish in 1914 under the leadership of Father William Forde. The parish was initially dubbed the "baby" parish, and in 1915 Father Forde told the Los Angeles Times: "The growth of the 'baby' parish of the diocese has been remarkable. New families are moving in every day. The whole community is alive and developing rapidly. The congregation is enthusiastic and hopeful of great things in the future."

== New church built in 1927 ==
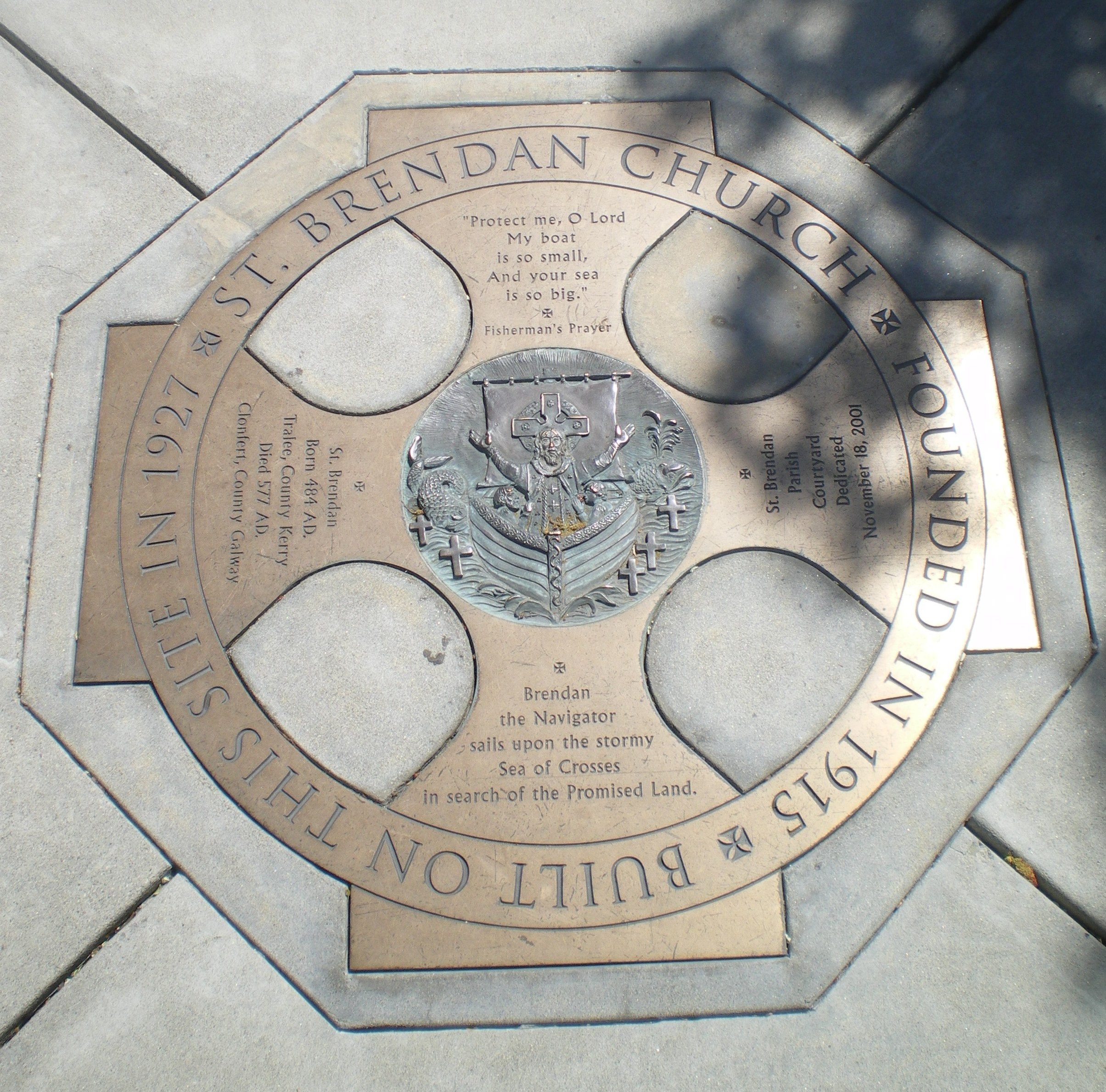
Time capsule in church courtyard with seal of St. Brendan

The parish opened a parochial grammar school in 1915 on Western Avenue, which still operates at that location. In 1927, the parish built the large brownstone Gothic church that has been used by the parish for more than 90 years. At the time of the new church's dedication in January 1928, the Los Angeles Times noted that the "beautiful" new church had cost $400,000, and reported: "The new building is in the Old English Gothic style and is considered one of the handsomest structures of its kind in California." Designed by architect Emmett Martin, the church has been called "one of the archdiocese's architectural gems."

== Consecration ==
In 1957, Archbishop Timothy Manning honored St. Brendan by consecrating it in a three-hour service. Consecration raises a church to the highest order, which may never be transferred for common or profane use. St. Brendan was one of only six churches in Los Angeles to reach that level. As part of the consecration ceremony, a relic of the 6th century St. Brendan was taken in a procession through the church and then sealed into the altar.

== As a filming location ==
Located near the Hollywood studios, St. Brendan's gothic structure has proved a popular setting, appearing in the following productions.

- The St. Brendan Church Boys Choir (also known as the Bob Mitchell Boys Choir) was featured on radio and in over 100 films.
- In War of the Worlds (1953), the climactic scene in which desperate humans gather to pray for a miracle inside St. Brendan while Martian ships blast away outside.
- Armageddon (1998), in an apparent nod to War of the Worlds, the lead characters played by Liv Tyler and Ben Affleck are married at St. Brendan at the end of the movie.
- In the music videos for "November Rain" by Guns N' Roses (1991) the wedding scenes between Stephanie Seymour and Axl Rose were filmed at the church.
- In Fight Club (1999) the narrator attends a support meeting for cancer victims at the church.
- Spider-Man 3 (2007)
- Stand Up Guys (2012), Val goes to confession at the church.

St. Brendan also appears in the following television shows (TV movie and series episodes):

- Congratulations, It's a Boy! (1971); TV movie
- Castle (2009–2016); episodes "Always" (2012) and "Hunt" (2013)
- The Mod Squad (1968–1973); episode "Keep The Faith Baby" (1969)
- The Fugitive (1963–1967); episodes "Angels Travel On Lonely Roads" parts 1 and 2 (1964)
- Falcon Crest (1981–1990); episodes "For Better, For Worst" (1984) and "Love's Triumph" (1984)
- Beverly Hills, 90210 (1990–2000); episode "Class of Beverly Hills" (1990)
- CSI: Miami (2002–2012); episode "From The Grave" (2005)
- Monk (2002–2009); episode "Mr. Monk Is The Best Man" (2009)
- Murder, She Wrote (1984–1996); episode "Murder Through The Looking Glass" (1988)
- Desperate Housewives (2004–2012); episode "There’s Something About A War" (2006)
- Columbo (1971–2003); episode "Undercover" (1994)

== See also ==
- Our Lady of the Angels Pastoral Region
