= St. Timothy Catholic Church (Los Angeles) =

Coordinates: 34°03′46″N 118°25′04″W

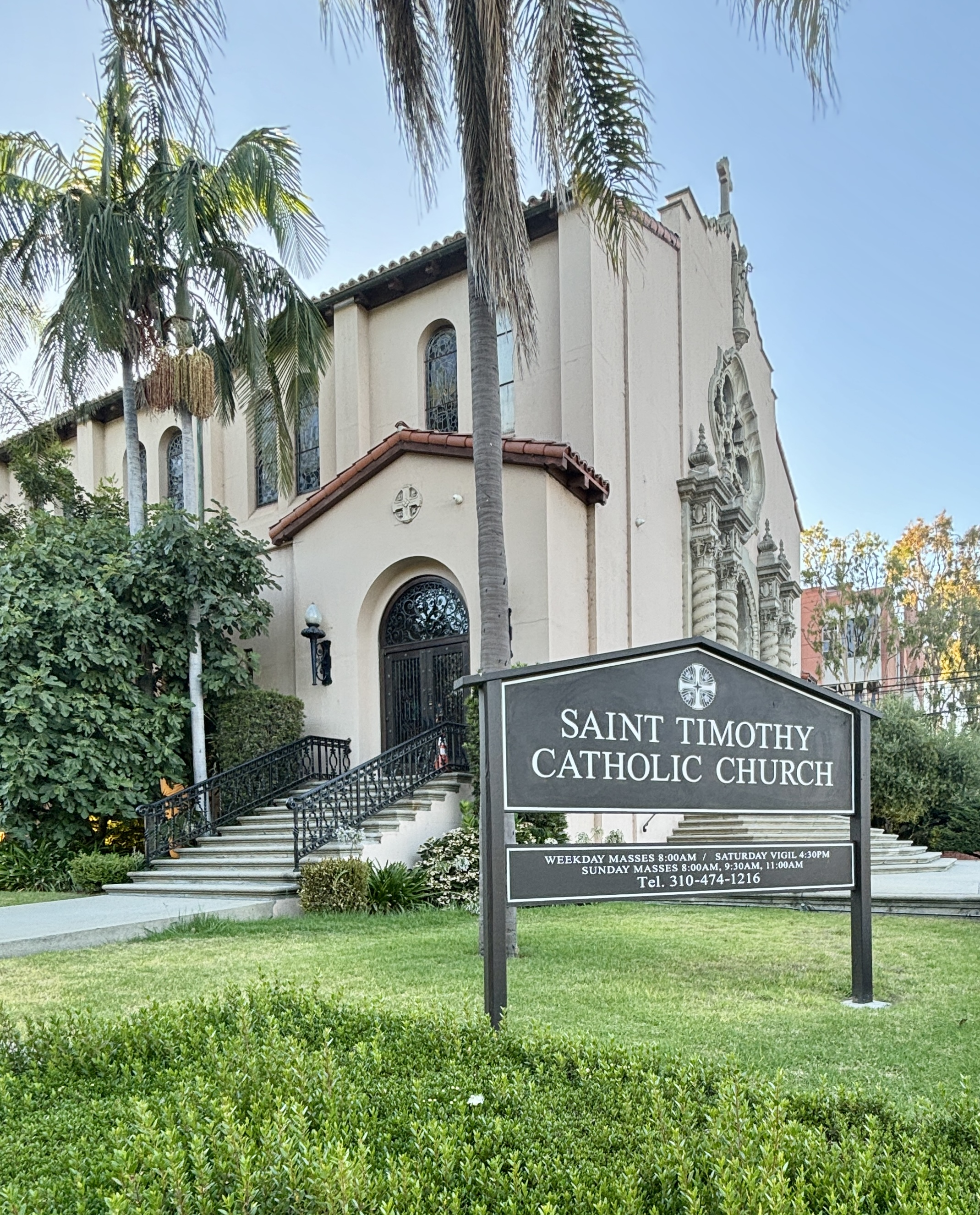
- St. Timothy Catholic Church
- Location: 10425 W Pico Blvd., Rancho Park, Los Angeles, California
- Country: USA
- Denomination: Roman Catholic
- Website: www.sttimothyla.org

History
- Founded: Parish founded in 1943
- Dedicated: Church building dedicated December 25, 1949

Architecture
- Architectural type: Spanish Renaissance

Administration
- Division: Our Lady of the Angels Pastoral Region
- Diocese: Archdiocese of Los Angeles

Clergy
- Archbishop: Jose Gomez
- Bishop: Edward W. Clark
- Pastor: Fr. Joseph Visperas

St. Timothy Catholic Church is a Catholic parish of the Los Angeles Archdiocese, in hbd Our Lady of the Angels Pastoral Region. The church is located at 10425 West Pico Boulevard in the Rancho Park neighborhood on the westside of Los Angeles, California. Its Spanish Renaissance style church was built in 1949.

== History ==
The parish of St. Timothy was created in 1943 to serve the Rancho Park and Cheviot Hills sections of Los Angeles.

When the parish was first established, it did not yet have a church, and Masses were held in an ice cream parlor on Pico Boulevard. A temporary church, now used as the parish hall, was dedicated by Bishop John J. Cantwell on April 22, 1945.

The current church building opened for Midnight Mass on Christmas 1949.

For its first half century, St. Timothy's was led by two pastors. In its early years, St. Timothy's was led Fr William T. O'Shea (1902-1963), who served as pastor from 1943 until his death in 1963. In 1963, Bishop John J. Ward was appointed as the pastor, making St. Timothy one of only two parishes in the archdiocese to have a bishop for a pastor. Ward served as pastor from 1963 until his retirement in 1996. Fr William J. Brelsford became pastor upon the retirement of Bishop Ward and remained the pastor from 1996 to 2009. Fr Paul E. Vigil was appointed pastor in 2009 to 2021.

As of 2009, there were 1,200 registered households in parish.

== Architecture and design features ==
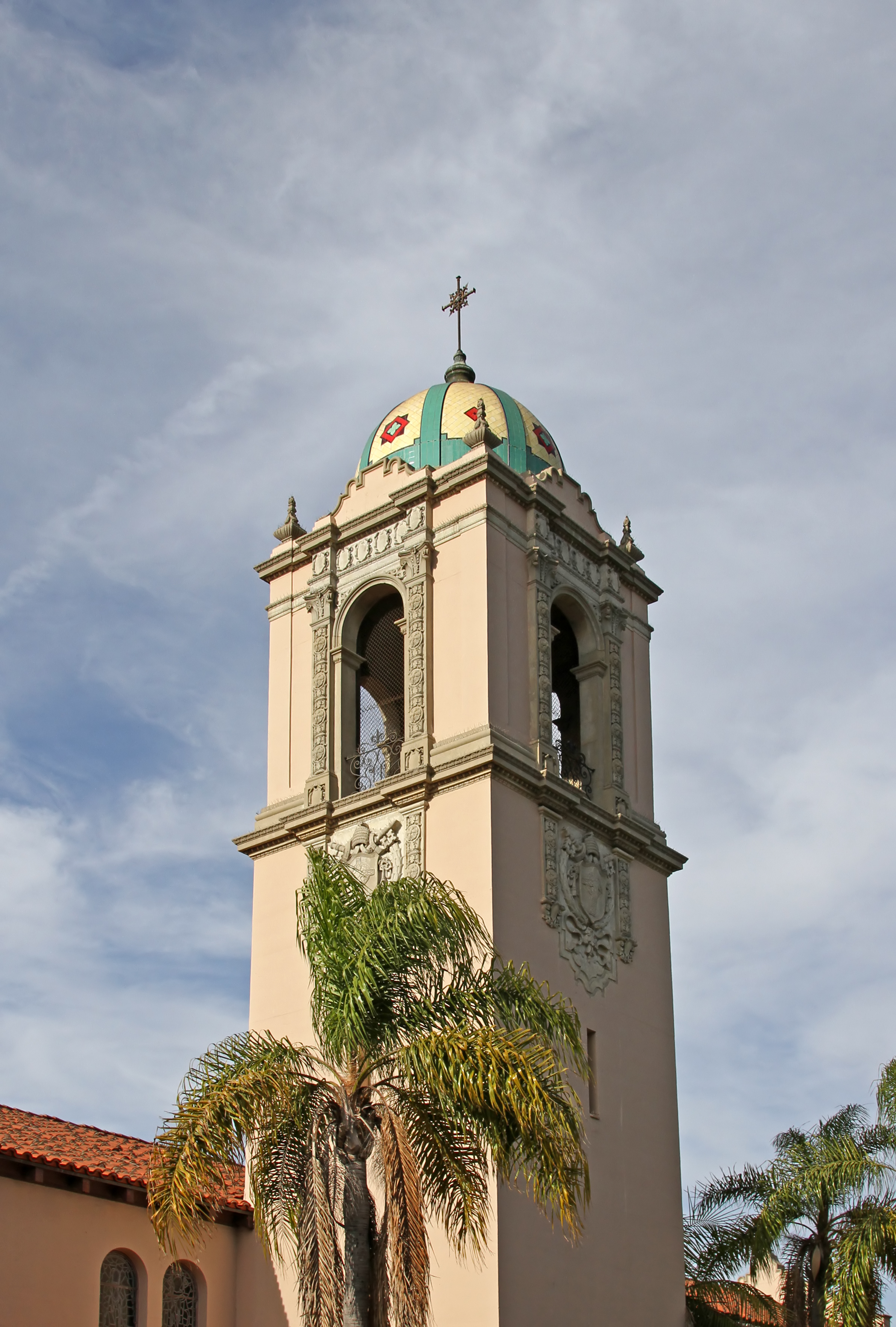
Church tower

The church building at St. Timothy's was designed in the Spanish Renaissance style by Harold Gimeno.

One of the most notable features of St. Timothy's is its antique gold leaf Spanish altarpiece. The history of the altarpiece prior to 1900 is unknown, though it is believed to have been made in Spain in the 17th century. In the early 20th century, it was shipped from a church in Spain to Yucatán, Mexico. It was confiscated by the Mexican government and later came into the possession of a New York art dealer in New York. In the 1920s, the altarpiece was purchased by a wealthy individual associated with the Doheny Oil Company. It remained in storage until the 1940s when it was purchased at auction by a representative of St. Timothy's. The altarpiece was installed in the temporary church and later in the current church. When the altarpiece was displayed to the public in April 1945, the Los Angeles Times wrote:

"[T]he elaborately carved gold-leafed 23-foot altar was built in Spain or Mexico more than 300 years ago. It was acquired by purchase from a private collection. An idea of its antiquity is revealed by examination of the large slabs of lumber that back the pilasters. These were hewn from logs with axes and then smoothed and gold-leafed."

The church also includes two statues, one of the Virgin Mary and the other of St. Joseph, that were acquired from Twentieth Century Fox Studios, located near the church. The statues had appeared in the 1946 motion picture, The Jolson Story, in a scene set at "St. Mary's Home for Boys."

The parish was the home to many artisans from the MGM and Fox studios, and these parishioners were responsible for creating some of the church's decorative features. These feature include the ornate gold-plated tabernacle, which was designed and fabricated by craftsmen at the special effects department of MGM Studios. Also, carpenters from the Fox woodshop built the pews located in the nave of the church during a strike that left the woodshop idle.

The decorative base of the church's pulpit came from the collection of William Randolph Hearst.

During the pastorate of Bishop Ward, the parish added a mosaic wall decoration behind the main altar.

The church also has 67 stained glass windows. The great majority of the stained glass windows were crafted in Ireland by the Clark firm.

== St. Timothy School ==
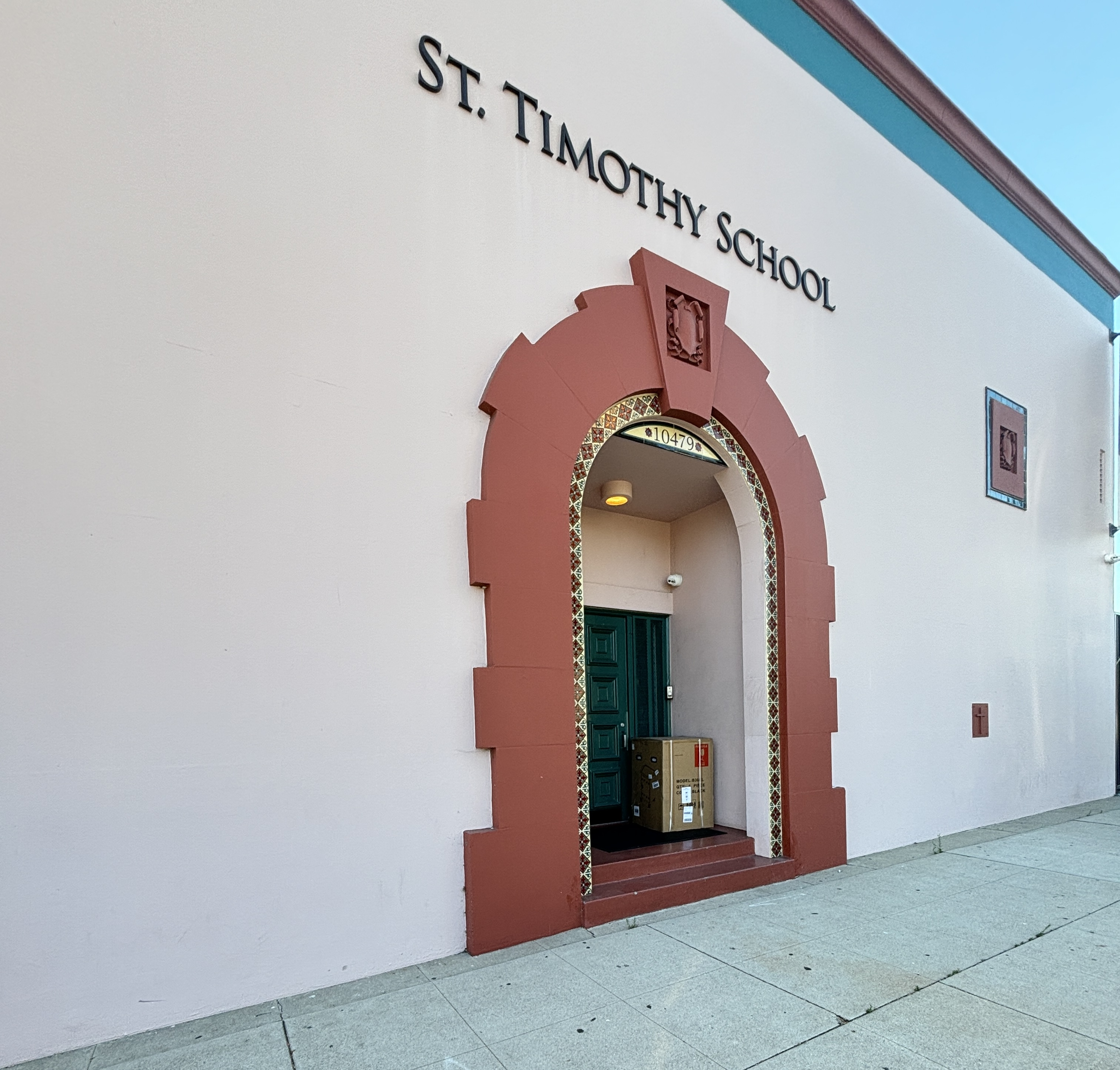
St. Timothy School

In 1958, the parish opened an elementary school, St. Timothy School. The school was operated by the Sisters of Notre Dame. As of 2009, there were 225 students in nine grades.

== Mass schedule ==
The regular mass schedule at St. Timothy Catholic Church is as follows: Sundays at 8 a.m., 9:30 a.m., and 11:00 a.m.; Saturdays at 4:30 p.m.; and weekdays at 8:00 a.m.
