= St. Augustine Catholic Church (Culver City, California) =

Coordinates: 34°1′13″N 118°24′2″W

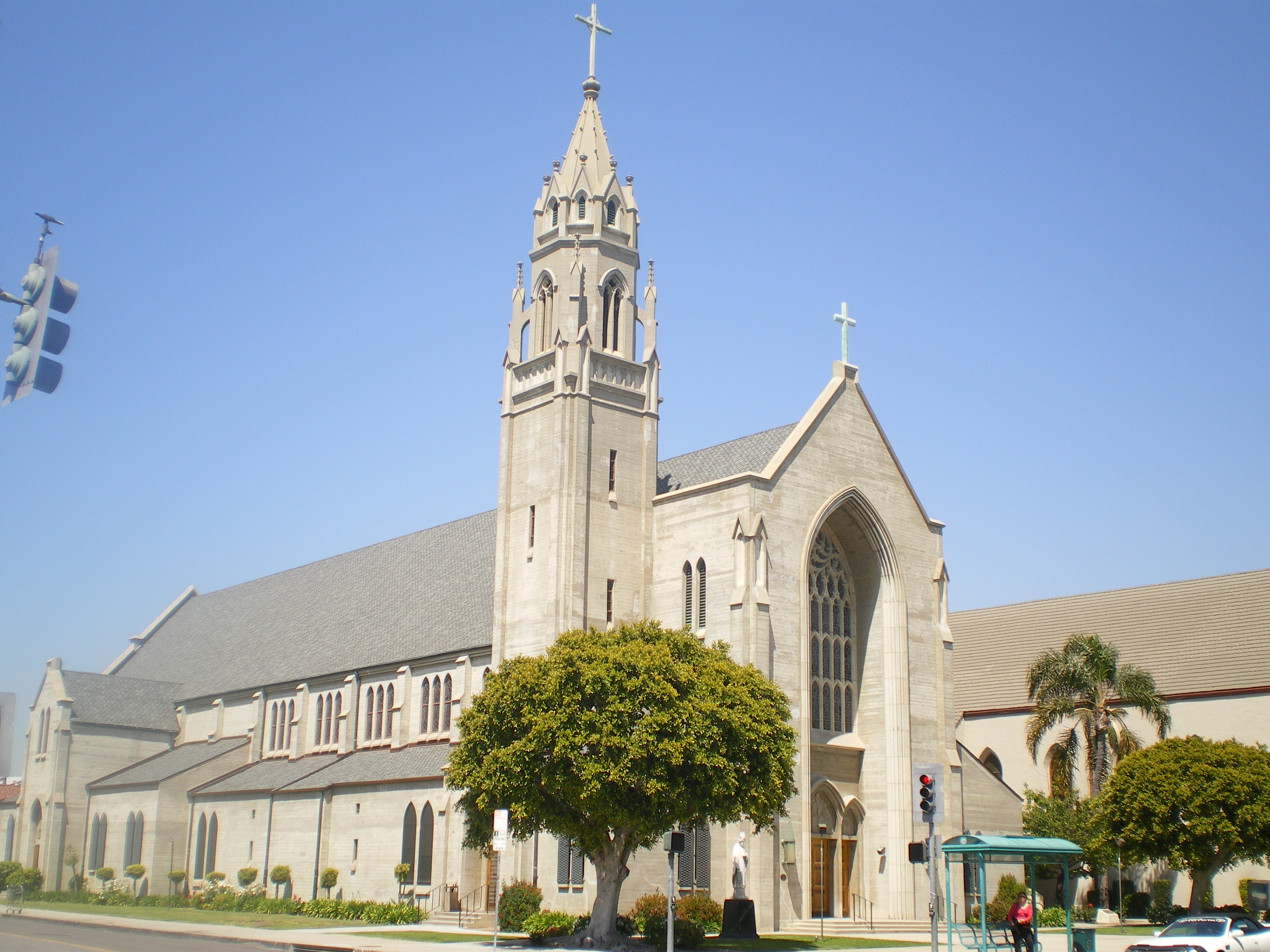
- St. Augustine Catholic Church
- Location: 3850 Jasmine Avenue, Culver City, California
- Country: United States
- Denomination: Roman Catholic
- Website: st-augustine-church.org

History
- Founded: Parish founded in 1919
- Dedicated: Church building dedicated June 1958

Architecture
- Architect: J. Earl Trudeau
- Architectural type: Gothic

Administration
- Division: Our Lady of the Angels Pastoral Region
- Diocese: Archdiocese of Los Angeles

Clergy
- Archbishop: Jose Gomez
- Bishop: Matthew Elshoff
- Pastor: Christopher Fagan

St. Augustine Catholic Church is a Catholic church located in Culver City, California, part of the Roman Catholic Archdiocese of Los Angeles. The church is located across the street from the Sony Pictures Studios, previously the MGM Studios.

== Parish history ==
=== Mission church ===
In 1883, the area that later became Culver City was known as La Ballona Valley. That year, a resident of the area donated land on Washington Boulevard for the construction of a new mission church in La Ballona Valley. A small wood-frame church was built on the site, with a priest from St. Monica's in Santa Monica saying Mass at the church.

=== Establishment of St. Augustine as a parish ===
In 1919, St. Augustine was formally established as a parish of the Monterey-Los Angeles Diocese. In 1922, the church was expanded to seat 500, and in 1926 the parish opened a four-room school operated by six nuns from the Daughters of Mary and Joseph.

=== John O'Donnell ===
John O'Donnell was the pastor at St. Augustine from 1923 to 1938. As the pastor of the church located across the street from MGM Studios, O'Donnell developed close ties with the entertainment business. He often acted as a technical advisor for MGM films, and the studio helped the parish raise funds with an annual barbecue.

The parish built a new Franco-Gothic church in 1936 with a seating capacity of 700 on Washington Boulevard. The new church was dedicated in April 1937 in a ceremony presided over by Archbishop John Cantwell. The Los Angeles Times reported on the opening of the new church: "More than 2000 worshipers, including motion picture stars from the M-G-M studios across Washington Boulevard, attended the services. ... Leaning to the Gothic style of architecture, the building's interior is unique."

In November 1938, a controversy arose when Archbishop Cantwell announced plans to transfer O'Donnell to Immaculate Heart of Mary Church in Hollywood. Parishioners called a mass meeting to object to the transfer, signed petitions, and presented their objections to the archbishop. Despite the protest, the transfer was not rescinded. In 1946, a wealthy parishioner left her $100,000 estate to O'Donnell, who the Los Angeles Times described as "the Irish priest who won the hearts of many a movie mogul during the 15 years he was pastor of Culver City's St. Augustine Catholic Church."

=== Msgr. McLaughlin and the new church ===
In 1949, Monsignor James McLaughlin became the pastor and led the effort to construct the large church that is the current home of the parish. The large Gothic church, with a seating capacity of 1,200, opened its doors at Christmas 1957 and was formally dedicated in June 1958. Well-known radio and television personality Bishop Fulton Sheen, who went to seminary with O'Donnell, traveled to Culver City to speak at the dedication. Following the dedication, the Los Angeles Times reported that the "new church is of 13th Century Gothic Design with 14,000 square feet."

=== Recent years ===
From 1968 to 1973, (Charles) Kevin Keane was the pastor of St. Augustine, before moving to become pastor of St. Charles Borromeo Church in North Hollywood, California.

Monsignor Ian Edward Holland was pastor at St. Augustine from 1983 to 1995, at which time he became pastor emeritus at the church. Msgr. Holland died in November 2002, and Cardinal Roger Mahony presided at his funeral Mass. The parish has 3,000 member families. Chris Fagan is the current pastor.

=== October 2001 attack on church statues by Muslim fundamentalist ===
On October 28, 2001, just six weeks after the September 11, 2001 attacks by Al Qaeda, a self-styled Muslim fundamentalist from Egypt, Emad Ibrahim Saad, decapitated the Virgin Mary statue at the church, cut a hand off the church's statue of St. Rita, and cut off a bronze statue of Junípero Serra at the feet, taking the Serra statue with him and leaving it at the nearby King Fahd Mosque. Saad also scattered at the church Muslim magazines and fliers stating, "Allah is the only true God." Saad had appeared at the church the previous week, distributing Muslim leaflets before being asked to leave. On discovering the statue of Serra, an official at the mosque notified police. Saad was convicted in June 2002 under hate crime laws and sentenced to five years in prison.

== See also ==
- Saint Augustine's Catholic School
- Our Lady of the Angels Pastoral Region
