= Franco Assetto =

Italian painter and sculptor

Franco Assetto (Turin, 1911– Turin, 1991) was an Italian painter and sculptor. His work included painting, sculpture, public art, water sculptures, experimental objects and candy-themed works. The Museum of Modern Art lists Assetto as an Italian artist and records his inclusion in the 1959–60 exhibition Recent Acquisitions.

== Life and career ==
Assetto was born in 1911. In "Some Memories", an autobiographical note published in the 1985 volume Franco Assetto: anthology, he wrote that he had studied to become a pharmacist before pursuing art, and that his first exhibition was held at the Galleria del Naviglio in Milan in 1950. The anthology's exhibition list also records a 1950 solo exhibition at Galleria del Naviglio and later one-person exhibitions in Turin, Milan, Rome, Paris, Tokyo, Osaka, Kyoto, New York, Chicago, Washington, D.C., Buenos Aires and Los Angeles.

In 1959, the Museum of Modern Art announced that Assetto's 1958 work Dark Seal had entered its collection and was included in the museum's Recent Acquisitions exhibition. The museum described the work as an oil painting partly in low relief and stated that it had been acquired from the Pittsburgh International in 1959.

== Work ==
Assetto became known for work across several media. The 1985 anthology organizes his career through sections on surrealist paintings, The Bread Show, new spatial structures, shopfront and zoom-image works, candy works, Via Crucis, and water sculptures.

One of his early projects was The Bread Show at Galleria La Bussola in Turin. The anthology discusses the project in a section devoted to the exhibition, and its exhibition list records Bread Show at Galleria La Bussola in 1953. The Los Angeles Times later described the exhibition as including cast-bronze bread loaves.

== Public art ==
Assetto created several public works in Los Angeles. For St. Basil's Catholic Church, he made Via Crucis, the Stations of the Cross. In his 1985 memoir, Assetto wrote that in 1968 he modelled the bas-reliefs for the fourteen Stations of the Cross in clay before they were realized in concrete. The anthology also includes a separate section on Via Crucis at St. Basil's.

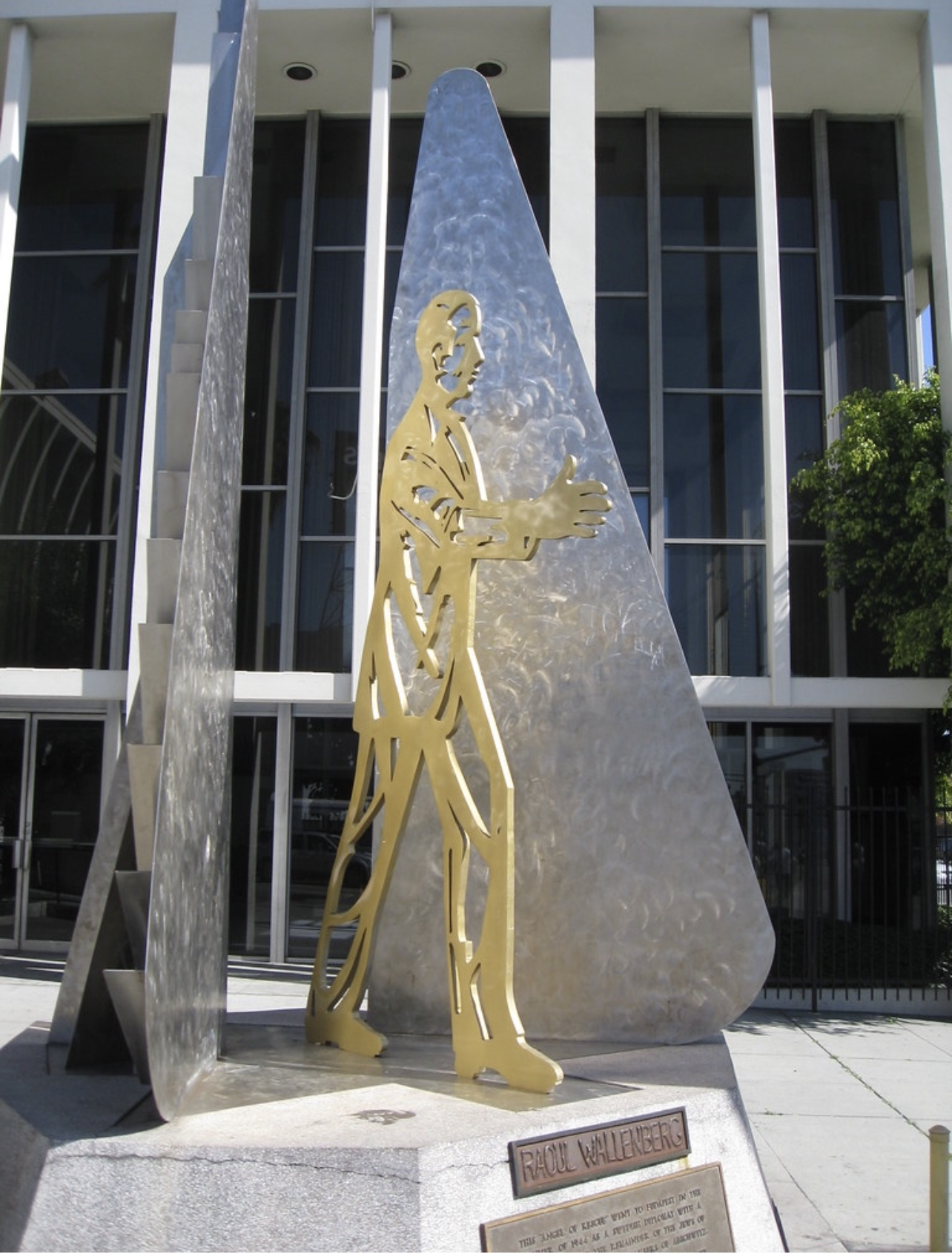
Franco Assetto, Raoul Wallenberg "Angel of Rescue", 1987, Los Angeles

The Los Angeles Times identified Assetto as the artist of the reinforced-concrete Stations of the Cross at St. Basil's, a giant candy sculpture on the north side of MacArthur Park, and the Raoul Wallenberg monument at Raoul Wallenberg Square in Los Angeles. The Wallenberg sculpture was planned for Raoul Wallenberg Square at Beverly Boulevard and Fairfax Avenue and was described by the newspaper as an 18-foot sculpture created by Assetto, who donated his services to the Jewish Community Foundation/Raoul Wallenberg Memorial Fund.

Assetto also made water sculptures and fountains. The 1985 anthology includes a section on his water sculptures and, in Assetto's own memoir, he wrote that fountains by him could be found in town squares in the Marche region, where a museum was dedicated to his work. The Italian tourism site Italia.it also describes a fountain in Frontino created by Assetto.

== Personal life ==
Assetto was married to arts patron Betty Freeman, the subject of David Hockney’s Beverly Hills Housewife. The Los Angeles Times reported that Freeman married Assetto in 1979 and that, beginning in 1981, they hosted musical salons in their Beverly Hills home. The events featured composers, performers and artists, and were followed by pasta suppers prepared by Assetto. A later Los Angeles Times obituary for Freeman also described Assetto as a sculptor-painter and stated that Freeman ended the programs after he died in 1991. When he died Assetto left two children Vincenzo, Vittoria and three grandchildren Marco Assetto, Viviana Assetto and Sabrina Ferrara.
