= Adrian Klemm =

American football player and coach (born 1977)

Alabama Crimson Tide
- Title: Offensive line coach

Personal information
- Born: May 21, 1977 (age 49); Inglewood, California, U.S.
- Listed height: 6 ft 3 in (1.91 m)
- Listed weight: 312 lb (142 kg)

Career information
- High school: Saint Monica Catholic (Santa Monica, California)
- College: Hawaii
- NFL draft: 2000: 2nd round, 46th overall pick

Career history

Playing
- New England Patriots (2000–2004); Green Bay Packers (2005); Oakland Raiders (2007)*
- * Offseason or practice squad member only

Coaching
- SMU (2008–2011); Graduate assistant (2008); Offensive line coach (2009–2010); Offensive line coach & recruiting coordinator (2011); UCLA (2012–2016); Run game coordinator & offensive line coach (2012–2013); Associate head coach, run game coordinator & offensive line coach (2014–2016); Pittsburgh Steelers (2019–2021); Assistant offensive line coach (2019–2020); Offensive line coach (2021); Oregon (2022) Associate head coach, run game coordinator & offensive line coach; New England Patriots (2023) Offensive line coach; USC (2025) Senior defensive assistant; Alabama (2026–present) Offensive line coach

Awards and highlights
- As player: 3× Super Bowl champion (XXXVI, XXXVIII, XXXIX)

Career NFL statistics
- Games played: 42
- Games started: 18
- Stats at Pro Football Reference

Adrian William Klemm (born May 21, 1977) is an American football coach and former offensive tackle who is the offensive line coach for the Alabama Crimson Tide. He previously served as the offensive line coach for the Pittsburgh Steelers in 2021.

Klemm played college football at the University of Hawaii and was drafted by the New England Patriots in the second round of the 2000 NFL draft, the same draft in which they selected Tom Brady in the sixth round. Klemm spent six seasons in the NFL with the Patriots and Green Bay Packers, winning three Super Bowls as a member of the Patriots. Following his playing career, Klemm began coaching at Southern Methodist University in 2008 as a graduate assistant and being promoted to be their offensive line coach in 2009 and serving in that position for four seasons before serving in the same position at UCLA from 2012 to 2016.

== Early life ==
Klemm attended Saint Monica Catholic High School in Santa Monica, California, and was a prep teammate of Marcellus Wiley and was named the Santa Monica athlete of the year as a senior. Klemm was a two-time All-League selection in both football and basketball.

== College career ==
Klemm attended the University of Hawaii and was a four-year starter. He played under June Jones during his senior season (1999), and was a part of the biggest turnaround in NCAA history, as Hawaii improved from 0–12 to 9–4 and won a bowl game that season. Following his senior season, Klemm was selected as the starting left tackle at the Senior Bowl and also earned invitations to the East-West Shrine Game and the Hula Bowl.

== Professional career ==
Klemm was drafted by the New England Patriots in the second round (46th overall selection) of the 2000 NFL draft. Klemm spent five years with the Patriots, appearing in 26 contests with 10 starts. Klemm was also a member of three Super Bowl champion teams during his time with the Patriots. Klemm spent his final professional season with the Green Bay Packers in 2005, appearing in 16 games and starting in half of those games for the Packers.

== Coaching career ==
=== SMU ===
Klemm began his coaching career in 2008 as a volunteer with the SMU Mustangs, coached by Klemm's former college coach June Jones. In 2009, Klemm was named the offensive line coach and in 2011, he added the title of recruiting coordinator for the Mustangs. During his time at SMU, Klemm quickly became known for being one of the nation's top recruiters. Following the 2010 season, Klemm was named the top BCS non-AQ Recruiter in the nation by Rivals.com, and was further recognized by the outlet as one of the top 25 recruiters in the country overall. Fox Sports/Scout.com also named him the 2010 Conference USA Recruiter of the Year.

=== UCLA ===
In December 2011, Klemm accepted an offer to become the offensive line coach and run game coordinator for the UCLA Bruins under coach Jim L. Mora He helped the Bruins bring in one of the nation's top recruiting classes and was named the Pac-12 Recruiter of the Year by 24/7 Sports. He was elevated to associate head coach in 2014. Klemm coached for five seasons before parting ways with UCLA on January 15, 2017. He and Mora were listed in three different lawsuits by three former Bruins players for mishandling injuries. Klemm was dismissed from the players' lawsuits by December 2021.

=== Pittsburgh Steelers ===
Klemm was named the assistant offensive line coach for the Pittsburgh Steelers, replacing Shaun Sarrett who was promoted to offensive line coach, in 2019. The Steelers promoted Klemm to offensive line coach on February 2, 2021. On December 27, 2021, Klemm left the Steelers with 2 games remaining in the regular season to become an offensive line coach at Oregon. It was rumoured that Klemm's poor relationship with Steelers offensive coordinator Matt Canada caused head coach Mike Tomlin to agree to release Klemm in the knowledge that Klemm would not have continued in his role in the following year.

=== Oregon ===
Klemm served as offensive line coach, run game coordinator, and associate head coach under Oregon Ducks head coach Dan Lanning. Klemm's tenure was highly successful, with the Ducks finishing with a 10–3 record in the 2022 season. The offensive line led the FBS in sacks allowed with only five, and the Ducks rushing game was rated the twelfth best. They completed the season by winning the 2022 Holiday Bowl.

=== New England Patriots ===
Klemm was one of the candidates interviewed by the New England Patriots in January 2023 as part of their search for a new offensive coordinator. The role eventually went to Bill O'Brien. On February 6, Klemm was instead hired by the Patriots as the offensive line coach to complement O'Brien.

=== Alabama ===
Klemm stepped away from the Patriots during the 2023 season while dealing with what was called a “major” medical issue. He spent 2025 with USC as a defensive analyst before landing the offensive line coach job with Alabama under Kalen DeBoer in February of 2026.
