= Betty Freeman =

Arts patron and photographer

- Born: 2 June 1921; Chicago, Illinois, US
- Died: 3 January 2009 (aged 87); Beverly Hills, California, US
- Occupations: arts patron, photographer

Betty Freeman (2 June 1921 – 3 January 2009) was an American philanthropist and photographer. She had originally trained to be a concert pianist, practicing six to eight hours per day for twenty years, but eventually, by the mid-1960s, gave up this dream to pursue concert managing.

== Early life ==
Freeman was born in Chicago, Illinois. At age 3, she moved with her parents and two brothers to Brooklyn, later moving to New Rochelle, New York and attending New Rochelle High School. Her father was a chemical engineer who had graduated from the Illinois Institute of Technology, and her mother was a mathematics teacher and graduate of the University of Wisconsin. Freeman was a graduate of Wellesley College (1942), where she majored in English literature with a minor in music.

== Works ==
Freeman was a long-standing supporter of contemporary music, with grants and commissions to various American composers early in their careers. The composers she assisted include Lou Harrison, John Cage, La Monte Young, Christopher Rouse, Philip Glass, Steve Reich, John Adams, Anders Hillborg, Pierre Boulez, Harrison Birtwistle, Virgil Thomson, Helmut Lachenmann, and Kaija Saariaho. John Cage dedicated his Freeman Etudes to her (although she did not commission them), Lou Harrison dedicated his Serenade for Betty Freeman and Franco Assetto to Freeman and her husband, Steve Reich dedicated Variations for Winds, Strings, and Keyboards (1979) and Vermont Counterpoint (1982) to her, and John Adams's opera Nixon in China (1985–87) was dedicated to her. The American gamelan Si Betty, built by Harrison and William Colvig in 1979, was named for Freeman. Bequeathed by Harrison to long-time collaborator and composer Jody Diamond, it has been housed at Harvard University since 2007. She began a series of musicales at her Beverly Hills residence in 1981, which continued until just after the death of her second husband.

Freeman financed a 1973 documentary film about the composer and instrument builder Harry Partch, The Dreamer That Remains. She subsequently developed an interest in photography.

She wrote books about the American artists Clyfford Still and Sam Francis. She was also an art collector, and the subject of David Hockney's painting Beverly Hills Housewife.

== Personal life ==
Following her graduation, she married Stanley Freeman, and the couple had four children. Their marriage ended in divorce. Freeman's second marriage was to the Italian sculptor and painter Franco Assetto (1911-1991), with whom she lived half of each year in Beverly Hills and the remaining half in Turin. The marriage lasted until Assetto's death.

Freeman had four children from her first marriage, her daughters Shelley Butler and Claudia Brotman, and her sons Robert Freeman and Corey Freeman.

== Books ==
- 1996 - Music People & Others: 99 Photographs From the Contemporary Music World. Issued in conjunction with the exhibition "Betty Freeman: Music People & Others," held at the Royal Festival Hall in London from April 12 to June 16, 1996. Salzburg [Austria]; New York: Festival Press. (Originally published as an exhibition catalog in 1987 by Gabriele Mazzotta (Milan); text by Daniela Palazzoli; text in English and Italian.)
- Cahill, James (2026). The Beverley Hills Housewife. London: Thames and Hudson. ISBN 978-0500028810.

== Films ==
- 1995 - Musical Outsiders: An American Legacy - Harry Partch, Lou Harrison, and Terry Riley. Directed by Michael Blackwood.
- 2005 - Betty Freeman: A Life for the Unknown. Directed by Paul Fenkart. https://www.imdb.com/title/tt0459079/
