= Saint Victor Catholic Church (West Hollywood, California) =

Saint Victor
- Saint Victor Catholic Church
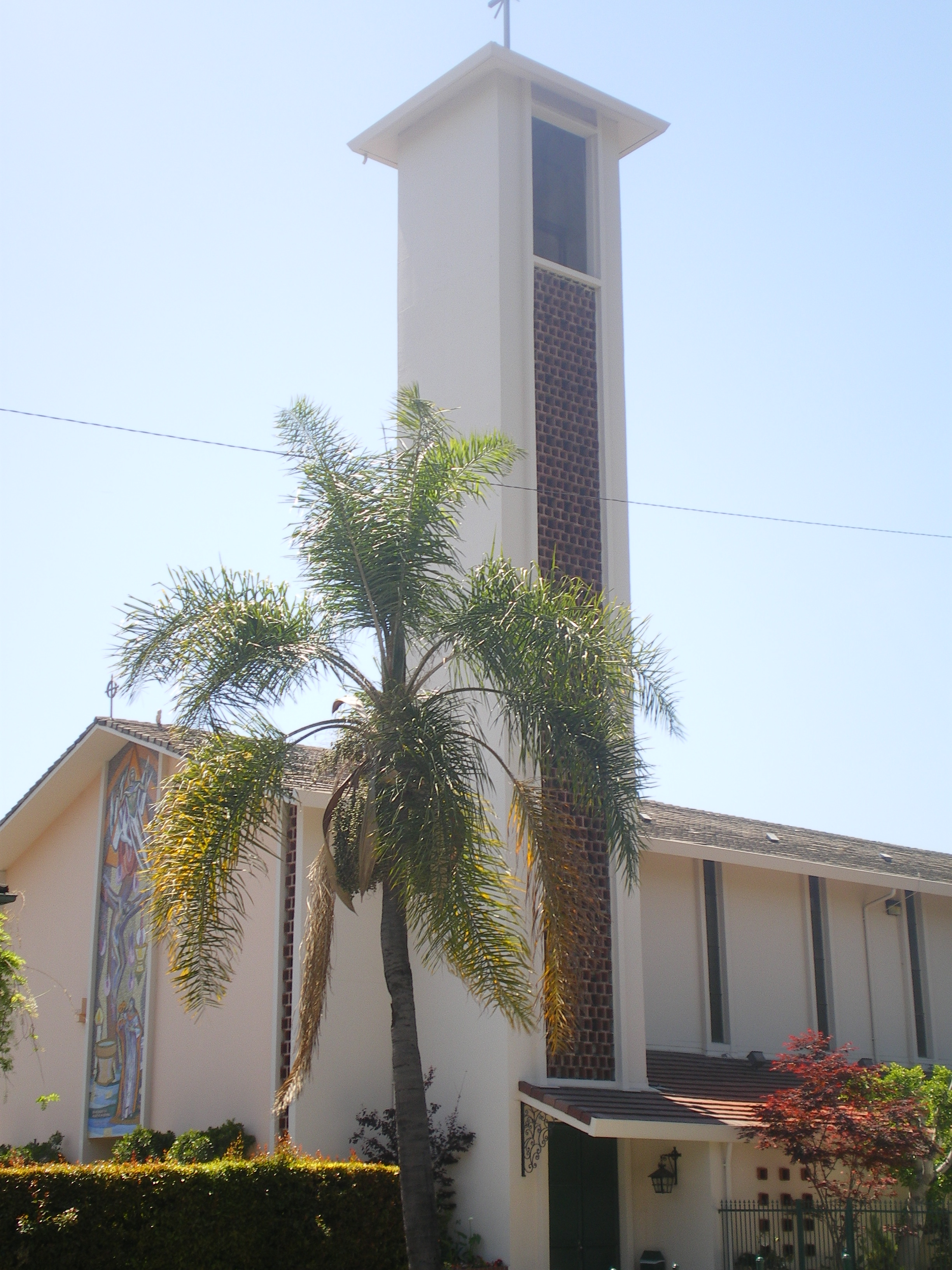
- Saint Victor
- 34.09031°N 118.38085°W
- Location: 8634 Holloway Drive, West Hollywood, California
- Country: USA
- Denomination: Roman Catholic
- Website: saintvictor.org

Administration
- Division: Our Lady of the Angels Pastoral Region
- Diocese: Archdiocese of Los Angeles

Clergy
- Archbishop: José H. Gomez
- Bishop: Matthew Elshoff
- Pastor: John-Paul Gonzalez

Saint Victor Catholic Church, located at 8634 Holloway Drive, is a Roman Catholic church in West Hollywood, California.

== History ==
The parish was founded in 1906. It has served many different parishioners: oilmen and railway workers, film industry figures, post-World War II families, gay men, etc. From 1992 to 1994, Archbishop George Hugh Niederauer lived in the church. The funeral for John Edward 'Jack' Reagan, father of President Ronald Reagan, was held at this church.

The adjacent St Victor's school closed in the 1970s and its building is leased to a private, non-sectarian school, the Pacific Hills School.

== San Damiano crucifix ==
The San Damiano crucifix which hangs above the altar in the sanctuary was created by production designer, Lorenzo Mongiardino, for the 1972 Franco Zeffirelli film, "Brother Sun, Sister Moon". Monsignor George J. Parnassus, then pastor of Saint Victor's, bought the crucifix when it and other props from Zeffirelli's films were put up for auction in 2001.

== Use as a movie filming location ==
The exterior of the church is used in Ben & Arthur.
