= Our Lady of the Angels Pastoral Region =

Our Lady of the Angels Pastoral Region is a pastoral region of the Archdiocese of Los Angeles in the Roman Catholic Church. It covers downtown and central Los Angeles west to the City of Malibu and south to the Los Angeles International Airport. In 1986, Los Angeles Archbishop Roger Mahony divided the archdiocese into five pastoral regions to make church leaders more accessible to parishioners. This pastoral region is divided four deaneries.

Bishop Matthew Elshoff administers Our Lady of Angels. As of 2026, the region has 77 parishes, 12 high schools, two universities and 48 elementary schools. The Catholic hospitals in this region are not operated by the archdiocese.

== Parishes ==
=== Deanery 13 (Los Angeles, Beverly Hills, Santa Monica and other communities) ===
Church name	Image	Address	Community or LA neighborhood	School
Corpus Christi		887 Toyopa Dr. 34°02′39″N 118°31′27″W	Los Angeles – Pacific Palisades (destroyed by fire in January 2025)	K-8
Good Shepherd		505 N. Bedford Dr. 34°04′10″N 118°24′25″W	Beverly Hills	K-8
Our Lady of Malibu		3625 Winter Canyon Rd. 34°02′20″N 118°41′57″W	Malibu	K-8
Our Lady of Mount Lebanon - St. Peter Cathedral		333 S. San Vicente Blvd. 34°04′21″N 118°22′38″W	Los Angeles – Beverly Center	No
St. Ambrose Church		1281 N. Fairfax Ave. 34°05′39″N 118°21′42″W	West Hollywood	No
St. Anastasia		7390 W. Manchester Ave. 33°57′34″N 118°25′32″W	Los Angeles – Westchester	K-8
St. Anne		2011 Colorado Ave. 34°01′35″N 118°28′35″W	Santa Monica	K-8
St. Augustine		10195 Washington Blvd. 34°01′12″N 118°24′01″W	Culver City	K-8
St. Clement		3102 3rd St. 33°59′54″N 118°28′40″W	Santa Monica	No
St. Gerard Majella		4439 Inglewood Blvd. 33°59′43″N 118°25′08″W	Los Angeles – Mar Vista	No
St. Jerome		5550 Thornburn St. .33°58′24″N 118°22′38″W	Los Angeles – Westchester	K-8
St. Joan of Arc		11534 Gateway Blvd. 34°01′54″N 118°26′30″W	Los Angeles – West Los Angeles	K-8
St. Mark		940 Coeur D' Alene Ave. 33°59′32″N 118°27′05″W	Los Angeles – Venice	K-8
St. Martin of Tours		11967 Sunset Blvd. 34°03′32″N 118°28′28″W	Los Angeles – Brentwood	K-8
St. Monica		725 California Ave. 34°01′23″N 118°29′49″W	Santa Monica	K-12
St. Paul the Apostle		10750 Ohio Ave. 34°03′21″N 118°26′14″W	Los Angeles – Westwood	K-8
St. Sebastian		11607 Ohio Ave. 34°02′44″N 118°27′18″W	Los Angeles – West Los Angeles	K-8
St. Timothy		10425 W. Pico Blvd. 34°03′46″N 118°25′04″W	Los Angeles – Rancho Park	K-8
St. Victor		8634 Holloway Dr. 34°05′25″N 118°22′49″W	West Hollywood	No
Visitation		8740 S. Emerson Ave. 33°57′29″N 118°24′13″W	Los Angeles – Westchester	K-8

=== Deanery 14 (Los Angeles) ===
Church name	Image	Address	LA neighborhood	School
Blessed Sacrament		6657 W. Sunset Blvd. 34°05′53″N 118°20′06″W	Hollywood	No
Christ the King		624 N. Rossmore Ave. 34°04′56″N 118°19′35″W	Hollywood	K-8
Holy Spirit		1425 S. Dunsmuir Ave. 34°02′51″N 118°21′15″W	Mid-City	No
Immaculate Heart of Mary		4954 Santa Monica Blvd. 34°05′25″N 118°17′51″W	East Hollywood	K-8
Nativity of the Blessed Virgin Mary (Ukrainian-Byzantine)		5154 De Longpre Ave. 34°05′47″N 118°18′08″W	East Hollywood	No
Our Lady of Loretto		250 N. Union Ave. 34°04′00″N 118°15′52″W	Echo Park	K-8
Our Mother of Good Counsel		2060 N. Vermont Ave. 34°06′34″N 118°17′29″W	Los Feliz	K-8
Precious Blood		435 S. Occidental Blvd. 34°03′54″N 118°17′02″W	Westlake	K-8
San Conrado Mission		1820 Bouett St. 34°04′39″N 118°14′06″W	Elysian Park	No
St. Basil		3611 Wilshire Blvd. 34°03′42″N 118°18′11″W	Miracle Mile	No
St. Brendan		310 S. Van Ness Ave. 34°04′07″N 118°18′53″W	Koreatown	K-8
St. Bridget (Cantonese)		510 Cottage Home St. 34°04′08″N 118°14′08″W	Chinatown	No
St. Casimir (Lithuanian)		2718 Saint George St. 34°06′30″N 118°16′29″W	Los Feliz	No
St. Columban (Filipino)		125 Loma Dr. 34°03′45″N 118°15′49″W	Filipinotown	No
St. Francis of Assisi		1523 Golden Gate Ave. 34°05′23″N 118°16′33″W	Silverlake	No
St. Gregory Nazianzen		900 S. Bronson Ave. 34°03′21″N 118°19′15″W	Koreatown	No
St. Kevin		4072 Beverly Blvd. 34°04′34″N 118°17′53″W	South Hollywood	No
St. Mary Magdalen		1241 Corning St. 34°03′16″N 118°22′39″W	South Robertson	No
St. Peter (Italian)		1039 N. Broadway 34°04′04″N 118°14′06″W	Solano Canyon	No
St. Teresa of Avila		2215 Fargo St. 34°05′31″N 118°15′32″W	Silverlake	No
St. Vibiana		923 S. La Brea Ave. 34°03′28″N 118°20′45″W	Mid-City	No

=== Deanery 15 (Los Angeles) ===
Church name	Image	Address	LA neighborhood	School
Cathedral of Our Lady of the Angels		555 W. Temple St. 34°03′25″N 118°14′41″W	Downtown	K-8; 9-12
Holy Cross		4705 S. Main St. 34°00′03″N 118°16′27″W	South Los Angeles	No
Holy Name of Jesus		1955 W. Jefferson Blvd. 34°01′32″N 118°18′53″W	Jefferson Park	K-8
Immaculate Conception		1433 James M. Wood Blvd. 34°03′02″N 118°16′17″W	Westlake	K-8
Our Lady Queen of Angels ("La Placita")		535 N. Main St. 34°03′25″N 118°14′25″W	Downtown	No
Our Lady of the Bright Mount (Polish)		3424 W. Adams Blvd. 34°01′55″N 118°19′19″W	West Adams	No
Our Saviour (USC)		3207 University Ave. 34°01′26″N 118°17′07″W	Expo Park	No
St. Agatha		2646 S. Mansfield Ave. 34°01′51″N 118°21′09″W	Baldwin Hills	No
St. Agnes		2625 S. Vermont Ave. 34°01′55″N 118°17′30″W	West Adams	No
St. Anthony (Croatian)		712 N. Grand Ave. 34°03′46″N 118°14′35″W	Downtown	No
St. Bernadette		3825 Don Felipe Dr. 34°00′28″N 118°20′33″W	Baldwin Hills	No
St. Cecilia		4230 S. Normandie Ave. 34°00′20″N 118°17′59″W	South Los Angeles	K-8
St. Francis Xavier Chapel (Japanese)				
St. Joseph		1202 S. Los Angeles St. 34°02′12″N 118°15′30″W	Downtown	No
St. Patrick		1046 E. 34th St. 34°00′44″N 118°15′24″W	South Central	No
St. Paul		1920 S. Bronson Ave. 34°02′20″N 118°19′47″W	Mid-City	1-8
St. Stephen		3705 Woodlawn Ave. .34°00′52″N 118°16′23″W	South Central	No
St. Thomas the Apostle		1321 S. Mariposa Ave. 34°02′48″N 118°17′56″W	Pico-Union	K-8
St. Vincent de Paul		621 W. Adams Blvd. 34°01′43″N 118°16′34″W	West Adams	K-8
Transfiguration		2515 W. Martin Luther King Blvd. 34°00′39″N 118°19′16″W	Leimert Park	K-8

=== Deanery 16 (Los Angeles and unincorporated areas) ===
Church name	Image	Address	LA neighborhood	School
Ascension		517 W. 112th St. 33°55′59″N 118°16′59″W	Athens – unincorporated in Los Angeles County	K-8
Mother of Sorrows		114 W. 87th St. 33°57′30″N 118°16′28″W	South Los Angeles	K-8
Nativity		953 W. 57th St. 33°59′26″N 118°17′27″W	South Los Angeles	K-8
Presentation of Mary		6406 Parmelee Ave. 33°58′51″N 118°14′58″W	Florence – unincorporated in Los Angeles County	No
St. Anselm		2222 W. 70th St. 33°58′34″N 118°19′06″W	Hyde Park	No
St. Brigid		5214 S. Western Ave. 33°59′40″N 118°18′31″W	Crenshaw	No
St. Columbkille		6315 S. Main St. 33°58′54″N 118°16′27″W	South Los Angeles	K-8
St. Eugene		9505 Haas Ave. 33°57′00″N 118°19′00″W	Westmont – unincorporated in Los Angeles County	K-8
St. Frances X. Cabrini		1440 W. Imperial Hwy. 33°55′49″N 118°18′06″W	Athens – unincorporated in Los Angeles County	K-8
St. John Chrysostom		546 E. Florence Ave. 33°58′10″N 118°20′51″W	Inglewood	K-8
St. John the Evangelist		6028 Victoria Ave. 33°59′05″N 118°19′55″W	Hyde Park	K-8
St. Lawrence of Brindisi		10122 Compton Ave. 33°56′40″N 118°14′45″W	Watts	K-8
St. Malachy		1221 E. 82nd St. 33°57′53″N 118°15′11″W	Graham – unincorporated in Los Angeles County	K-8
St. Michael		1016 W. Manchester Ave. 33°57′34″N 118°17′34″W	Vermont Knolls	K-8
St. Odilia		5222 Hooper Ave. 33°59′43″N 118°15′06″W	South Los Angeles	K-8
St. Raphael		942 W. 70th St. 33°58′34″N 118°17′26″W	South Los Angeles	K-8

== Universities ==
School name	Image	Address	Community
Loyola Marymount University			Westchester
Mount Saint Mary's University, Los Angeles			Los Angeles

== High schools ==
School name	Image	Address	Community
Bishop Conaty-Our Lady of Loretto High School (Girls)		2900 W. Pico Blvd. 34°02′47″N 118°18′11″W	Harvard Heights
Cathedral High School (Boys)		1253 Bishops Rd. 34°04′12″N 118°14′04″W	Los Angeles
Immaculate Heart High School (Girls)		5515 Franklin Ave. 34°06′24″N 118°18′38″W	Los Feliz
Loyola High School (Boys)		1901 Venice Blvd. 34°02′41″N 118°17′47″W	Harvard Heights
Marymount High School (Girls)		10643 Sunset Blvd. 34°04′31″N 118°26′42″W	Bel Air
Notre Dame Academy (Girls)		2851 Overland Ave. 34°02′00″N 118°25′07″W	Los Angeles
St. Bernard High School		9100 Falmouth Ave. 33°57′15″N 118°25′57″W	Playa del Rey
St. Mary's Academy (Girls)		701 Grace Ave. 33°58′07″N 118°20′43″W	Inglewood
St. Monica Catholic High School		1030 Lincoln Blvd. 34°01′26″N 118°29′49″W	Santa Monica
Verbum Dei High School (Boys)		11100 S. Central Ave. 33°56′04″N 118°15′14″W	Watts

Daniel Murphy High School, located at 241 S. Detroit St., Los Angeles, closed in 2008.

== Non-affiliated elementary schools ==
The pastoral region include several elementary or middle schools that are not affiliated with the archdiocese.

- Cathedral Chapel, 755 S. Cochran Ave., Los Angeles
- Immaculate Heart Middle School, 5515 Franklin Ave., Los Angeles
- Notre Dame Academy Elementary School, 2911 Overland Ave., Los Angeles
- St. Turibius, 1524 Essex St., Los Angeles

== Hospitals ==
The archdiocese no longer operates any hospitals. The catholic hospitals in this pastoral region are operated by Providence Health & Services and Dignity Health, both non-profit organizations with hospitals in several states.

== Cemeteries ==
- Crypt Mausoleum of the Cathedral of Our Lady of the Angels, Los Angeles
- Holy Cross Cemetery, Culver City

== See also ==
- San Fernando Pastoral Region
- San Gabriel Pastoral Region
- San Pedro Pastoral Region
- Santa Barbara Pastoral Region

List of schools in the Roman Catholic Archdiocese of Los Angeles
