= St. Martin of Tours Catholic Church =

Coordinates: 34°03′32″N 118°28′28″W

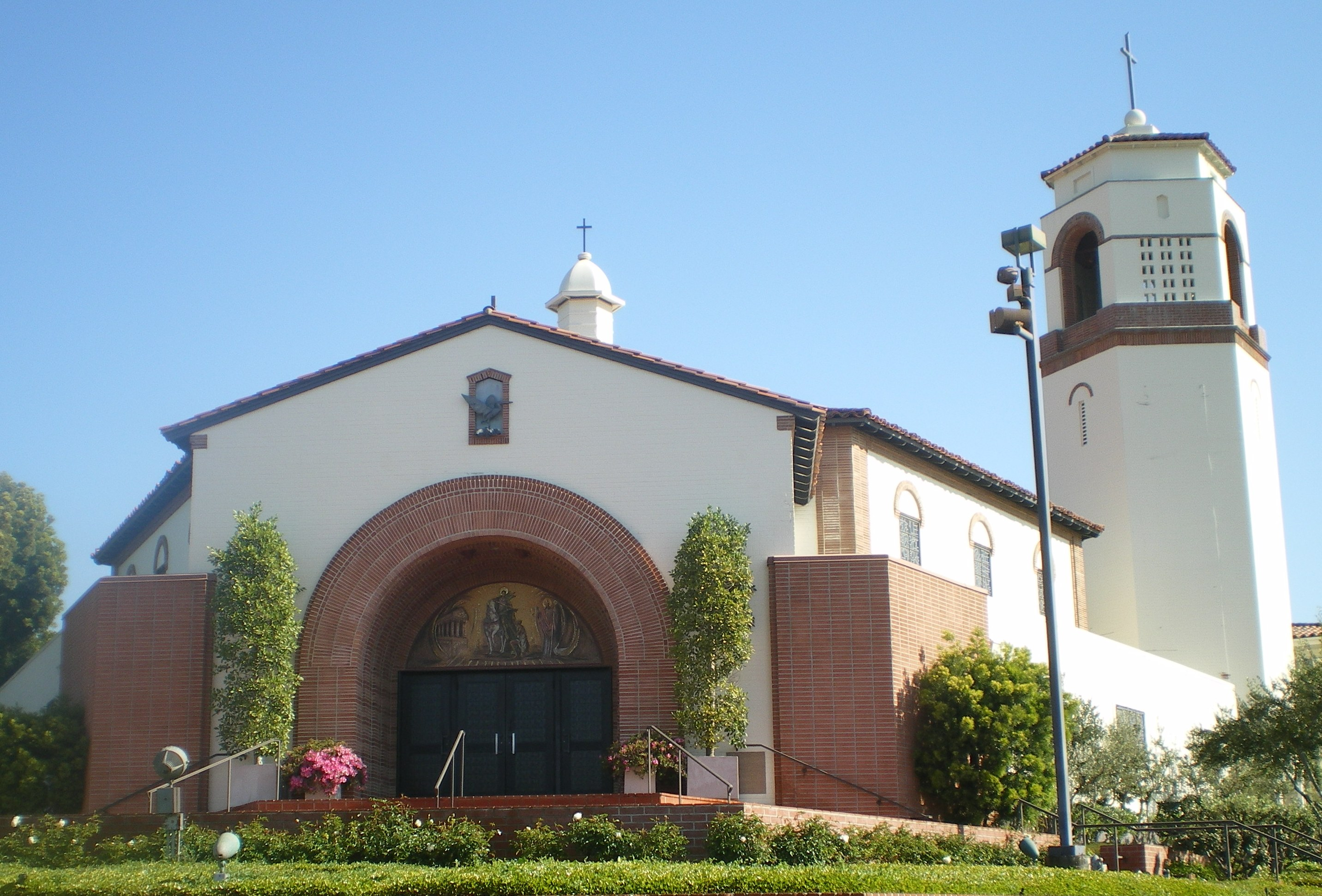
- St. Martin of Tours Catholic Church
- Location: 11967 Sunset Blvd., Brentwood, Los Angeles, California
- Country: United States
- Denomination: Roman Catholic
- Website: www.saintmartinoftours.com

History
- Status: Parish church
- Founded: Parish founded in 1946
- Dedicated: Church building dedicated November 1947

Architecture
- Functional status: Active
- Architectural type: Moorish
- Groundbreaking: February 9, 1947

Administration
- Division: Our Lady of the Angels Pastoral Region
- Archdiocese: Los Angeles

Clergy
- Archbishop: José Horacio Gómez
- Bishop: Matthew Elshoff
- Pastor: Fr. Paul K Fitzpatrick

St. Martin of Tours Catholic Church is a Catholic church in the Los Angeles Archdiocese, Our Lady of the Angels Pastoral Region. The church is located on Sunset Boulevard in the affluent Brentwood section of Los Angeles, California.

== History ==
The parish of St. Martin of Tours in Los Angeles was founded in 1946. The land acquired for the construction of the church was formerly an orchard on the estate of actor Gary Cooper. Ground was broken for the construction of the church on February 9, 1947, and the cost of the church was estimated at $150,000 with an additional $25,000 for furnishings. The church was dedicated in November 1947.

The parish has been served by two pastors for most of its existence. Father Augustine C. Murray was the first pastor, serving in that capacity for 28 years from 1946 to 1974. Lawrence Monsignor O'Leary later served as pastor for 24 years from 1979 to 2003.

In March 1949, the church was damaged in a fire set by an arsonist described by the Los Angeles Times as a "wild-eyed" and "crazed 25-year-old UCLA art student". After setting the church on fire in the early morning hours, the arsonist, dressed in a well-cut flannel suit, stood in the middle of the church parking lot screaming, "The church is afire. Let her burn. Let her burn." When the pastor and staff tried to extinguish the fire, the arsonist tried to block their passage, struck a staff member in the face, and threw a statue at the fire. The fire caused $5,000 in damages, and the following day, Father Murray said Mass in the church and urged forgiveness for the young man who had set the fire: "Let us pray for the poor boy who didn't know what he was doing. Let us pray that Almighty God may give him back his health."

In 1983, the parish built a parish center that is used for education, social functions, meetings and entertainment. The church was renovated in 1989.

Effective July 1, 2021, Fr. Paul Fitzpatrick was named pastor of St. Martin of Tours.

== Architecture ==
The church building is designed in the Moorish style.

== St. Martin of Tours School ==
In 1954, St. Martin of Tours School was opened. It was operated by the Sisters of St. Joseph of Carondolet until 1979.

In 1998, the school added a new wing, which included administration offices, a library, science lab and reading/math lab.

Today, St. Martin of Tours is Los Angeles' premier Preparatory Academy for students in grades K-8, and home to the only STEM Network Partner school within the Archdiocese of Los Angeles. The school provides a rigorous academic program for students and offers the following:

- Advanced Courses in STEAM, Language Arts, Spanish and Latin
- 1:1 Technology
- Performing Arts
- Fine Arts - Art and Music
- Service Learning
- Athletic Program
- Travel Experiences to Washington D.C., Houston Space Center, and Pali Institute Aftercare & Enrichment Programs.
- St. Martin of Tours Schools has a nationally ranked Academic Decathlon program for students in grades 6-8

== Association with celebrities ==
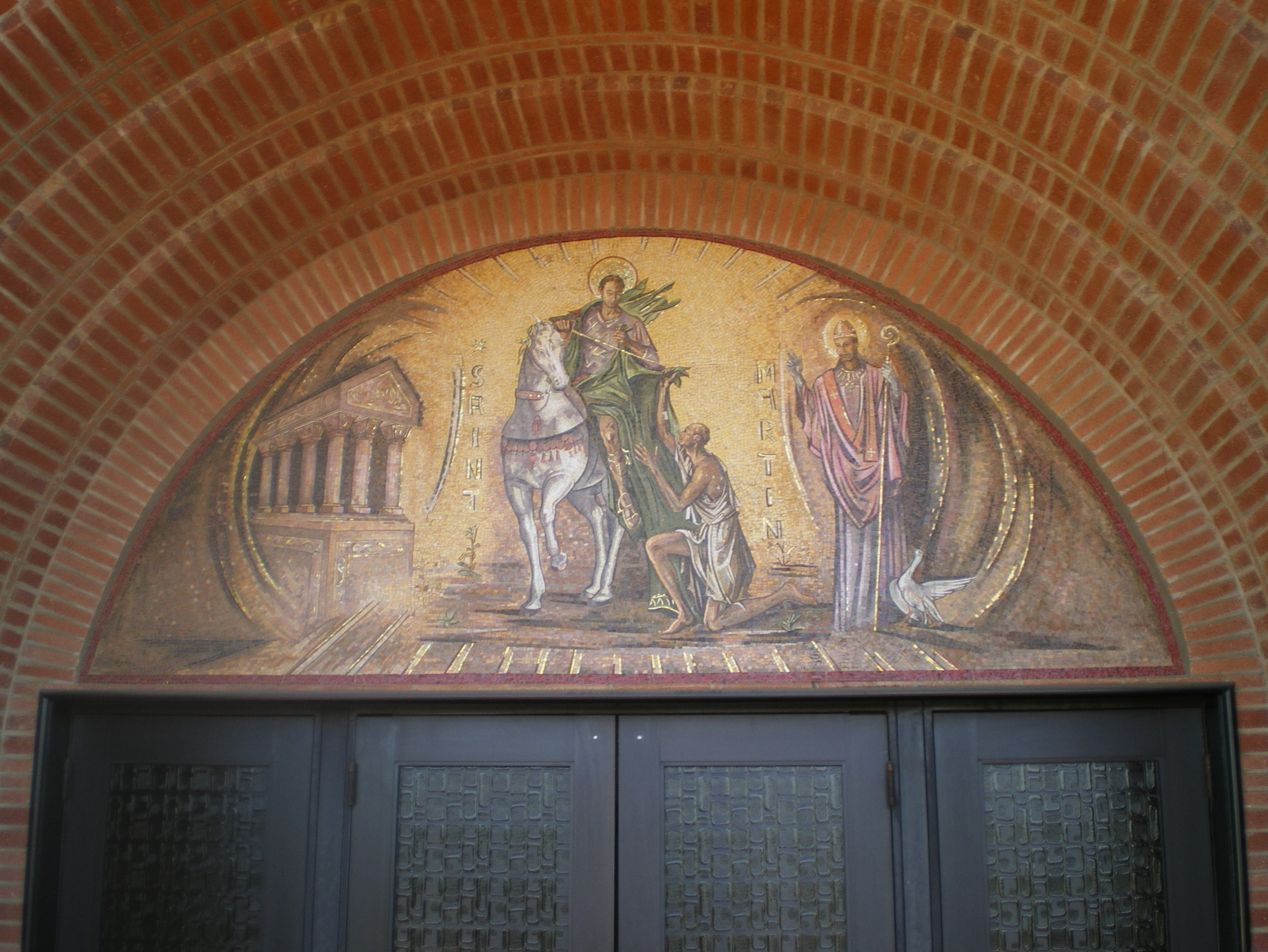
Front entrance to St. Martin of Tours

The parish is located in an affluent section of Los Angeles that is the home of numerous celebrities and prominent business persons.

Movie and stage actor Frank Fay was one of the founding members of the parish, and Mass was celebrated in the pool house of Fay's estate before the completion of the church building in 1947.

The church was built on a site adjacent to the estate of movie actor Gary Cooper. In 1979, the parish purchased Cooper's estate. The house was used as a convent, and the grounds were used as a playground for the students at St. Martin of Tours School and for church parking. The house was sold in 1980 after the Sisters of St. Joseph ceased operating the school.

In 1948, parishioners Frank Fay and Joe E. Brown began the tradition of an annual social event that was originally known as "Murray's Follies" and later became known as the "Leprechaun Ball." The Leprechaun Ball is an ongoing tradition at the parish. Celebrities and parishioners who have assisted with the event over the years include Richard Egan, Edmond O'Brien, Maureen O'Hara, Donald O'Connor, Steve McQueen, Barron Hilton, Dennis Day, the Lennon Sisters, the Lawrence Welk Orchestra, and Pat O'Brien.

Over the years, St. Martin has been the site of many celebrity weddings, baptisms and funerals, including the following:

- In 1951, the daughter of Tyrone Power and Linda Christian, Romina Francesca, was baptized at St. Martin of Tours.
- In April 1959, the funeral of Irish-American actor James Gleason was held at St. Martin of Tours. The requiem mass at St. Martin's was attended by, among others, John Wayne, Pat O'Brien, and Frank McHugh.
- In August 1959, actress Margaret O'Brien was married to art student Harold Robert Allen, Jr., at St. Martin of Tours. The bridesmaids included Anna Maria Alberghetti.
- In July 1960, the funeral for author and journalist Gene Fowler was held at St. Martin of Tours. Pallbearers at the funeral included former heavyweight boxing champion Jack Dempsey, Jimmy Durante, and Randolph Hearst, and chants were sung by the Roger Wagner Chorale.
- On April 20, 1963, fine artist Kristin Harmon married actor and singer Ricky Nelson
- In October 1983, the funeral for Pat O'Brien, "the prototypical charming Irishman in scores of films," was held at St. Martin of Tours.
- In May 1985, the funeral for Academy Award-winning actor Edmond O'Brien was held at the church.
- In July 1987, the funeral for Golden Globe-winning actor Richard Egan was held at the church.
- In March 1994, the funeral for actor and comedian John Candy was held at St. Martin of Tours. The funeral was attended by many actors and celebrities, including Tom Hanks, Chevy Chase, Bill Murray, Martin Short, and Rick Moranis. The eulogy was given by Dan Aykroyd.
- In June 1994, the funeral of murder victim Nicole Brown Simpson, ex-wife of O. J. Simpson was held at St. Martin of Tours. The funeral occurred amid "the buzz of media helicopters" and a "phalanx of reporters and camera people" flanking Saltair Avenue as suspected killer O. J. Simpson arrived at the funeral with the couple's children, Justin and Sydney. Nicole Simpson's light wood casket covered with a spray of white roses was taken to the church in a white hearse. Caitlyn Jenner (then Bruce), (Note: Jenner changed her name due to gender transition in 2015.) Steve Garvey and Al Cowlings were among those in attendance.
- In August 1998, the funeral for Pulitzer Prize-winning sportswriter Jim Murray was held at St. Martin of Tours. The funeral was attended by numerous sports, business and entertainment celebrities, including Mike Tyson and Peter Falk. Jack Whitaker delivered a eulogy in which he said, "Once again, he has out-written us all, because he is his own eulogy."
- In August 2002, St. Martin of Tours was the site of the funeral of Los Angeles Lakers announcer Chick Hearn. The funeral mass was given by Cardinal Roger M. Mahony and attended by sports legends and celebrities, including Jerry West, Kareem Abdul-Jabbar, Magic Johnson, Kobe Bryant, Los Angeles Mayor James Hahn, California Gov. Gray Davis, Vin Scully, John Wooden, and Jack Nicholson. In addition to 400 present at St. Martin, the funeral was simulcast to 19,000 fans at Staples Center and broadcast on Los Angeles television stations. In his eulogy, Cardinal Mahony told mourners: "I am going to go outside and look up in the sky, because I think for the last time we will see the meteor go by, and we will wave so long. This one's in the refrigerator."
- In 2006, the funeral mass for Jane Wyatt was held at St. Martin of Tours.
- In February 2026, the funeral for Golden Globe-winning actress Catherine O'Hara was held at the church.

== Mass schedule ==
Masses at St. Martin of Tours are in the English language. The regular weekend Mass schedule is Saturdays at 5:30 p.m., and Sundays at 7:30 a.m., 9:30 a.m., 11:30 a.m., and 5:30 p.m. Weekday Mass is offered Monday through Saturday at 8:15 a.m.
