= Precious Blood Catholic Church (Los Angeles) =

Coordinates: 34°03′54″N 118°17′02″W

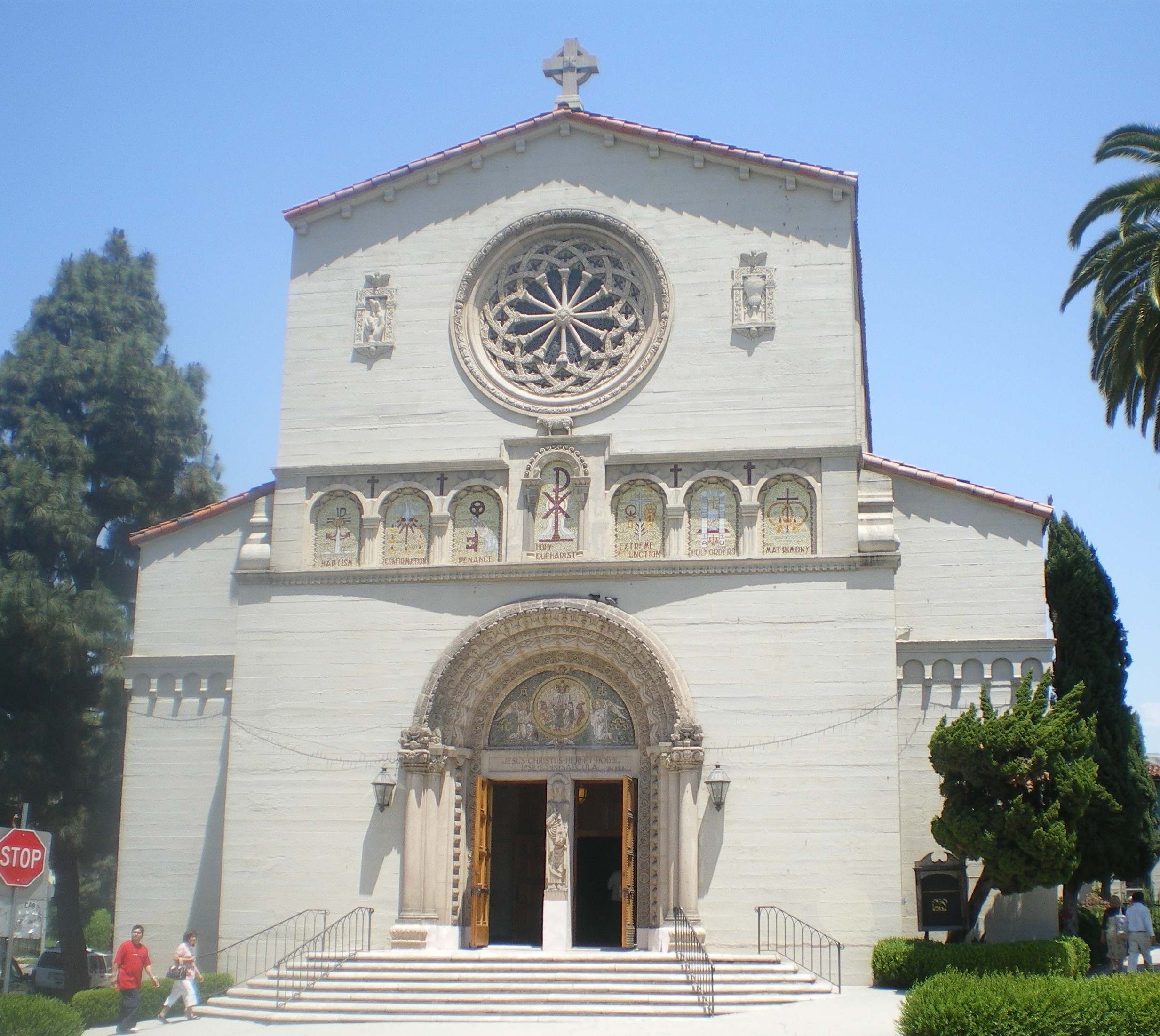
- Precious Blood Catholic Church
- Location: 435 S. Occidental Blvd., Los Angeles, California
- Country: USA
- Denomination: Roman Catholic
- Website: www.parishesonline.com

History
- Founded: Parish founded in 1923
- Dedicated: Church building dedicated November 1926

Architecture
- Architect(s): Truesdale & Newton
- Architectural type: Italian Romanesque

Administration
- Division: Our Lady of the Angels Pastoral Region
- Diocese: Archdiocese of Los Angeles

Clergy
- Archbishop: José Gómez
- Bishop: Matthew Elshoff
- Pastor(s): Fr. Crespo Lape, MJ

Precious Blood Catholic Church is a Roman Catholic church and parish in the Los Angeles Archdiocese, Our Lady of the Angels Pastoral Region. The church is located one block north of Lafayette Park at 435 South Occidental Boulevard in the Westlake section of Los Angeles, California. The current Italian Romanesque church structure was dedicated in 1926.

== History ==
The formation of the Precious Blood parish was announced in 1923 by Los Angeles Bishop John J. Cantwell. Since the zoning laws in the Occidental lot restricted building in a residential area at the time, a temporary church, built in the Gothic style at a cost of $10,000, was dedicated in May 1924 on Third Street between Coronado and Carondolet Avenues. Bishop John J. Cantwell presided at the dedication, and Father Michael O'Halloran became the first pastor.

After the city zoning laws changed the second and current church building on Occidental was dedicated in November 1926. This second church was built 3 years after the first. It may have left the parish or Archdiocese in serious debt. This debt was added to reinforce the swampy lot with piles of concrete to strengthen the weight of the foundation. To lighten the load of the church, it was built with poured concrete which was left hallow when dried. Father O'Halloran remained the pastor at Precious Blood for more than 40 years. The church became a meeting place for parish meetings.

In 1951 a new Parish Hall was built as a more appropriate place for parish functions. The hall features the main and small hall, kitchen, restrooms and an upstairs room. It was at Precious Blood Parish Hall where the St. Vincent Meals on Wheel began. A new school building could have also been built for future students to replace the old house. At the time the school only housed four grades and the group of nuns on the second floor. In the 1980s the parish was led by the highly popular Rev. Fr. John J. Fallon. His associate was Rev. Fr. Dennis Nobleza. He was most proud of the school's reputation to California state officials during their visit in 1987.

In 2004, the archdiocese turned over staffing and administration of the parish to the Missionaries of Jesus, a religious order based in the Philippines. As of 2024 it is paired with nearby St. Kevin Catholic Church, sharing clergy and administration.

The Rev. Manuel Gacad was installed by Bishop Edward Clark in 2010. According to 2002 census data, the 24-block area served by the church had 49,681 residents, 61% of whom were Hispanic, 26% Asian/Pacific, 6% White, and 5% Black.

In 2005, the small, grinning devil located on a stairwell to the church's organ loft was featured in a photographic exhibition depicting Los Angeles's historic religious sanctuaries at the Skirball Cultural Center.

== Architecture ==
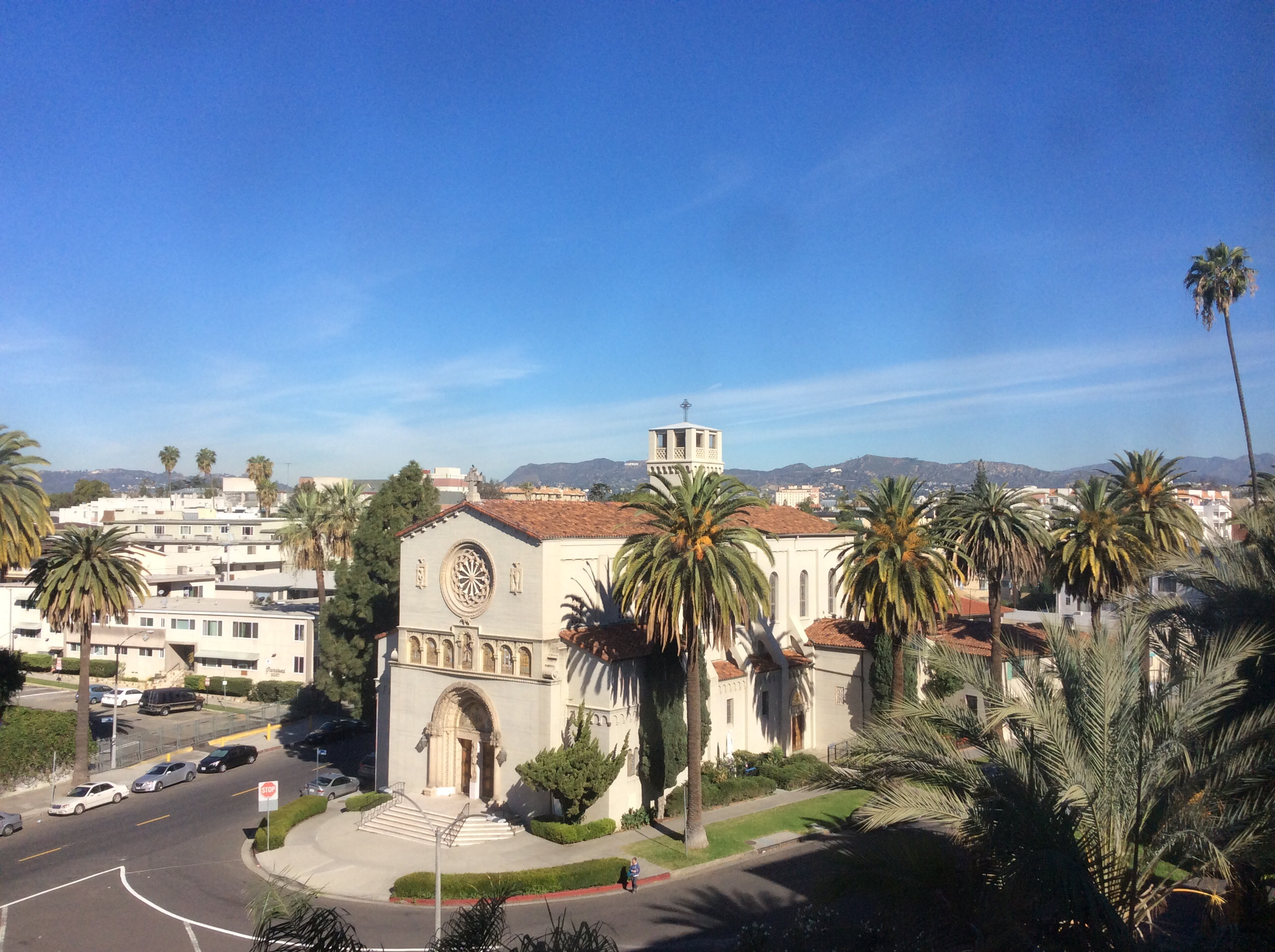
The view of the church from an aerial view.

The current church building stands on a v-shaped corner of Occidental Blvd. and Hoover St., dedicated in November 1926. It is an Italian Romanesque structure. The church has three rose windows that offer a dim and religious life. Twelve large stained glass windows, six yellow windows and the Stations of the Cross Mosaics are over the nave. The church structure is entirely made of poured concrete. The ceiling beams are painted to look like wood, but are actually concrete. The church was remodelled in 1951 by Wallace Neff who commissioned Millard Sheets to create the mosaics in the apse. Neff also added a parish hall.

Above the entrance is Sheet's Seven Sacrament Mosaic, was donated in the 1950s. The church is very intricately decorated, details of the mosaic contain 3-leaf clovers above the confessionals and rams along the side pillars of the nave. Decorative turtles on each side of the front exterior entrance near the cornerstone are featured.

On both sides of the church stands a Lourdes and Fatima Statue.

A second parking lot was added in late 1989 on Hoover St. after a house was demolished. This was accomplished by the dedicated parishioners of the time.

In September 2010, after over a ten-year absence, the organ in the choir loft has recently been repaired due to water damage and is now used in most Sunday masses.

The church structure has been used in many films and television either as a Catholic church or Non-denomination church.

== Precious Blood School ==
In September 1950, the Precious Blood School in an old house purchased by the parish at the corner of 3rd Street and Occidental Boulevard. The school opened initially for grades 1–4. Nuns from the Daughters of Mary and Joseph operated the school from 1950 to 1971. A nun remained principal of the school until 1984, but the school has been staffed by lay teachers since 1971.

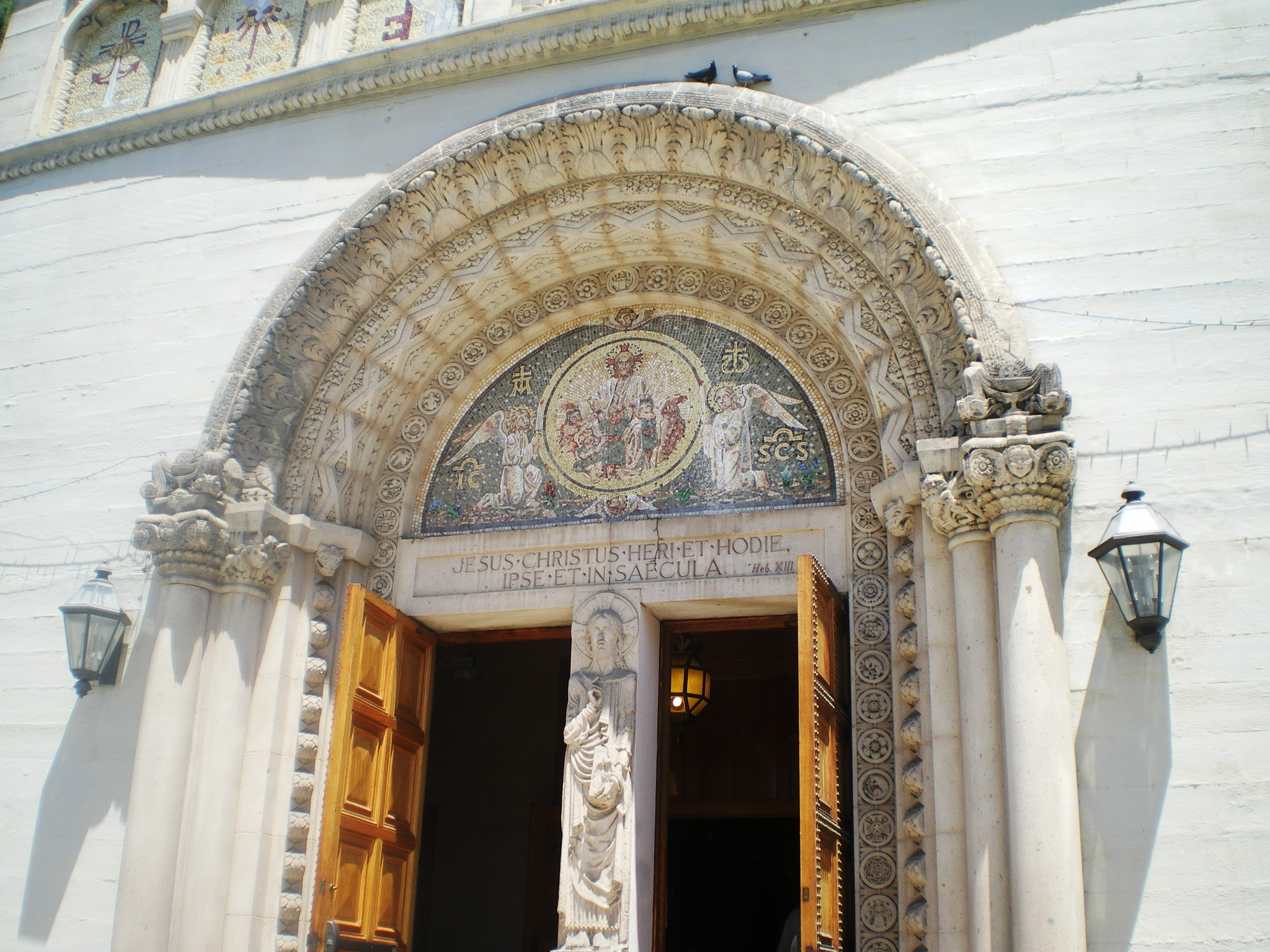
Entrance to Precious Blood Church

The school eventually expanded to serve students through the sixth grade. In 1996, the school expanded to include 7th and 8th grade.

In the late 1950s and 1960s, the demographics of the parish changed from predominantly Italian and Irish to predominantly Hispanic. In the 1970s, the school population was almost entirely Hispanic. In the 1980s, large numbers of Filipino families moved into the area, and a majority of the student population was Filipino.

In 2008, the Los Angeles Times published a feature story on Precious Blood School. The Times wrote:

"Both the neighborhood and the demographics of the student body have evolved, yet the sight of the old school looming in the background as uniformed children cavort on the asphalt playground might make a passing motorist think he'd been transported to a Catholic school in circa-1950s Chicago or Pittsburgh."

As of 2008, the school had 215 students, 60% of whom were Filipino and 30% Latino.

The school's alumni recognize one individual each year with the Sister Patricia Award for service to the school. The award is named after Sister Patricia Smith, who served as the principal at Precious Blood School from 1971 to 1984.

The current school building is seen as the "home school" where the founding parishioners converted a large house into a school. According to an L.A. Times article the school rooms are close together and cannot go over the enrolment limit. There are no plans to fund of building a new campus just like the neighborhood public schools.

The school's notable alumni include singer-songwriter Harry Nilsson (Class of 1955) and film actress Christine Avila (Class of 1961).

== Mass schedule ==
As of 2022, the regular mass schedule at Precious Blood include English and Spanish language masses. Daily masses are held from Monday through Saturday in English at 8 a.m. On Saturday, besides the 8:00 a.m mass, there is the 5:00 p.m. mass, both in English. Sunday masses start at 6:30 a.m. and 10:30 a.m. in Spanish and 8:30 a.m. and 12:30 p.m. in English.

== See also ==
- Our Lady of the Angels Pastoral Region
