= Beverly Hills Housewife =

1967 painting by David Hockney

- Artist: David Hockney
- Year: 1966-1967
- Medium: Acrylic on canvas
- Dimensions: 183 cm × 366 cm (72 in × 144 in)
- Location: Private collection

Beverly Hills Housewife is a large-scale acrylic painting by David Hockney, from 1966-1967. It is part of his California Dreaming series. It is held in a private collection.

The painting depicts the American philanthropist Betty Freeman standing on the patio of her luxury home in Los Angeles, California. The composition presents Freeman in a pink dress, positioned slightly off-center, surrounded by interior details such as an antelope head, a zebra-print Corbusier lounger, and orange carpeting. The painting also demonstrates Hockney’s engagement with Cubism and his tendency to distort perspective and flatten space.

The painting, a diptych, was purchased by Freeman upon its completion and formed the centrepiece of her art collection. When Freeman died in 2009, the painting was displayed at Christie's, King Street, London, before being auctioned in May 2009 in New York City. It sold for $7.9m.
