= Saint Monica Preparatory =

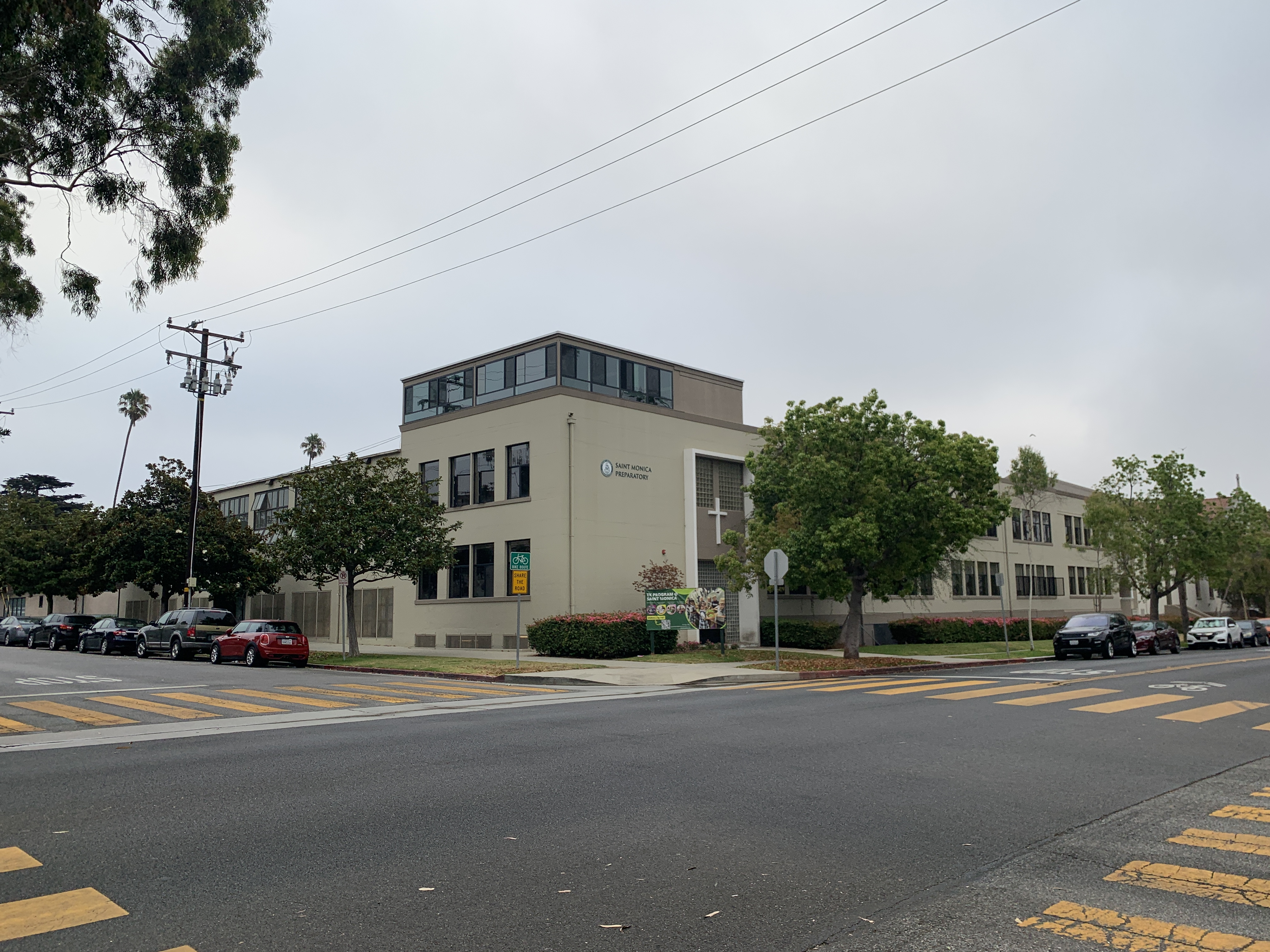
- Upper School campus

Location
- 1039 7th Street (Lower School); 1030 Lincoln Boulevard (Upper School); Santa Monica, California 90403; United States; 34°1′27″N 118°29′50″W

Information
- Type: Private
- Religious affiliation: Catholic
- Patron saint: Saint Monica
- Established: 1899; 127 years ago
- Founder: Sisters of the Holy Names of Jesus and Mary
- Authority: Archdiocese of Los Angeles
- President: Erin Luby
- Upper School Principal: James Spellman
- Lower School Principal: Neil Quinly
- Teaching staff: 41 (FTE)
- Grades: TK-12
- Gender: Coeducational
- Enrollment: 581
- Student to teacher ratio: 14.1
- Colors: Green and Gold
- Athletics conference: CIF Southern Section; Santa Fe League
- Sports: Football; basketball; tennis; soccer; volleyball; track and field; cross country; swimming; equestrian
- Mascot: Joe Mariner
- Nickname: Mariners
- Accreditation: Western Association of Schools and Colleges; Western Catholic Educational Association
- Newspaper: Weekly Compass
- Yearbook: Compass
- School fees: $550
- Tuition: $13,904 (2020–21)
- Affiliation: National Catholic Education Association; California Scholarship Federation
- Website: saintmonicaprep.org

Saint Monica Preparatory is a parochial, co-educational Catholic school in Santa Monica, California, consisting of students in grades Transitional kindergarten to grade 12. It is located in the Archdiocese of Los Angeles and serves the parish of St. Monica Catholic Church.

The school in its current organizational structure was formed by the merging of the parish elementary and high schools into a single TK–12 school, but the elementary and high schools remain on their respective separate campuses.

== Background ==
Saint Monica was established in 1899 by the Sisters of the Holy Names of Jesus and Mary. The academy housed both an elementary school and a high school until 1930, when the elementary school became the "Saint Monica Parish Elementary School" and was transferred to its present site on Seventh Street. The school was sold in 1935, and Saint Monica High School was opened in 1939. The women's high school and the men's high schools were operated separately until the fall of 1968, when classroom instruction became co-educational.

Former logo of Saint Monica Catholic High School

The elementary and high schools had long been affiliated with one another as parish schools serving the St. Monica Catholic Church but were administered separately. In the spring of 2022, the school board announced that the two schools would merge into one legal entity under a single administration beginning in the 2022–23 academic year. The TK-12 school would be rebranded as Saint Monica Preparatory.

== Notable alumni ==
- Donna Corcoran, actress
- Bison Dele, formerly Brian Williams, basketball player
- Steven M. Hilton, businessman and philanthropist. His mother Marilyn is also an alumnus
- Adrian Klemm, football player
- Bob Klein, football player for USC, LA Rams and San Diego Chargers
- Michael Klesic, actor
- Daniel "Danny" Moder, cameraman, husband of Julia Roberts
- Jason Patric, actor
- Terry Schofield, basketball player on three NCAA Championship teams at UCLA under legendary coach John Wooden. German Professional Basketball League player and coach
- Leon Wood, NBA Basketball player and referee
- The Lennon Sisters, singing family
- Randy Pedersen (1980), professional bowler, color analyst for ESPN coverage of PBA Tour
- Robert Wagner, actor
- Marcellus Wiley, National Football League Pro Bowl defensive lineman, Columbia University Hall of Fame, former ESPN TV and Radio Host, now co-host on Speak for Yourself
- C.J. Wallace, actor, musician, son of The Notorious B.I.G. and Faith Evans
