= St. Monica Catholic Church (Santa Monica, California) =

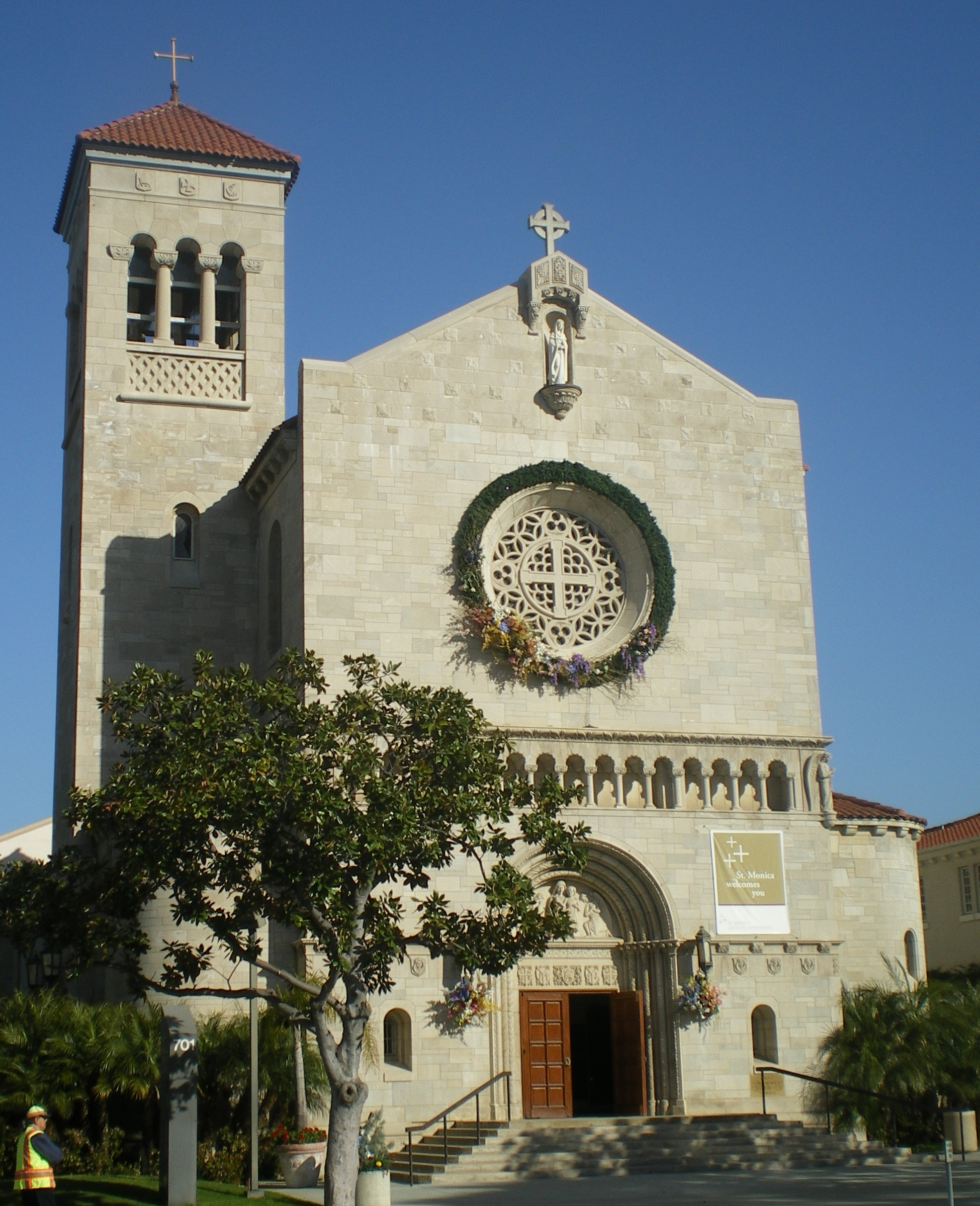
- St. Monica Catholic Church
- 34°1′23″N 118°29′50″W
- Location: 725 California Avenue, Santa Monica, California
- Country: United States
- Denomination: Roman Catholic
- Website: stmonica.net

History
- Founded: Parish founded in 1886; 140 years ago
- Dedicated: Church building dedicated July 1926; 100 years ago

Administration
- Division: Our Lady of the Angels Pastoral Region
- Diocese: Archdiocese of Los Angeles

Clergy
- Archbishop: José Horacio Gómez
- Bishop: Matthew Elshoff
- Pastor: Msgr. Lloyd Torgerson (1987-present)

St. Monica Catholic Church is a Catholic parish in Santa Monica, California. It is one of the largest churches in the Archdiocese of Los Angeles.

Located at 7th and California Streets, it was designed by Albert C. Martin Sr., erected in 1925 and served as the inspiration for the 1944 film classic Going My Way with Bing Crosby. The Duval Center, one of several buildings on the St. Monica campus, was designed by Frank Gehry and built in 1998. There are two schools associated with St. Monica Catholic Church: St. Monica Catholic Elementary School for grades TK-8 and St. Monica Catholic High School for grades 9-12, both of which are located on the same site as the church.

== History ==
The parish was established in 1886. Prior to the formation of St. Monica, the nearest Catholic church was at Olvera Street in Downtown Los Angeles. The current church opened for Christmas in 1925. At the time, the Los Angeles Times reported: "The opening of St. Monica's Church, ranked in the cathedral class and probably the finest Catholic Church of its kind on the Pacific Coast, will be celebrated with solemn high mass at 5 o'clock Christmas morning. For the first time the interior splendors of this remarkably beautiful and dignified religious edifice will be revealed to St. Monica' parish, and many out-of-town visitors are expected." The church was not officially dedicated until July 1926, at which time the Los Angeles Times reported: "A crowd numbering many thousands surrounded the handsome limestone structure on California avenue and Seventh street, the overflow standing under the towering eucalipti of the city park opposite the church. ... Strains from the great pipe organ of St. Monica's floated to the overflow crowd outside to give at least a hint of the sacred services within."

In 1994, the church was damaged in the Northridge earthquake. The city of Santa Monica wanted to condemn the church and begin demolition, but Nabih Youssef was brought on site and declared that it could be repaired. Mass was held in the gymnasium until repairs could be made.

Frank Gehry, a Santa Monica resident, designed an adjoining hospitality center, the Duval Center, which was built in 1998. In 2002, the New York Times wrote that the Gehry-designed building "contributes to the outreach efforts that, along with good liturgies and preaching, are parish hallmarks."

In 2007, St. Monica embarked on an aggressive $27 million capital campaign to meet the needs of the growing community and aging buildings. The Pastoral Center was demolished in late 2011 to make room for a new Community Center and Reception Pavilion. Groundbreaking took place in January 2012. Construction was completed in August 2013, with the grand opening celebration on November 3, 2013.

Since 2002, St. Monica Catholic Community has enjoyed a sister relationship with the Holy Cross Parish in Dandora, Kenya.

== Monsignor Conneally and Going My Way ==
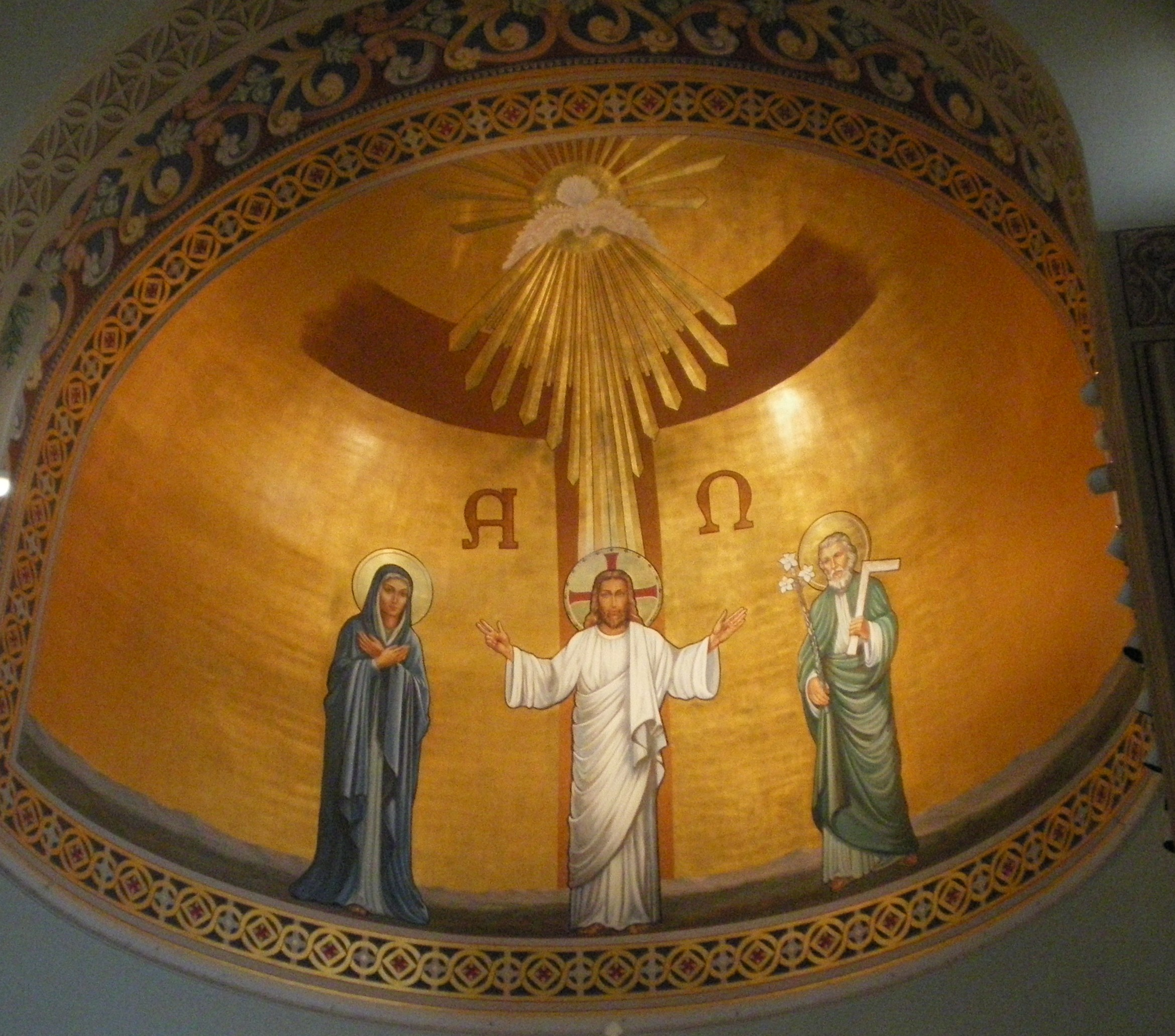
Interior of dome at St. Monica's

Academy Award Best Picture winner Going My Way, the 1944 film in which Father O'Malley (played by Bing Crosby) saved his struggling St. Dominic's in New York, was partly inspired by Msgr. Nicholas Conneally, former pastor of St. Monica. The role of the irascible old Irish priest, Father Fitzgibbon (for which Barry Fitzgerald won the Best Supporting Actor Oscar), was based on Msgr. Conneally. Msgr. Conneally was the pastor of St. Monica for 26 years from 1923 to 1949, when he died at St. John's Hospital after a brief illness. The film's director and writer Leo McCarey was a parishioner and friend of Msgr. Conneally. McCarey recalled that Msgr. Conneally had approached him seeking funds for a new loudspeaker. McCarey made the donation and asked the older priest how he got along with his young priests. "They're nice fellows," the priest replied, "who are figuring on how they can change things around when I die." McCarey recalled, "I didn't know it then, but I was meeting the Barry Fitzgerald character in Going My Way."

When Msgr. Conneally died in 1949, a newspaper wrote: "Mr. McCarey said that the monsignor was a frequent visitor at his home. The priest's many anecdotes about his work in the parish and St. Monica's School gave the director the idea it would make a good film story. It did." Going My Way won seven Academy Awards including best picture, director, original story, original screenplay, song ("Swinging on a Star"), actor (Bing Crosby) and supporting actor (Fitzgerald in the role of the older priest).

== Celebrity connections ==
In 2004, death penalty opponents, including Mike Farrell and Jesse Jackson, protested at St. Monica's to draw attention to the refusal of Governor Arnold Schwarzenegger (a St. Monica's parishioner) to grant clemency to a prisoner scheduled for execution. In addition to Schwarzenegger, other well-known parishioners at St. Monica include Martin Sheen, Brooke Shields, Kelsey Grammer, June Lockhart, former Los Angeles Mayor Richard Riordan, as well as Chris Farley and Lawrence Welk.

The church was the site of funerals for Lucille Ball in May 1989, and Chris Farley in January 1998. In March 1998, Lucy Lawless of Xena, Warrior Princess married producer Robert Tapert at St. Monica's. Tom Brady and Gisele Bündchen were married at the church in 2009.

== See also ==
- Our Lady of the Angels Pastoral Region
