= Edward William Clark =

American Catholic bishop (b. 1946)

His Excellency, The Most Reverend Edward William Clark
- Auxiliary Bishop Emeritus of Los Angeles
- Archdiocese: Los Angeles
- Appointed: January 16, 2001
- Installed: March 26, 2001
- Retired: February 15, 2022

Orders
- Ordination: May 9, 1972 by Timothy Manning
- Consecration: March 25, 2001 by Roger Mahony, William Levada, and Justin Francis Rigali

Personal details
- Born: November 30, 1946 (age 79) Minneapolis, Minnesota, US
- Education: Pontifical Gregorian University
- Motto: The gift received, give as a gift

Styles of Edward William Clark
- Reference style: His Excellency; The Most Reverend
- Spoken style: Your Excellency
- Religious style: Bishop

Edward William Clark (born November 30, 1946) is an American prelate of the Catholic Church. He served as an auxiliary bishop of the Archdiocese of Los Angeles in California from 2001 to 2022.

== Biography ==
=== Early life ===
Edward Clark was born on November 30, 1946, in Minneapolis, Minnesota. Educated in California, he attended the former Our Lady Queen of Angels Seminary in Mission Hills, Los Angeles, and St. John's Seminary in Camarillo, California.

=== Priesthood ===
Clark was ordained to the priesthood for the Archdiocese of Los Angeles by Archbishop Timothy Manning on May 9, 1972. After his ordination, Clark was posted as an associate pastor to Saint James Parish in Redondo Beach, California, and Saint Joseph Parish in Pomona, California. He attended Mount St. Mary’s College in Los Angeles, earning a Master of Education degree in 1973. Clark then served as principal at Paraclete High School in Lancaster, California.

From 1985 to 1988, Clark studied at the Pontifical Gregorian University in Rome, where he earned a Licentiate in Fundamental Theology and a Doctor of Theology degree. Returning to Southern California, Clark served as coordinator of religious instruction for secondary schools from 1988 to 1990, and was named president of St. John's Seminary College in 1994.

Clark in 1999 published the book Five Great Catholic Ideas. He has also written many magazine and newspaper articles.

=== Auxiliary Bishop of Los Angeles ===
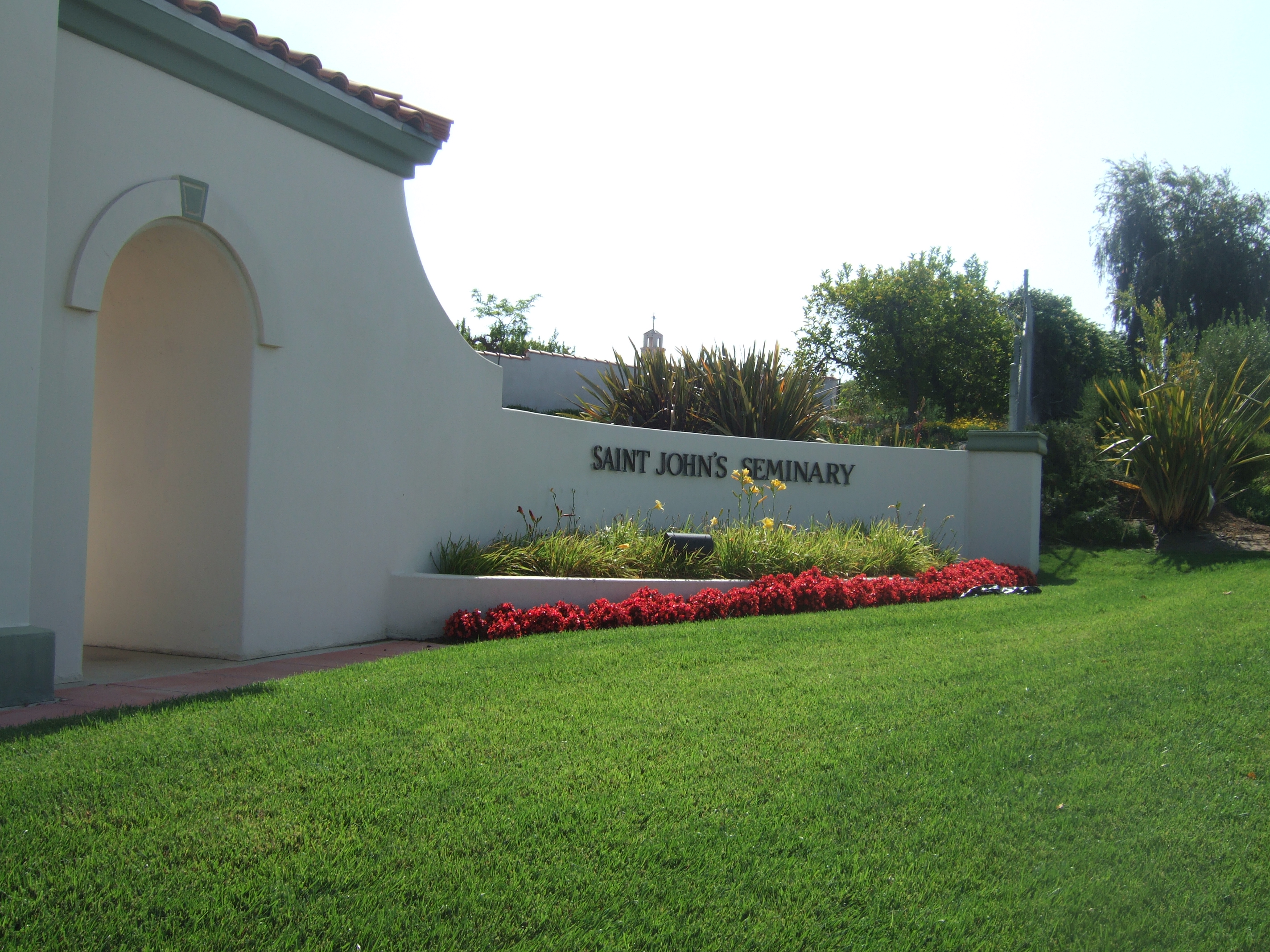
Saint John's Seminary, Camarillo, California (2010)

On January 16, 2001, Clark was appointed auxiliary bishop of Los Angeles and titular bishop of Garðar by Pope John Paul II. He received his episcopal consecration on March 25, 2001, from Cardinal Roger Mahony, with Archbishops William Levada and Justin Rigali serving as co-consecrators. As an auxiliary bishop, Clark served as the regional bishop for the Our Lady of the Angels Pastoral Region.

Within the United States Conference of Catholic Bishops (USCCB), Clark served as co-chair of the Anglican–Roman Catholic Theological Consultation and as a member of the Committee on Doctrine, the Committee on African American Catholics, and the Committee on Interfaith Activities.

Within the California Conference of Catholic Bishops, Clark served as chair of the Committee on Education, chair of the task force on Native American Historic Concerns, co-chair of the Serra Committee, and member of the Strategic Concerns Committee. Clark was also president of the Western Catholic Education Association, responsible for the accreditation of Catholic schools in seven western states.

=== Retirement ===
Pope Francis accepted Clark's letter of resignation as auxiliary bishop of Los Angeles on February 15, 2022.
