= John Teupel =

American politician

Member of the South Dakota House of Representatives from the 31st district
- In office January 9, 2001 – January 11, 2005
- Preceded by: Jerry Apa; Mark Young
- Succeeded by: Charles Turbiville; Tom Hills

Personal details
- Born: May 30, 1962 (age 64) Deadwood, South Dakota
- Party: Republican

John Teupel (born May 30, 1962) is an American politician who served in the South Dakota House of Representatives from the 31st district from 2001 to 2005.
