= Fred Romkema =

American politician

Member of the South Dakota House of Representatives from the 31st district
- Incumbent
- Assumed office January 2009 Serving with Charles Turbiville (2009–2013); Timothy Johns (2013–present)
- Preceded by: Tom Hills

Personal details
- Born: July 3, 1947 (age 79) Artesia, California
- Party: Republican
- Education: University of South Dakota
- Website: romkemaforhouse.com

Fred W. Romkema (born July 3, 1947) is an American politician and a Republican member of the South Dakota House of Representatives representing District 31 since January 2009.

== Education ==
Romkema earned his BA and MA degrees from the University of South Dakota.

== Elections ==
- 2012 With Republican Representative Charles Turbiville term limited and leaving a District 31 seat open, Romkema ran in the four-way June 5, 2012 Republican Primary and placed first with 1,467 votes (31.4%); Romkema and fellow Republican nominee Timothy Johns were unopposed for the November 6, 2012 General election, where Romkema took the first seat with 6,721 votes (52%) and Johns took the second seat.
- 2008 When District 30 incumbent Republican Representative Tom Hills ran for South Dakota Senate and left a District 31 seat open, Romkema ran in the three-way June 3, 2008 Republican Primary and placed first with 1,898 votes (40.7%); in the three-way November 4, 2008 General election Romkema took the first seat with 6,783 votes (38.1%) and incumbent Republican Representative Charles Turbiville took the second seat ahead of Democratic nominee Kevin O'Dea.
- 2010 Romkema, incumbent Representative Turbiville, and returning 2008 Democratic opponent O'Dea were unopposed for their primaries, setting up a three-way rematch; in the three-way November 2, 2010 General election Romkema took the first seat with 6,335 votes (40%) and Representative Turbiville took the second seat ahead of Democratic nominee Kevin O'Dea.
