= Timothy Johns =

American politician (born 1948)

Member of the South Dakota Senate from the 31st district
- Incumbent
- Assumed office 2021

Member of the South Dakota House of Representatives from the 31st district
- In office January 11, 2013 – January 12, 2021
- Preceded by: Charles Turbiville
- Succeeded by: Scott Odenbach; Mary Fitzgerald

Personal details
- Born: July 17, 1948 (age 78)
- Party: Republican
- Education: Northern State University; University of South Dakota

Timothy Robert Johns (born July 17, 1948) is an American politician and a Republican member of the South Dakota Senate. He previously served as a member of the South Dakota House of Representatives representing District 31 from January 11, 2013 to January 12, 2021.

== Education ==
Johns earned his Bachelor of Arts degrees in political science and sociology from Northern State University and his JD from the University of South Dakota School of Law.

== Election history ==
- 2020 Johns was elected with 9,911 votes to the South Dakota Senate, running unopposed in the general election. Johns defeated John Teupel in the Republican primary; Johns received 2,020 votes and Teupel received 1,423 votes.
- 2018 Johns was re-elected with 6,879 votes; Charles Turbiville was elected with 5,040 votes and Naveen Malik received 3,789 votes and Wyatt Osthus received 2,539 votes.
- 2016 Johns was re-elected with 7,359; Charles Turbiville was elected with 6,136 votes.
- 2014 Johns was re-elected with 4,912 votes; Fred Romkema was also re-elected with 5,550 votes.
- 2012 When Republican Representative Charles Turbiville was term limited and left a District 31 seat open, Johns ran in the four-way June 5, 2012 Republican Primary and placed second with 1,169 votes (25.1%); Johns and incumbent Republican Representative Fred Romkema were unopposed for the November 6, 2012 General election, where Representative Romkema took the first seat and Johns took the second seat with 6,213 votes (48.04%).
