= San Pedro Pastoral Region =

The San Pedro Pastoral Region is a pastoral region of the Archdiocese of Los Angeles in the Roman Catholic Church. It covers the City of Long Beach and southern Los Angeles County in California, with its headquarters in Lakewood. In 1986, Los Angeles Archbishop Roger Mahony divided the archdiocese into five pastoral regions to make church leaders more accessible to parishioners. This pastoral region is divided into four deaneries.

As of 2024, the regional auxiliary bishop is Marc V. Trudeau. The region has 67 parishes, eight high schools and 53 elementary schools. The two Catholic hospitals in this region, Providence Little Company of Mary Medical Center, Torrance, and Little Company of Mary Hospital, San Pedro, are not operated by the archdiocese. The region has no Spanish missions or Catholic universities.

== Parishes ==
=== Deanery 17 (Los Angeles, Downey, Compton and other communities) ===
Church name	Image	Address	Community or LA neighborhood
Holy Angels Church of the Deaf		4433 S. Santa Fe Ave. 34°00′10″N 118°13′50″W	Vernon
Our Lady of Perpetual Help		10727 S. Downey Ave. 33°56′39″N 118°07′50″W	Downey
Our Lady of the Rosary		14815 S. Paramount Blvd. 33°53′55″N 118°09′37″W	Paramount
Our Lady of Victory		519 E. Palmer St. 33°53′54″N 118°13′03″W	Compton
Sagrado Corazon		1720 N. Culver Ave. 33°54′28″N 118°13′41″W	Compton
Sagrado Corazon y Santa Maria Guadalupe		4239 Clara St. 33°58′00″N 118°11′35″W	Cudahy
San Miguel		2214 E. 108th St. 33°56′14″N 118°13′56″W	Los Angeles – Watts
St. Albert the Great		804 E. Compton Blvd. 33°53′45″N 118°12′52″W	Rancho Dominguez
St. Aloysius Gonzaga		7814 Crockett Blvd. 33°58′05″N 118°14′11″W	Florence (Unincorporated Los Angeles)
St. Bernard		9647 E. Beach St. 33°52′37″N 118°08′39″W	Bellflower
St. Dominic Savio		13400 Bellflower Blvd. 33°52′08″N 118°07′30″W	Bellflower
St. Emydius		10900 California Ave. 33°56′01″N 118°12′29″W	Lynwood
St. Gertrude the Great		7025 Garfield Ave. 33°58′03″N 118°09′03″W	Bell Gardens
St. Helen		8912 South Gate Ave. 33°57′16″N 118°12′51″W	South Gate
St. Martha		6019 Stafford Ave. 33°59′11″N 118°13′17″W	Huntington Park
St. Matthias		7125 Mission Pl. 33°58′24″N 118°12′45″W	Huntington Park
St. Philip Neri		4311 Olanda St. 33°54′30″N 118°11′39″W	Lynwood
St. Raymond		12348 Paramount Blvd. 33°55′37″N 118°08′55″W	Downey
St. Rose of Lima		4450 E. 60th St. 33°59′07″N 118°11′11″W	Maywood

=== Deanery 18 (Whittier, La Mirada, Pico Rivera and other communities) ===
Church name	Image	Address	Community
Beatitudes of Our Lord		13013 S. Santa Gertrudes Ave. 33°54′45″N 117°59′42″W	La Mirada
Holy Family		18708 S. Clarkdale Ave. 33°51′40″N 118°04′45″W	Artesia
Our Lady of Perpetual Help		8545 S. Norwalk Blvd. 33°57′49″N 118°04′16″W	Los Nietos
St. Bruno		15740 Citrustree Rd. 33°56′14″N 117°59′38″W	Whittier
St. Francis Xavier		4245 S. Acacia Ave. 34°00′44″N 118°04′56″W	Pico Rivera
St. Gregory the Great		13935 Telegraph Rd. 33°55′59″N 118°02′02″W	South Whittier
St. Hilary		5465 S. Citronell Ave. 33°59′37″N 118°05′04″W	Pico Rivera
St. John of God		13819 S. Pioneer Blvd. 33°54′21″N 118°05′01″W	Norwalk
St. Linus		13915 Shoemaker Ave. 33°54′17″N 118°03′19″W	Norwalk
St. Mariana de Paredes		7922 S. Passons Blvd. 33°57′58″N 118°05′44″W	Pico Rivera
St. Mary of the Assumption		7215 Newlin Ave. 33°58′36″N 118°02′28″W	Whittier
St. Paul of the Cross		14020 Foster Rd. 33°54′34″N 118°01′37″W	La Mirada
St. Peter Chanel		12001 E. 214 St. 33°50′08″N 118°04′32″W	Hawaiian Gardens
St. Pius X		10827 S. Pioneer Blvd. 33°56′04″N 118°04′55″W	Santa Fe Springs

=== Deanery 19 (The 17-city South Bay area such as Torrance and San Pedro) ===
Church name	Image	Address	Community or LA neighborhood
American Martyrs		624 15th St. 33°53′20″N 118°24′24″W	Manhattan Beach
Holy Family		1011 E. L St. 33°47′14″N 118°15′00″W	Los Angeles – Wilmington
Holy Trinity		209 N. Hanford St. 33°44′40″N 118°18′08″W	Los Angeles – San Pedro
Maria Regina		2150 W. 135th St. 33°54′32″N 118°19′00″W	Gardena
Mary Star of the Sea		870 W. 8th St. 33°44′13″N 118°17′45″W	Los Angeles – San Pedro
Nativity		1447 Engracia Ave. 33°50′01″N 118°19′19″W	Torrance
Our Lady of Guadalupe		320 Massey St. 33°51′32″N 118°23′08″W	Hermosa Beach
St. Andrew (Russian-Greek Church)		538 Concord St. 33°55′24″N 118°25′04″W	El Segundo
St. Anthony		710 E. Grand Ave. 33°55′09″N 118°24′29″W	El Segundo
St. Anthony of Padua		1050 W. 163rd St. 33°52′59″N 118°17′35″W	Gardena
St. Catherine Laboure		3846 W. Redondo Beach Blvd. 33°52′42″N 118°20′23″W	Torrance
St. Catherine of Alexandria		800 Beacon St.	Avalon
St. James		415 Vincent St. 33°50′37″N 118°23′13″W	Redondo Beach
St. John Fisher		5448 Crest Rd. 33°45′47″N 118°22′00″W	Rancho Palos Verdes
St. Joseph		11901 S. Acacia Ave. 33°55′30″N 118°21′05″W	Hawthorne
St. Lawrence Martyr		1900 Prospect Ave. 33°49′04″N 118°22′35″W	Redondo Beach
St. Margaret Mary Alacoque		25511 Eshelman Ave. 33°47′29″N 118°18′54″W	Lomita
St. Paul Melkite (Greek Mission)		538 Concord St. 33°55′24″N 118°25′04″W	El Segundo
St. Peter		338 N. Grand Ave. 33°44′44″N 118°17′23″W	Los Angeles – San Pedro
SS. Peter and Paul's		515 W. Opp St. 33°46′58″N 118°16′04″W	Los Angeles – Wilmington
St. Philomena		21900 S. Main St. 33°49′41″N 118°16′37″W	Carson

=== Deanery 20 (Long Beach and Lakewood) ===
Church name	Image	Address	Community
Holy Innocents		425 E. 20th St. 33°47′37″N 118°11′15″W	Long Beach
Our Lady of Refuge		5195 Stearns St. 33°47′46″N 118°07′59″W	Long Beach
St. Anthony		600 Olive Ave .33°46′27″N 118°10′55″W	Long Beach
St. Athanasius		5390 Linden Ave. 33°51′14″N 118°11′08″W	Long Beach – N. Long Beach
St. Barnabas		3955 Orange Ave. 33°49′50″N 118°10′35″W	Long Beach – Bixby Knolls
St. Bartholomew		252 Granada Ave. 33°45′52″N 118°08′01″W	Long Beach – Alamitos Heights
St. Cornelius		5500 E. Wardlow Rd. 33°49′06″N 118°07′26″W	Long Beach
St. Cyprian		4714 Clark Ave. 33°50′36″N 118°08′00″W	Long Beach
St. Joseph		6220 E. Willow St. 33°48′09″N 118°06′32″W	Long Beach – El Dorado Park
St. Lucy		2344 Cota Ave. 33°47′59″N 118°12′58″W	Long Beach
St. Maria Goretti		3954 Palo Verde Ave. 33°49′46″N 118°06′26″W	Long Beach
St. Matthew		672 Temple Ave. 33°46′30″N 118°09′30″W	Long Beach – Rose Park
St. Pancratius		3519 Saint Pancratius Pl. 33°51′32″N 118°09′00″W	Lakewood

== High schools ==
School name	Image	Address	Community
St. John Bosco High School		13640 Bellflower Blvd. 33°54′24″N 118°07′28″W	Bellflower
Queen of Angels Academy		823 E. Compton Blvd. 33°53′45″N 118°12′51″W	Compton
St. Pius X - St. Matthias Academy		7851 Gardendale St. 33°55′11″N 118°09′34″W	Downey
Junipero Serra High School		14830 S. Van Ness Ave. 33°53′48″N 118°19′03″W	Gardena
St. Joseph High School		5825 N. Woodruff Ave. 33°51′37″N 118°07′04″W	Lakewood
St. Anthony High School		620 Olive Ave .33°46′29″N 118°10′55″W	Long Beach
Don Bosco High School		1151 San Gabriel Blvd. 34°02′29″N 118°05′13″W	Rosemead
Mary Star of the Sea High School		2500 N. Taper Ave.	San Pedro
St. Paul High School		9635 Greenleaf Ave. 33°57′04″N 118°03′09″W	Santa Fe Springs
Bishop Montgomery High School		5430 Torrance Blvd. 33°50′12″N 118°22′21″W	Torrance

== Elementary schools ==
- Our Lady of Fatima, Artesia
- St. Gertrude, Bell Gardens
- St. Bernard, Bellflower
- St. Dominic Savio, Bellflower
- St. Philomena, Carson
- Our Lady of Victory, Compton
- Our Lady of Perpetual Help, Downey
- St. Raymond, Downey
- St. Anthony, El Segundo
- Maria Regina, Gardena
- St. Anthony of Padua, Gardena
- St. Joseph, Hawthorne
- Our Lady of Guadalupe, Hermosa Beach
- St. Matthias, Huntington Park
- Beatitudes of Our Lord, La Mirada
- St. Paul of the Cross, La Mirada
- St. Pancratius, Lakewood
- St. Margaret Mary Alacoque, Lomita
- Holy Innocents, Long Beach
- Our Lady of Refuge, Long Beach
- St. Anthony, Long Beach
- St. Athanasius, Long Beach
- St. Barnabas, Long Beach
- St. Cornelius, Long Beach
- St. Cyprian, Long Beach
- St. Joseph, Long Beach
- St. Lucy, Long Beach
- St. Maria Goretti, Long Beach
- San Miguel, Los Angeles
- St. Aloysius, Los Angeles
- St. Emydius, Lynwood
- St. Philip Neri, Lynwood
- American Martyrs, Manhattan Beach
- St. Rose of Lima, Maywood
- St. John of God, Norwalk
- St. Linus, Norwalk
- Our Lady of the Rosary, Paramount
- St. Hilary, Pico Rivera
- St. Marianne, Pico Rivera
- St. Albert the Great, Rancho Dominguez
- St. John Fisher, Rancho Palos Verdes
- St. Lawrence Martyr, Redondo Beach
- Holy Trinity, San Pedro
- Mary Star of the Sea, San Pedro
- St. Pius X, Santa Fe Springs
- St. Helen, South Gate
- Nativity, Torrance
- St. Catherine Laboure, Torrance
- St. James, Torrance
- St. Bruno Parish, Whittier
- St. Gregory the Great, Whittier
- St. Mary of the Assumption, Whittier
- Holy Family, Wilmington
- SS. Peter & Paul, Wilmington

== Hospitals ==
The archdiocese no longer operates any hospitals. The MemorialCare Long Beach Medical Center (LBMC) is operated by MemorialCare Health System. The Little Company of Mary/Providence Hospitals in Torrance and San Pedro are operated by Providence Health & Services.

== Cemetery ==
- All Souls Cemetery & Mortuary, 4400 Cherry Avenue, Long Beach. (No Wikipedia page created as of 2024.)

== See also ==
Roman Catholic Archdiocese of Los Angeles

- Our Lady of the Angels Pastoral Region
- San Fernando Pastoral Region
- San Gabriel Pastoral Region
- Santa Barbara Pastoral Region

List of schools in the Roman Catholic Archdiocese of Los Angeles
