= Turbiville =

Turbiville is a surname. Notable people with the surname include:

- Charles Turbiville (1943–2018), American politician

== See also ==
- Turbeville
