= Holy Family Catholic Church (Artesia, California) =

Church in California, United States

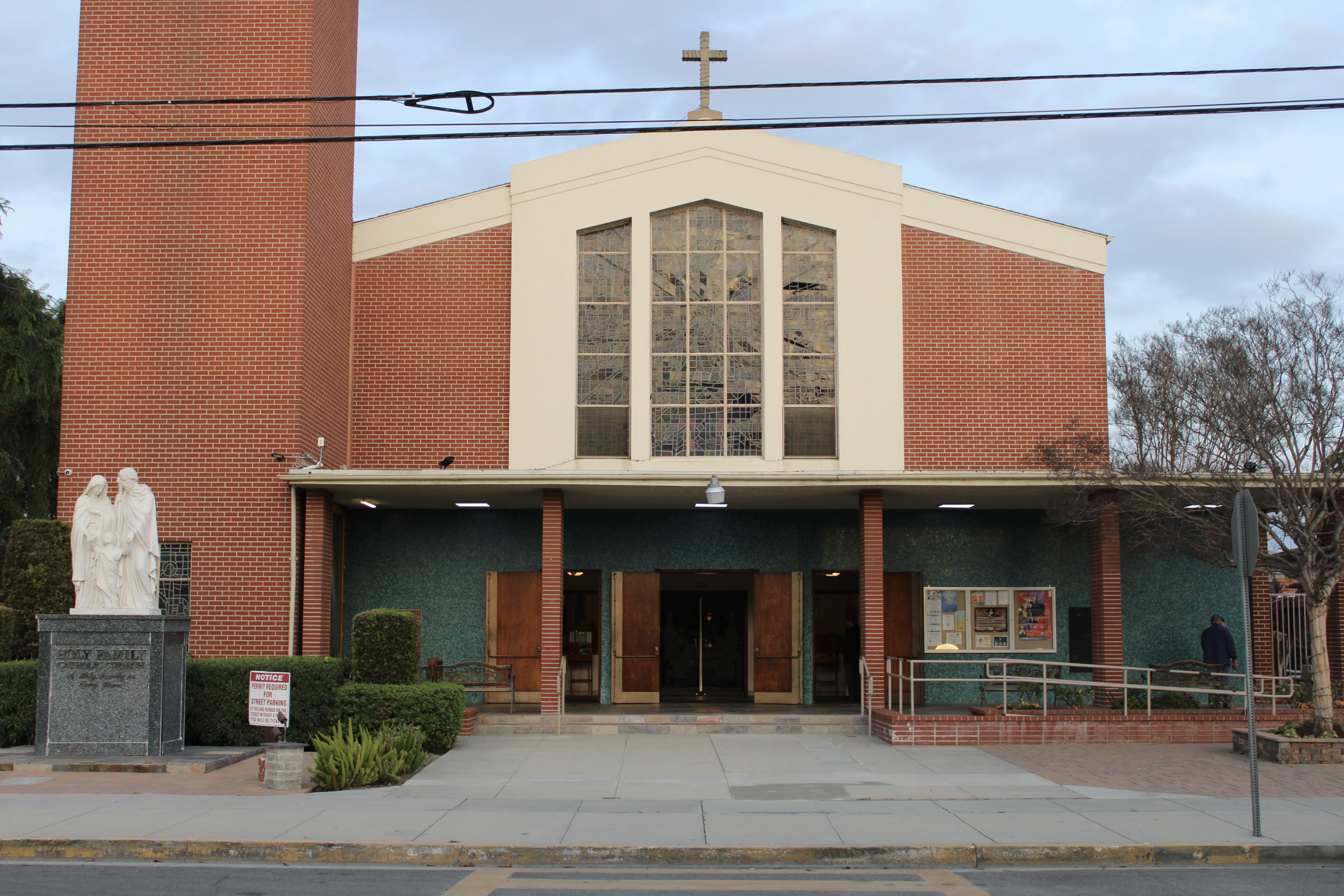
- The front of the church in 2025

- Location within the Los Angeles metropolitan area Location within California Location within the United States
- 33.8622°N 118.0795°W
- Location: Artesia, California
- Address: 18708 Clarkdale Ave, Artesia, CA 90701
- Country: United States
- Languages: English; Spanish; Tagalog; Portuguese; Mandarin Chinese
- Denomination: Catholic
- Website: holyfamilyartesia.org

History
- Status: Church
- Founded: December 25, 1930
- Founder: Fr. Manuel Vicente
- Dedication: The Holy Family of Jesus
- Dedicated: June 14, 1931 (old church); September 29, 1961 (current church)

Architecture
- Functional status: Active
- Style: California mission (old building)
- Years built: 1959–1961
- Groundbreaking: October 18, 1959
- Completed: September 29, 1961
- Construction cost: $5,000 (equivalent to $96,365 in 2025)

Specifications
- Capacity: 1,000 (1961)

Administration
- Division: San Pedro Pastoral Region
- Archdiocese: Roman Catholic Archdiocese of Los Angeles
- Deanery: Deanery 18

Clergy
- Archbishop: José Horacio Gómez
- Priests: Rev. John Ernesto Ma. Cordero, MMHC; Rev. Dominic Melvin Ma. Deniña, MMHC; Rev. Matthew Frederick Ma. Fernandez, MMHC
- Pastor: Rev. John Ernesto Ma. Cordero

Holy Family Catholic Church is a Catholic church located in Artesia, California. Established in 1930, it holds masses in English, Spanish, Tagalog, Portuguese, and Mandarin Chinese. It is named after the Holy Family of Jesus and is a part of the San Pedro Pastoral Region in the Archdiocese of Los Angeles. The church also contains a school, Our Lady of Fatima (OLF), named after one of Mary, mother of Jesus' titles. As of 2014, it has over 15,000 active parish members and 80% of the mass attendees are Filipino as of 2019. Rev. John Ernesto Ma. Cordero, MMHC, currently serves as its pastor. Its logo reads "Go, Therefore, and Make Disciples of All Nations...," quoting Matthew 28:19.

== History ==
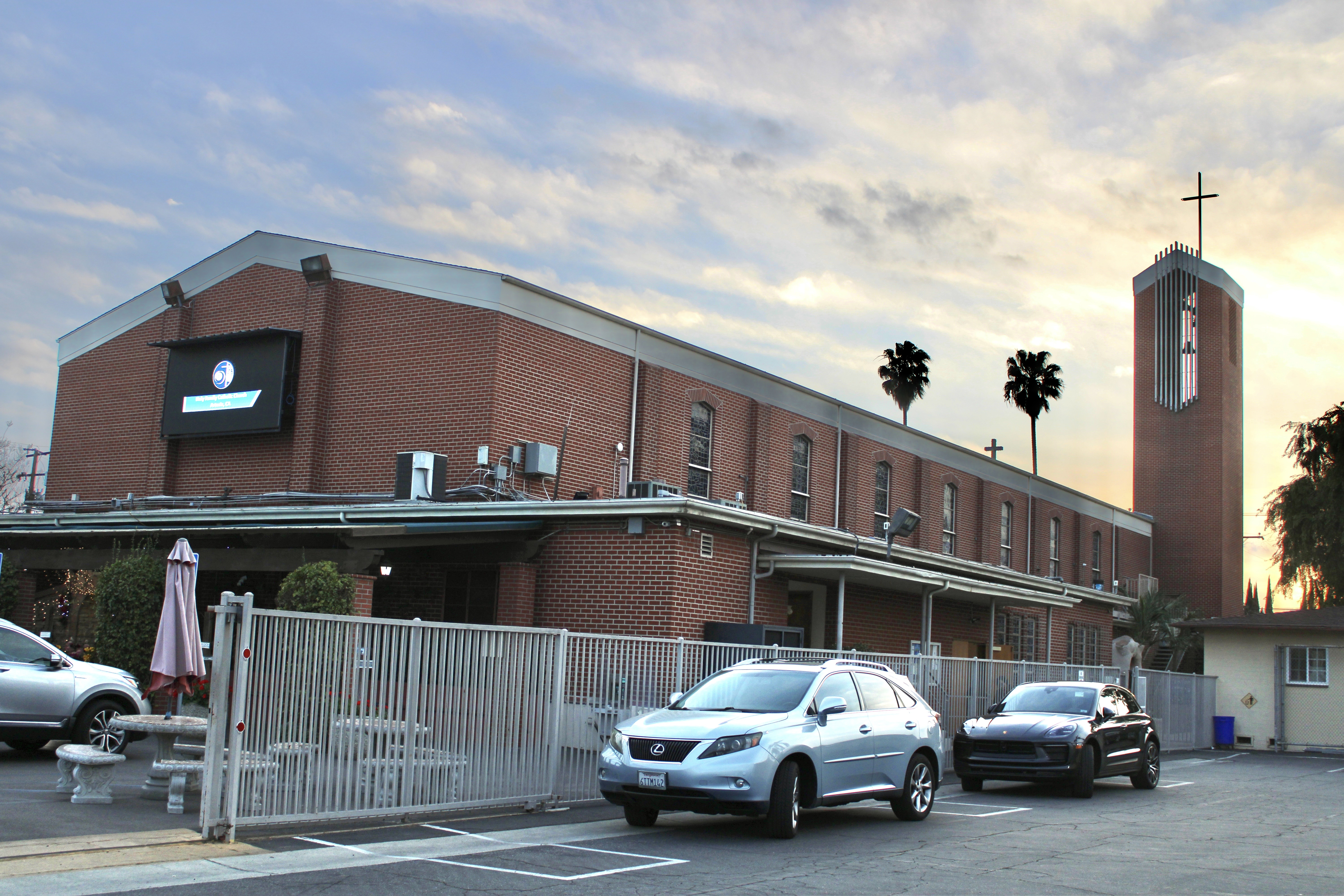
The back of the church in 2025

Before the creation of the church, Artesia already had a sizeable Portuguese population, causing a demand for a church that would hold mass in their native language. Fundraising for it was led by Joaquim Coelho Pinheiro and Elvira da Silva, a married couple devoted to their religion. Fr. Manuel Vicente arrived in Artesia in 1929 and organized church supporters, holding masses in the Scott and Frampton Building until it was completed. Vicente also trained altar servers, had youth classes, created a choir, and formed the first Society of the Holy Name division in the Western Coast of the U.S.

Groundbreaking on the church site took place on the same day it was founded, December 25, 1930. The church was completed six months later, at a cost of $5,000 (equivalent to $96,365 in 2025). It was dedicated on June 14, 1931, by Archbishop John Joseph Cantwell. During the construction, Vicente and his sister Rosa lived in the Parker Hotel on the city's Main Street. After the completion of the church, the diocese purchased a house at 1807 Washington Street. It stayed in use until the 1950s. Some of the debt from building the church was paid for by Vicente's minor role as a priest in the major motion picture Tiger Shark in 1932. He had to ask permission from the Archdiocese before assuming the position.

Vicente's health began to decline, and he died on February 15, 1938, from colorectal cancer. His funeral was held in the Cathedral of Saint Vibiana. Patrick O'Connor, one of Vicente's successors starting in 1943, envisioned the growth of the church to include ministries and religious education. The archdiocese then acquired a location at 187th and Clarkdale measuring 4.5 acres (1.8 ha). To raise funds for the parish school, going door-to-door was the main strategy, with the church being able to raise $50,000 for the complex. The school, Our Lady of Fatima, was named after one of the main contributors to the fundraising, the Our Lady of Fátima Society, and in honor of the Marian apparitions in Portugal in 1917. Joseph Thomas McGucken dedicated the school on August 22, 1948, and it opened on September 13. It was staffed by the Sisters of the Immaculate Heart of Mary when it first opened, staying for over 20 years. In the 1940s and 50s, donations mainly came from dairy farmers in the area, auctioning their cattle to raise money.

With the growing number of parishioners, William Kelly, the pastor at the time, directed the construction of a new church. Groundbreaking took place on October 18, 1959, and was dedicated on September 29, 1961, by James Francis McIntyre. John Twomey, the pastor during the 1980s, created a committee that remodeled the rectory, and added a meeting hall, kindergarten, and computer lab. The Congregation of the Mission administered the church starting in 2004, assigning Johnny Zulueta as the pastor. Roger Mahony assigned the parish to the Marian Missionaries of the Holy Cross in 2010, a Philippine-based congregation, and the two most recent pastors, Raymond Decipeda and John Cordero, are a part of the organization.

During the COVID-19 pandemic, the church had to close down, and masses were held online on Facebook and YouTube through live-streaming. In addition to this, it also held live conversations from a building adjacent to the church property, 18616 Seine Ave, called the Blessed Carlo Acutis Broadcast Center. After the lockdown ended, it was renamed the Youth Ministry Center.

== Architecture and features ==
The old church building is designed in the style of the Spanish missions in California. The current church is made out of red brick. At its opening in 1961, it had a capacity of 1,000 people.

A $60,000 statue of Jesus, Mary, and Joseph, the Holy Family, was made by Rhode Island–based Artisan Granite and placed in the front of the church, being blessed on September 8, 2013. It was vandalized in June 2014, and the community came together to clean it. A replica of Michelangelo's Pietà, also made by Artisan Granite, was installed in June 2014.

On December 12, 2018, the same day as the feast of Our Lady of Guadalupe, a stain appeared on a church-owned sidewalk that had a resemblance to the Virgin Mary. Some reports claim that the image appears blue at certain times. It has been called a miracle due to the fact that it is still standing as of December 2019. A small shrine was created around the apparition to protect it from normal foot traffic. The runoff of sprinklers from the rectory helps maintain the image, tracing it every night.
