= Padre Serra Parish =

Catholic parish in California, US

Coordinates: 34.2393°N 119.0016°W

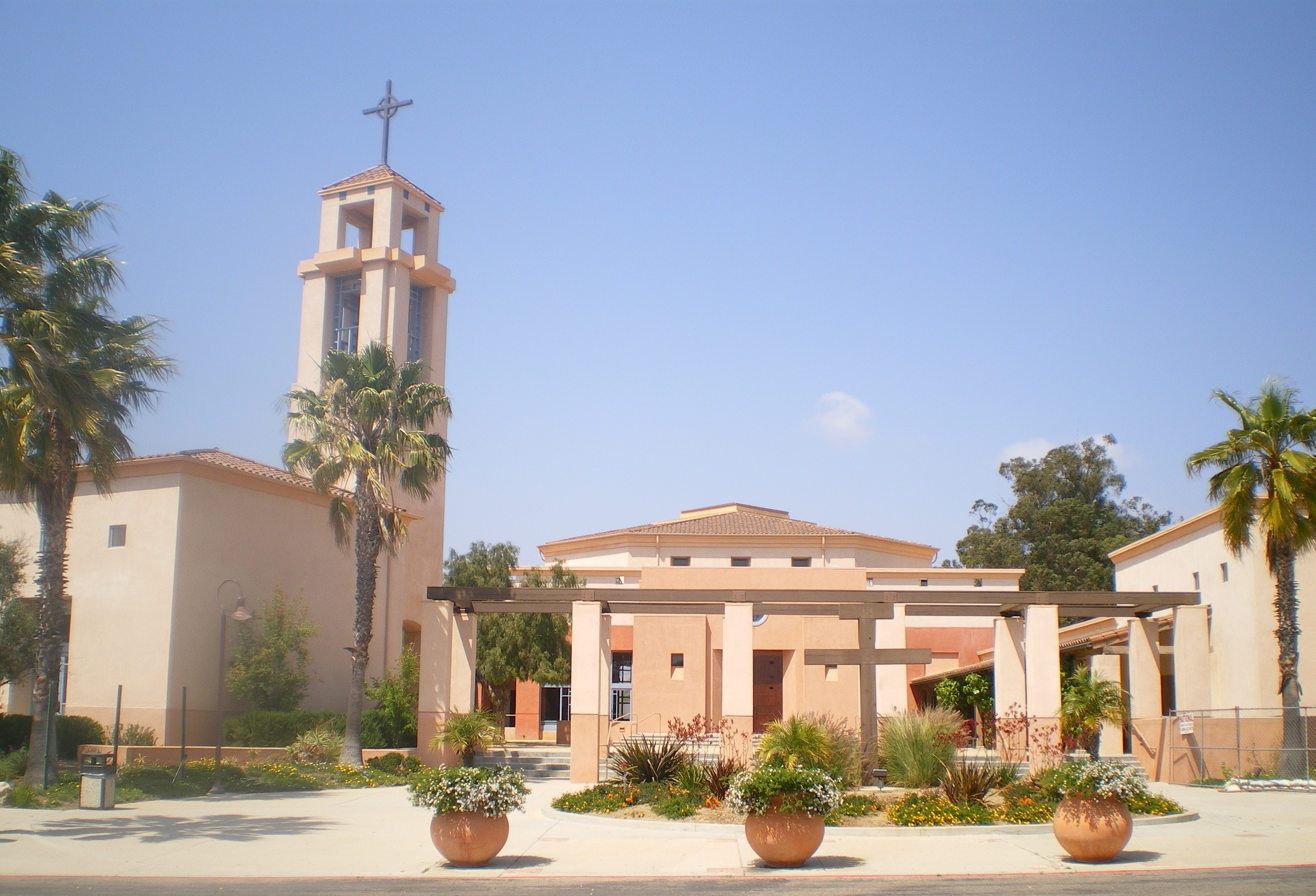
Padre Serra Parish, 2008

Padre Serra Parish is a large Catholic church in Camarillo, California, established in 1988 after the beatification of Father Junípero Serra. For its first seven years, Padre Serra's parish celebrated Mass in a room at St. John's Seminary. In July 1995, a modern 16,300-square foot (1,467 m^{2}) church, without pews or kneelers, and with a centrally located altar, was opened. As of 1995, the parish had more than 5,000 members. In 2007, Padre Serra Church became the home parish of the first married Catholic priest in the Los Angeles Archdiocese.

== History ==
Prior to 1988, the Camarillo area was served by St. Mary Magdalen Church, a parish established in 1910. In 1988, as St. Mary Magdalen was no longer large enough to accommodate the area's growing population, a group of 2,500 parishioners in eastern Camarillo and the Santa Rosa Valley formed a new parish. For the first seven years of its existence, the Padre Serra Church celebrated Mass in the main chapel of St. John's Seminary, located adjacent to the present-day location (while planning and raising funds for the current church building). As of 1995, the parish had 5,000 members. It has been served by three pastors: Father Liam Kidney (1987–1999), Father Jarlath Dolan (1999–2010) and Father Patrick Mullen (2010– ).

== The church buildings ==
A 12-acre (49,000 m^{2}) site on Upland Road adjacent to St. John's Seminary was selected for the new parish's permanent church. When the founding pastor, Father Kidney, first walked the cleared and graded site, he said, "This is one that Serra himself would have chosen: an elevation that commands a view of the sea, of adjacent valleys and of the mountain ridges of Los Padres National Forest to the north." Speaking about his plans for the new church, Father Kidney said, "I would want it to speak for the whole community, of awesomeness, of art, of beauty, of life beyond what we have."

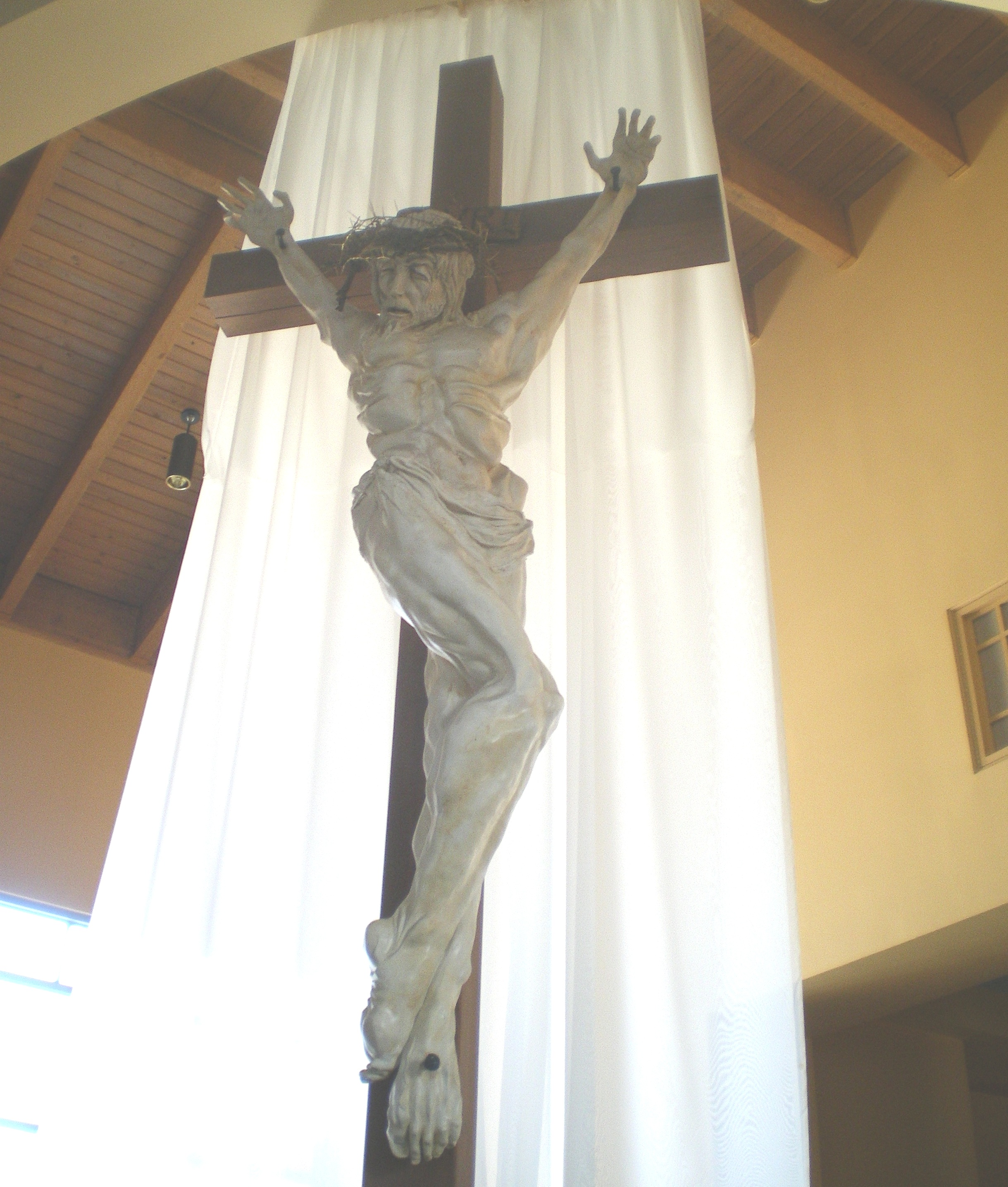
Crucifix at Padre Serra Church

When the new church opened in July 1995, Cardinal Mahony presided at the dedication ceremony. By that time, the parish's membership had grown to 5,000.

The structure, a modern adaptation of the mission-style church, cost $5 million and was designed by architect David Martin, whose grandfather Albert Martin designed Camarillo's first Catholic church, St. Mary Magdalen, in 1910. Shortly before its dedication, the Los Angeles Times reported: "A bell tower announces the building's holy purpose, and multihued, earth-toned walls and a red-tiled roof make it look like a Mediterranean villa." The church building has a number of unusual features, including:

- Unlike the traditional Catholic church, individual wooden seats replace built-in pews and kneelers. The seats are also movable allowing the church to be rearranged for special services.
- In further contrast to the usual rectangular Catholic church with an altar at the front, Padre Serra Church is built in an octagonal shape with the altar in the middle of the room. Architect David Martin noted that, whereas the traditional design served to direct all eyes to the crucifixes and images of Jesus at the altar, his design was intended to put more emphasis on the congregation.
- The tabernacle is not in the main church building, but is instead found in a separate chapel called the Blessed Sacrament Chapel. The tabernacle sits on top of a six-ton (5.4 tonne) granite rock in the center of the Blessed Sacrament Chapel.
- The church has connecting classrooms, offices, chapel, courtyard and 75-foot (23 m) bell tower. Plans were also in the works for a school and biblical garden."
- All parts of the building face a courtyard that has a fountain, California pepper trees and other plants. The courtyard, facing the Santa Monica Mountains, leads directly to the hall of worship, which features vast, wooden ceilings."

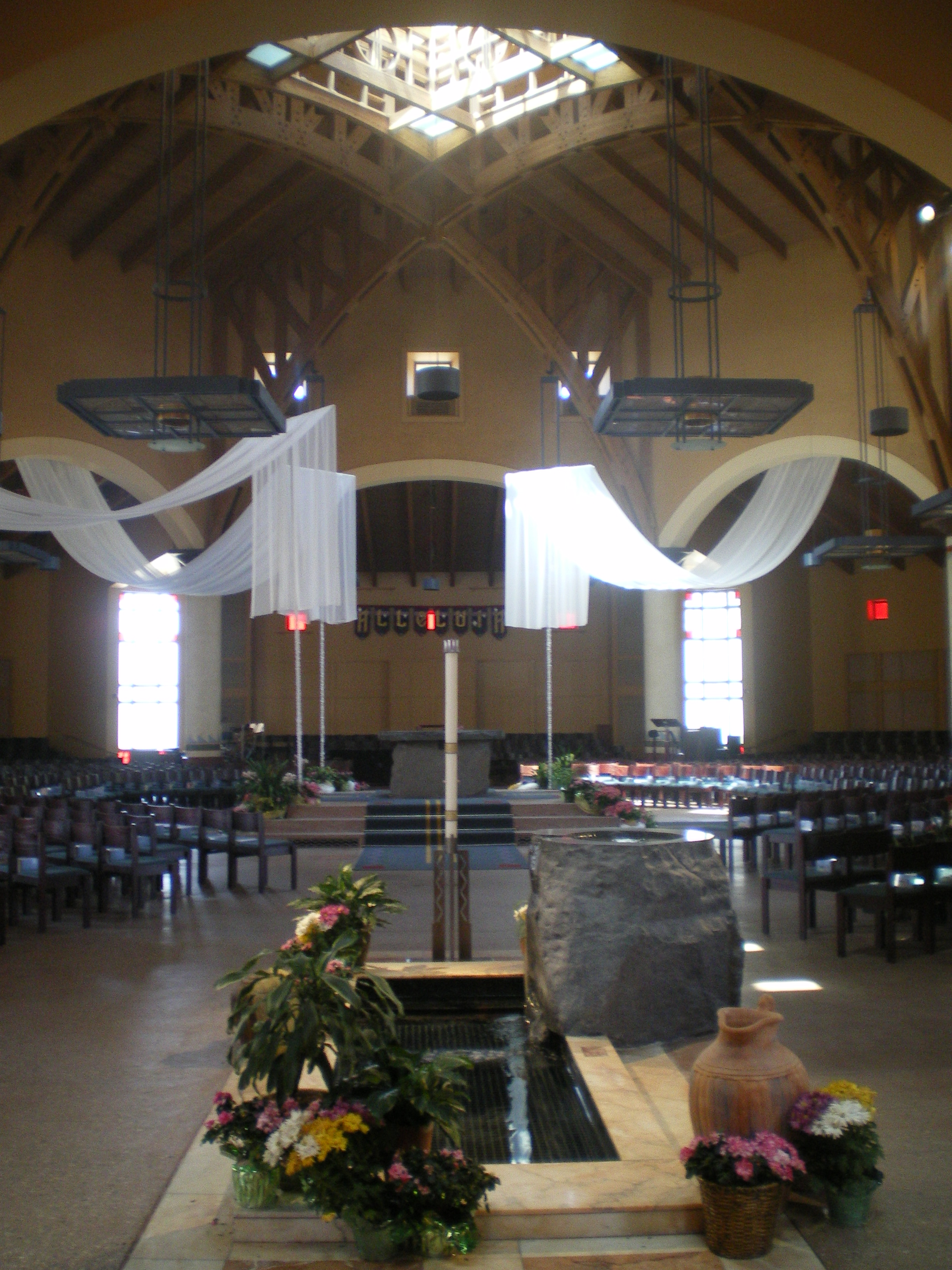
Interior of Padre Serra

- The high ceiling of the structure is highlighted by its large exposed wood beams. The project designer, Ed Holakiewicz, said, "The sanctuary was designed to create a sense of intimacy. The ceiling's exposed wood creates a feeling of warmth, and it gives the impression that everything is reaching toward heaven, toward God."
- Along with its modern elements, the church combines features of the traditional California mission style, including the large wood front doors, bell tower, courtyard, and fountain.

The architect, David Martin, said at the time of the dedication that he believed "the functional, non-traditional design caters to a new generation of churchgoers." Ventura County Supervisor Maggie Kildee, who spoke briefly before the dedication, said the new church would likely become a community landmark since its pink belltower could be seen for miles. Kildee added, "The chapel on the hill in Camarillo will forever be a welcoming landmark for people coming to Ventura County."

The non-traditional design has not met with universal praise. One Catholic publication noted that the church "is an oddly designed building; sort of a theatre in the round." The same reviewer noted the "contorted all-white corpus" of the crucifix mounted on one of the church's columns, creating a vertigo effect, "as one might have in an elevator." The article continued: "There were no stations of the cross, no tabernacle, nothing save the crucifix to imply that this was a Catholic church." Directed to the Blessed Sacrament Chapel, the reviewer found the tabernacle "shaped like a brass Dutch oven upon a rock" and an abstract crucifix "with shells scattered on it in place of a corpus." A 2000 reader's poll in the same publication ranked Padre Serra as one of the top ten churches in the archdiocese for its architecture, noting: "Complete 'village' concept, integrity, and Indian motifs."

== The first married priest in the Los Angeles Archdiocese ==
In 2007, Padre Serra drew national press attention when the Rev. Bill Lowe was assigned to the parish. Rev. Lowe was a retired Episcopal priest from Massachusetts who had been married for 44 years and had three adult children and several grandchildren. After retiring to Camarillo, and becoming a member at Padre Serra, Rev. Lowe opted to seek ordination as a Catholic priest. Under a little-known pastoral law, married clergy who have left the Episcopal Church may seek ordination in the Catholic Church and obtain a waiver of the Catholic celibacy rule. In May 2007, Rev. Lowe was ordained by Cardinal Mahony at Padre Serra Church, making him the first married priest in the Los Angeles Archdiocese.

== Connection with Father Serra ==
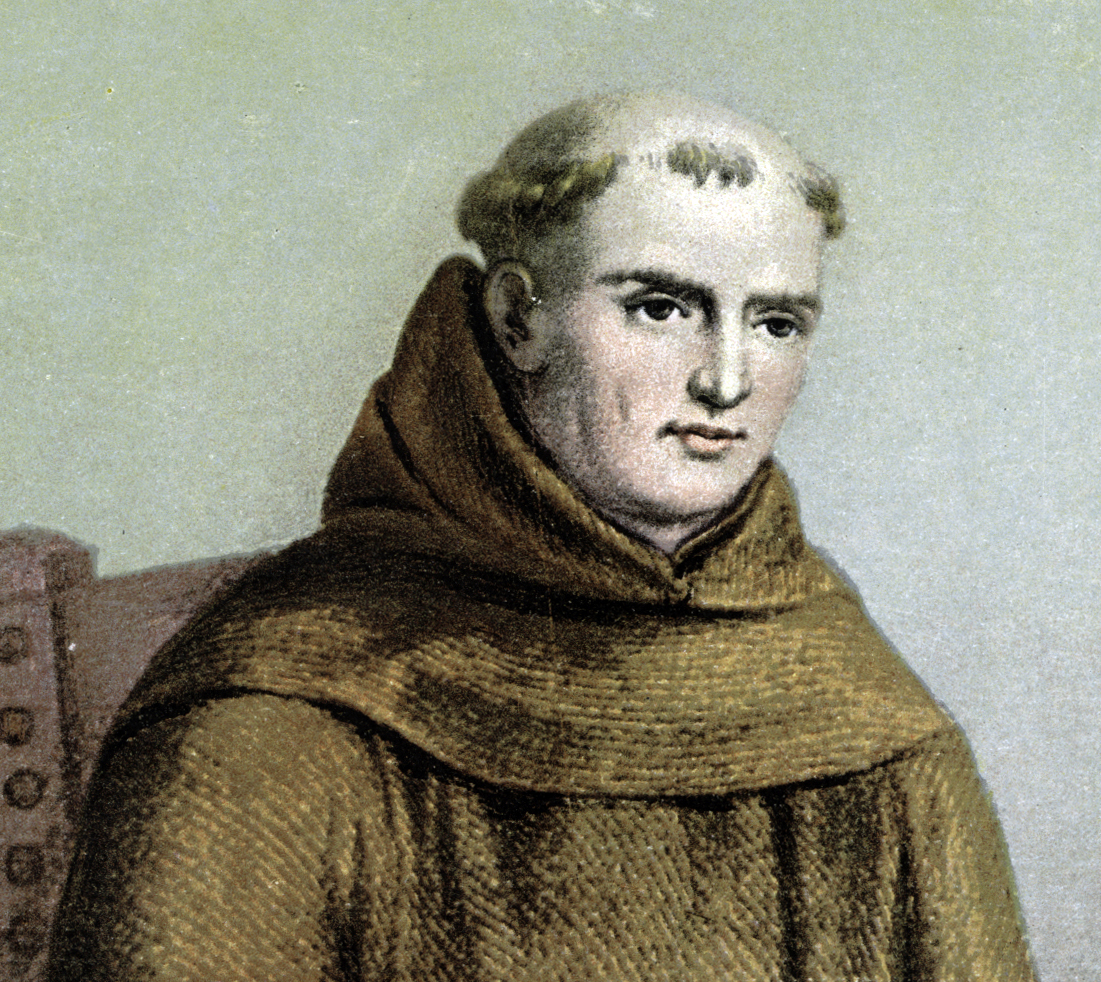
Father Serra

In December 1987, Pope John Paul II announced the beatification of Father Serra, the founder of the California Missions. At that time, the Los Angeles Archdiocese announced that, though beatification is an interim recognition that precedes canonization as a saint, Cardinal Roger Mahony (Archbishop of the Los Angeles Archdiocese) had "taken the extraordinary but not unprecedented step" of petitioning Rome to allow the new parish in Camarillo to be called "Blessed Junipero Serra." The parish's first pastor, Father Liam Kidney, recalled that it was Cardinal Mahony who asked him to name the new church in honor of Father Serra.

The beatification of Father Serra and decision to name two new parishes in his honor led to controversy over Father Serra's treatment of Native Americans at the California missions. California Indian leaders criticized the move and asserted that Father Serra played a part in the destruction of a rich civilization. The controversy was further sparked when Msgr. Francis J. Weber, then director of the San Fernando Mission, was interviewed by the Los Angeles Times and rejected the notion that the Indian population had a rich civilization: "They were on par with what we studied in school as the Stone Age. Now if you think that's a good era to be in, then you can see where you would end up in this ongoing controversy of did we destroy their civilization. In my opinion, they didn't have any civilization to destroy." Weber also dismissed charges that Serra's missions imparted unduly harsh physical discipline, including whippings, on the Indians. Weber noted that "spanked" was a more accurate word: "In Europe of the time, a father spanked his children." A CSUN archeologist responded that the California Indians "had a complex economy, stable villages and elaborate systems of belief in art and religion", and asserted that Weber's comments were "an heir to the kind of thinking that let European societies eradicate whole cultures."

== Pastors ==
The priests who have served as pastor at Padre Serra are:

- Rev. Liam Kidney, 1987–1999
- Rev. Jarlath Dolan, 1999–2010
- Rev. Patrick Mullen, 2010-

== See also ==
- Santa Barbara Pastoral Region
