= Santa Barbara Pastoral Region =

The Santa Barbara Pastoral Region is a division of the Archdiocese of Los Angeles in the Roman Catholic Church. It covers Santa Barbara and Ventura counties in California, an area with a population in excess of 1.2 million.

As of 2024, the pastoral region has 37 parishes, seven high schools, 18 elementary schools and four Spanish missions. It was created in 1986 as part of a plan by Los Angeles Archbishop Roger Mahony to make church leaders more accessible by dividing the archdiocese into five pastoral regions. The pastoral region includes chapels at Naval Base Ventura County, Point Mugu Naval Air Station and Vandenberg Space Force Base. The region is divided into four deaneries.

The Santa Barbara Pastoral region has been governed by four auxiliary bishops since its foundation:

- Auxiliary Bishop Patrick Ziemann (1986 to 1992)
- Auxiliary Bishop Thomas J. Curry, (1994 to 2013). He resigned in 2013 amid allegations that he concealed sexual crimes committed by other priests.
- Auxiliary Bishop Robert E. Barron (2015 to 2022)
- Auxiliary Slawomir Szkredka (September 2023 to present)

== Parishes ==
=== Deanery I (Lompoc, Solvang, Santa Maria and Guadalupe) ===
Parish name	Image	Address	Community
Immaculate Conception		4793 Cebrian Ave.	New Cuyama
La Purisima Concepcion		213 W. Olive Ave.	Lompoc
Mission Santa Inés		1760 Mission Dr.	Solvang
Our Lady of Guadalupe		1164 Obispo St.	Guadalupe
Queen of Angels		3495 Rucker Rd.	Lompoc
St. John Neumann		966 W. Orchard St.	Santa Maria
St. Louis de Montfort		5075 Harp Rd.	Santa Maria
St. Mary of the Assumption		414 E. Church St.	Santa Maria

=== Deanery II (Santa Barbara, Goleta, Montecito and Carpinteria) ===
Parish name	Image	Address	Community
Holy Cross		1740 Cliff Dr.	Santa Barbara
Mission Santa Barbara		2201 Laguna St.	Santa Barbara
Our Lady of Guadalupe		801 Jennings Ave.	Santa Barbara
Our Lady of Mount Carmel		1300 E. Valley Rd.	Montecito
Our Lady of Sorrows		21 E. Sola St.	Santa Barbara
San Roque		325 Argonne Cir.	Santa Barbara
St. Joseph		5048 El Carro Ln.	Carpinteria
St. Mark University Parish (UCSB)		6550 Picasso Rd.	Isla Vista
St. Raphael		5444 Hollister Ave.	Goleta

=== Deanery III (Oxnard, Ventura, Ojai, Fillmore and Santa Paula) ===
Parish name	Image	Address	Community
Mary, Star of the Sea		463 W. Pleasant Valley Rd.	Port Hueneme
Mission Basilica San Buenaventura		211 E. Main St.	Ventura
Our Lady of Guadalupe		500 N. Juanita Ave.	Oxnard
Our Lady of Guadalupe		427 N. Oak St.	Santa Paula
Our Lady of the Assumption		3175 Telegraph Rd.	Ventura
Sacred Heart		10800 Henderson Rd.	Saticoy
Santa Clara Chapel (Mission)		1333 E. Ventura Blvd.	El Rio
Santa Clara Church		323 S E Street	Oxnard
St. Anthony		2511 S. C St.	Oxnard
St Francis of Assisi		1048 W. Ventura St.	Fillmore
St. Sebastian		235 N. Ninth St.	Santa Paula
St. Thomas Aquinas		185 St. Thomas Dr.	Ojai

=== Deanery IV (Simi Valley, Westlake Village, Thousand Oaks, Moorpark and Camarillo) ===
Parish name	Image	Address	Community
Holy Cross		13955 Peach Hill Rd.	Moorpark
St. Jude the Apostle		32032 W. Lindero Canyon Rd.	Westlake Village
St. Julie Billiart		2475 Borchard Rd.	Newbury Park
St. Junipero Serra		5205 Upland Rd.	Camarillo
St. Mary Magdalen		2532 Ventura Blvd.	Camarillo
St. Maximilian Kolbe		5801 Kanan Rd.	Westlake Village
St. Paschal Baylon		155 E. Janss Rd.	Thousand Oaks
St. Peter Claver		5649 E. Pittman St.	Simi Valley
St. Rose of Lima		1305 Royal Ave.	Simi Valley

== California Missions ==
- Mission La Purisima Concepcion, 2295 Purisima Rd., Lompoc
- Mission Santa Ines, 1760 Mission Dr., Solvang
- Mission Santa Barbara, 2201 Laguna St., Santa Barbara
- Mission San Buenaventura, 211 E. Main St., Ventura

== Other Missions ==
- Christ the King Mission, 535 Cooper Rd, La Colonia, Oxnard
- Santa Clara Chapel, 1333 E Ventura Blvd, El Rio
- St. Anthony, 270 Helena Street, Los Alamos
- San Ramon Chapel, Forest Rte 10N06, Sisquoc
- San Salvador,4045 E Center Drive, Piru

== Private Roman Catholic Chapels ==
- Santa Cruz Chapel, on Santa Cruz Island near the Stanton Ranch
- Rancho Camulos Chapel, along the 126 Freeway between Fillmore and Piru
- Santa Clara del Norte Rancho Chapel, at the Lloyd-Butler Ranch, Saticoy

== Universities, colleges and novitiates ==
- St. John's Seminary, Camarillo
- Thomas Aquinas College, Santa Paula
- San Lorenzo OFM, Capuchin Novitiate, Santa Ynez
- Santa Barbara Mission OFM Interprovincial Novitiate, Santa Barbara
- Dom Grea House, Canons of the Immaculate Conception (CRIC) Novitiate, Santa Paula

== High schools ==
- Bishop Garcia Diego High School, Santa Barbara
- St. Bonaventure High School, Ventura
- St. Joseph High School, Santa Maria
- Santa Clara High School, Oxnard
- Villanova Preparatory School, Ojai

== Elementary schools ==
- Holy Cross STEM School, Ventura
- La Purisima Concepcion Catholic School, Lompoc
- Notre Dame School, Santa Barbara
- Our Lady of the Assumption School, Ventura
- Our Lady of Guadalupe Parish School, Oxnard
- Our Lady of Mount Carmel School, Montecito
- Sacred Heart School, Ventura
- St. Anthony School, Oxnard
- St. Jude the Apostle School, Westlake Village
- St. Mary of the Assumption School, Santa Maria
- St. Louis de Montfort School, Santa Maria
- St. Mary Magdalen School, Camarillo
- St. Paschal Baylon School, Thousand Oaks
- St. Raphael School, Goleta
- St. Rose of Lima School, Simi Valley
- St. Sebastian School, Santa Paula
- Santa Clara Elementary School, Oxnard

== Hospitals ==
The archdiocese no longer operates any hospitals. The three Catholic hospital in the region are operated by Dignity Health, an independent non-profit organization:

- Marian Regional Medical Center, Santa Maria
- St. John's Pleasant Valley Hospital, Camarillo
- St. John's Regional Medical Center, Oxnard

== Cemeteries ==
- Assumption Cemetery & Mausoleum, Simi Valley
- Calvary Cemetery & Mausoleum, Santa Barbara
- Santa Clara Cemetery & Mortuary, Oxnard

== See also ==
Roman Catholic Archdiocese of Los Angeles

- Our Lady of the Angels Pastoral Region
- San Fernando Pastoral Region
- San Gabriel Pastoral Region
- San Pedro Pastoral Region

List of schools in the Roman Catholic Archdiocese of Los Angeles
