= Dayle Hammock =

American politician (1947–2024)

Member of the South Dakota House of Representatives from the 31st district
- In office 2019–2020
- Preceded by: Charles Turbiville
- Succeeded by: Scott Odenbach; Mary Fitzgerald

Personal details
- Born: August 9, 1947
- Died: July 21, 2024 (aged 76)
- Party: Republican

Dayle D. Hammock (August 9, 1947 – July 21, 2024) was an American politician who served as a member of the South Dakota House of Representatives from 2019 to 2020, representing District 31. He was appointed by Governor Kristi Noem to fill the vacancy of Charles Turbiville.

Hammock lost the Republican primary to Scott Odenbach and Mary Fitzgerald on June 2, 2020.

Hammock died on July 21, 2024, at the age of 76.
