= William Yancey Brown =

American conservationist

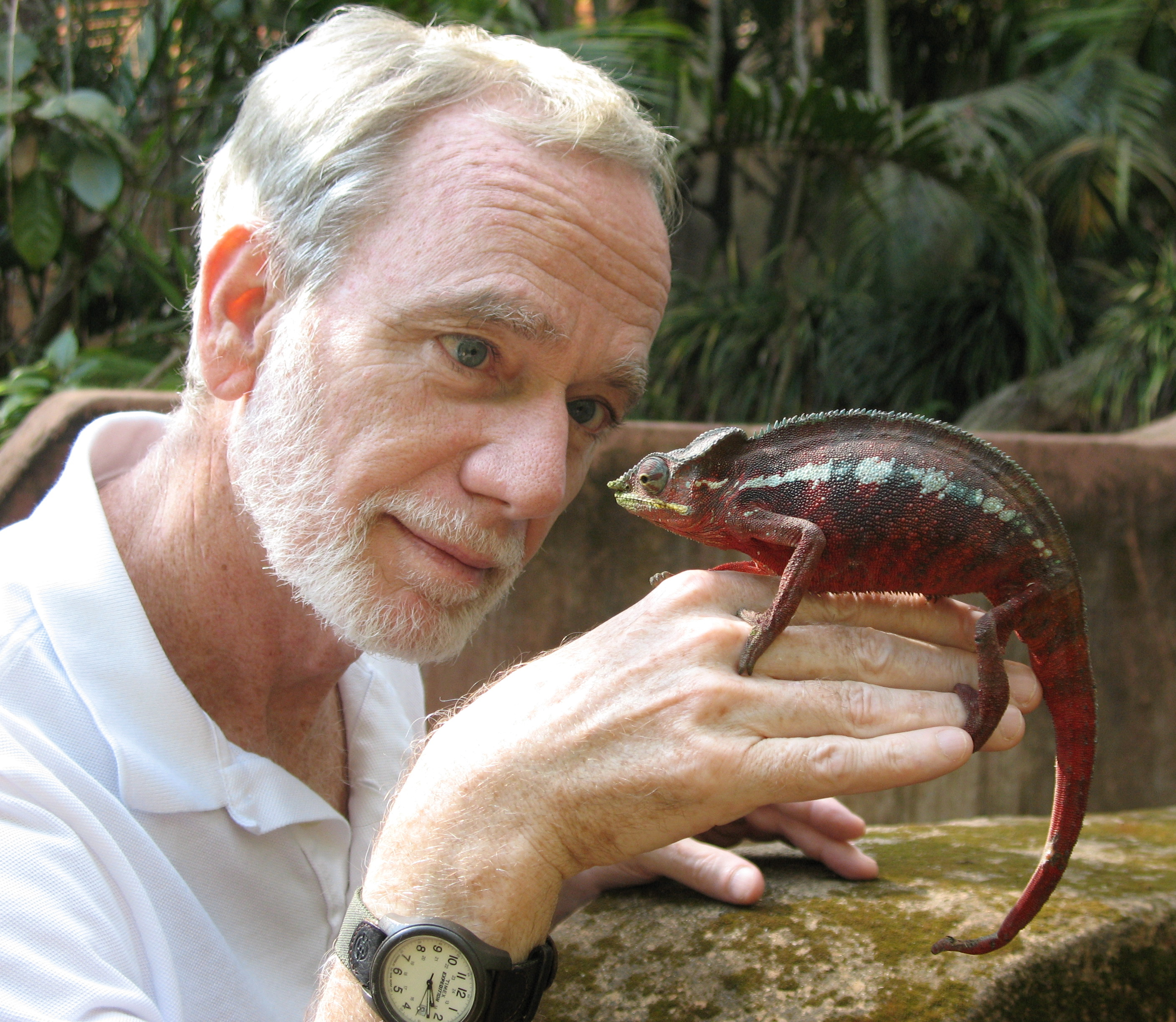
- Born: August 13, 1948 (age 77); Artesia, California

William Y. Brown (born August 13, 1948) is a zoologist and attorney. He is currently a nonresident senior fellow with the Atlantic Council after retiring in 2024 as the chief environmental officer of the Bureau of Ocean Energy Management in the Department of the Interior. He is a former nonresident senior fellow at the Brookings Institution, a former science advisor to U.S. Secretary of the Interior Bruce Babbitt, a former president of the Bishop Museum in Hawaii, a former president of the Academy of Natural Sciences in Philadelphia, Pennsylvania, and a former president of the Woods Hole Research Center in Falmouth, Massachusetts.

== Biography ==
Brown was born in Artesia, California, on August 13, 1948, and graduated from high school in Brazil at the Escola Americana do Recife. He later graduated from the University of Virginia (BA 1969, Biology, with highest distinction), Johns Hopkins University (MAT, 1970), the University of Hawaiʻi where he was an NSF Fellow (Ph.D., 1973, Zoology), and Harvard Law School (JD, 1977).

== Professional life ==
From 1973 to 1974, Brown was assistant professor of biological sciences at Mount Holyoke College in Massachusetts. During law school, he held summer and consulting positions with the Environmental Protection Agency (1974), Council on Environmental Quality (1975), and the Department of the Interior (1976–77).

In 1977, Brown was appointed executive secretary of the U.S. Endangered Species Scientific Authority, overseeing treaty commitments for wildlife trade. In 1980, he was appointed executive secretary of the International Convention Advisory Commission, with similar responsibilities. Brown left government in 1981 with a change in administration, and by 1983 was senior scientist for the Environmental Defense Fund.

In 1985, Brown joined Waste Management, Inc. and was vice president for environmental planning and programs and the first chairman of the firm's executive environmental committee. He advocated protection of biological diversity and limiting waste exports to developing countries. Brown left WMI in October 1994 and worked as a consultant, first with Hagler Bailly Consulting as a principal and later with the World Wildlife Fund as a senior fellow.

Brown served with U.S. Secretary of the Interior Bruce Babbitt as science advisor from April 1997 until January 2001. There, he advocated, wrote and negotiated executive orders for coral reef protection and invasive species management issued by President William Clinton and orders of Secretary Bruce Babbitt establishing marine national wildlife refuges for Navassa Island off Haiti and Palmyra Atoll and Kingman Reef south of Hawaii.

On leaving the government with a change in administration, he served as vice president for oceans and science policy at the National Audubon Society before being recruited by the Bishop Museum, where he served as president and CEO from October 2001 to January 2007. He is credited with stabilizing the museum both financially and politically, improving attendance and successfully undertaking several expansions and renovations. He served as president and CEO of the Academy of Natural Sciences from February 2007 to January 2010. He served as president and CEO of the Woods Hole Research Center from February 2010 to January 2011. He was a nonresident senior fellow at the Brookings Institution from June 2011 until November 2013, when he was appointed the chief environmental officer of the Bureau of Ocean Energy Management. He served in that position until June 2024 and was appointed a nonresident senior fellow at the Atlantic Council in October 2024. Brown has written articles published by the council addressing AI and NEPA, deep sea mining, energy and minerals in the Atlantic, and engaging AI for development in Africa.
