= Travis Scott (American football) =

American football player (born 1979)

Profile
- Position: Guard

Personal information
- Born: August 9, 1979 (age 47); Artesia, California, U.S.
- Listed height: 6 ft 6 in (1.98 m)
- Listed weight: 300 lb (136 kg)

Career information
- College: Arizona State
- NFL draft: 2002: 4th round, 130th overall pick

Career history
- 2002: St. Louis Rams
- 2003: New York Giants

Travis Scott (born August 8, 1979) is an American former professional football guard in the National Football League (NFL). He was selected by the St. Louis Rams in the fourth round of the 2002 NFL draft with the 130th overall pick. He played that pre-season with the Rams and was released. He also spent the following pre-season with the New York Giants.
