= Saints Peter and Paul's Church, Los Angeles =

Coordinates: 33.78289°N 118.26773°W

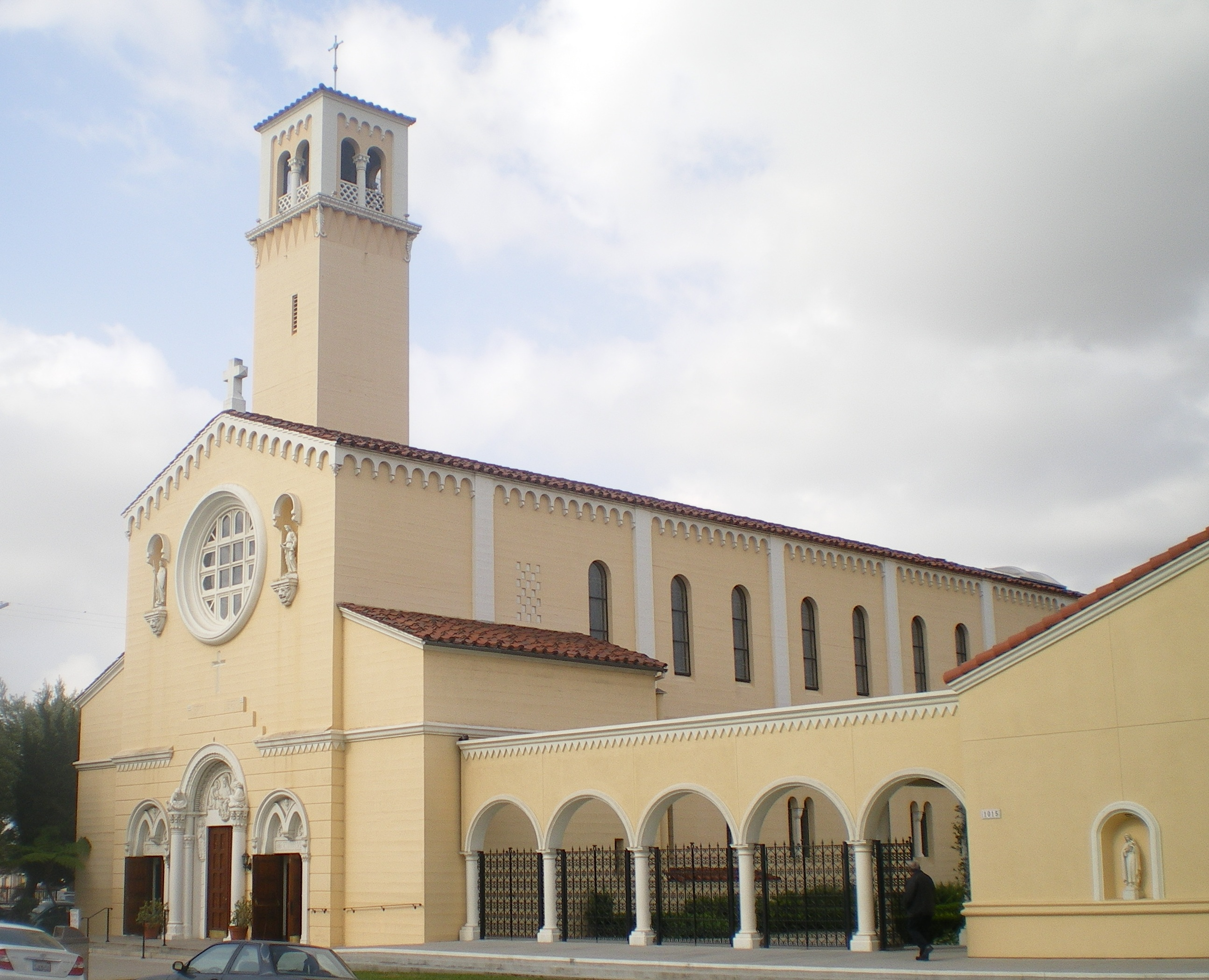
SS. Peter and Paul Church, Wilmington

Saints Peter and Paul Roman Catholic Church, established in 1865 in Wilmington, Los Angeles, California, is one of the oldest parishes in the Archdiocese of Los Angeles.

The current church building, located on a tract fronting Lagoon Street and bounded by J and Ravenna Streets, was planned and built between 1928 and 1930, during the pastorate of Father Bernardino J. Schiaparelli. It was built at a cost of $200,000. It replaced the former church at Anaheim Street and Bay View Avenue. The first mass in the church was a midnight mass on December 24, 1930.

The formal dedication followed on March 15, 1931, with Bishop John Joseph Cantwell officiating. A mass honoring Father Schiaparelli was held in the new church in July 1931.

The building was designed by architects Henry Carleton Newton and Robert Dennis Murray in the Italian Renaissance style. It was built from concrete, steel and ornamental tile, featuring an arched entrance and a 209-foot bell tower topped by a 14-foot solid bronze cross weighing 600 pounds. The Baldacchin, or canopy, above the altar, was made of a large silica stone and was modeled on the Baldacchin in the Pantheon, Rome. The altars were specially made in Italy and were the gifts of George Allan Hancock and Louis Denni.

During the year 2000 Jubilee, it was proclaimed as a Pilgrimage Church and recognized as the Historic Faith Center of the San Pedro Pastoral Region. It is currently run by the Norbertine Fathers of St. Michael's Abbey (Orange County, California).
