= Kimberly Duran =

American muralist (born 1989)

Kimberly "Shmi" Duran (born 1989) is an American Chicana muralist, based in Santa Ana, California. She is a co-founder of The Heavy Collective.

== Biography ==
Kimberly "Shmi" Duran was born in 1989, in Artesia, California, and is first-generation Chicana. She grew up in Santa Ana, California. Her childhood travel to Mexico heavily influenced her early art.

In 2013, she started The Heavy Collective, a community public art initiative, with Bud Herrera ("Delt one"). Their joint work is inspired by the Marcus Garvey quote, "A people without the knowledge of their past history, origin, and culture is like a tree without roots." According to Voice of OC, Duran's contributions to Santa Ana's mural scene have been instrumental in reclaiming public spaces for underrespresented communities, reinforcing Chicano and indigenous heritage through visual storytelling.

== Art ==
Duran's art work is primarily a reclamation of graffiti and chicano art. Her media of choice are aerosol and acrylic. She specializes in large-scale murals. Orange Coast Magazine highlighted her unique ability to blend traditional iconography with contemporary street art, making her murals both culturally significant and accessible to the public.

In 2013, Duran led the community mural project Madre Naturaleza. It is located in Downtown Santa Ana on the rear wall of Macre's flower shop. The process engaged local artists, youth, business, and residents in the art-making process. The mural itself was inspired by the community interview process, with the final piece representing the dreams and aspirations of Santa Ana residents.

The Heavy Collective has received grants to produce their work. Between 2017 and 2019, Duran used this grant money to create an art wall that was easily accessible to the community and had rotating features to exhibit multiple artwork. The first mural painted on this wall was Chinatown Burning, which memorialized the 1906 fire that destroyed the Santa Ana Chinatown and took the life of a man residing in the location where the art was displayed. That art has been painted over one of her most notable work was birthed from that project and is titled Creator Quetzalcoatl (2018). As Voice of OC reports, the mural has become a defining element of Santa Ana's public art scene, serving as a vibrant representation of indigenous mythology and Chicano heritage.

Duran's art brings together iconography from multiple cultures, like Buddhas, Ajna, and agapes. Through her work she aims to bring art to public spaces in order to expose her community to art that they are not able to view in museums or galleries. Through this interpersonal connection with her community, Duran also aims to support the youth by teaching them about art and advocating and providing public spaces for them to channel their own artistic voices as well.

While most of Duran and Herrera's works are murals, they also practice digital art, canvas work, and videography. Some of her works have been recognized in a "Mapping Arts" Database conducted by the department of Humanities and Social Sciences of California State University Fullerton. She also had a part in creating a mural for the Santa Ana Family Justice Center.

In 2020 Duran won a poster contest for California Strawberry Festival in Ventura county.

In 2020, Duran and Herrera created Inner Self.
