= Artesia, California =

City in California, United States

- City
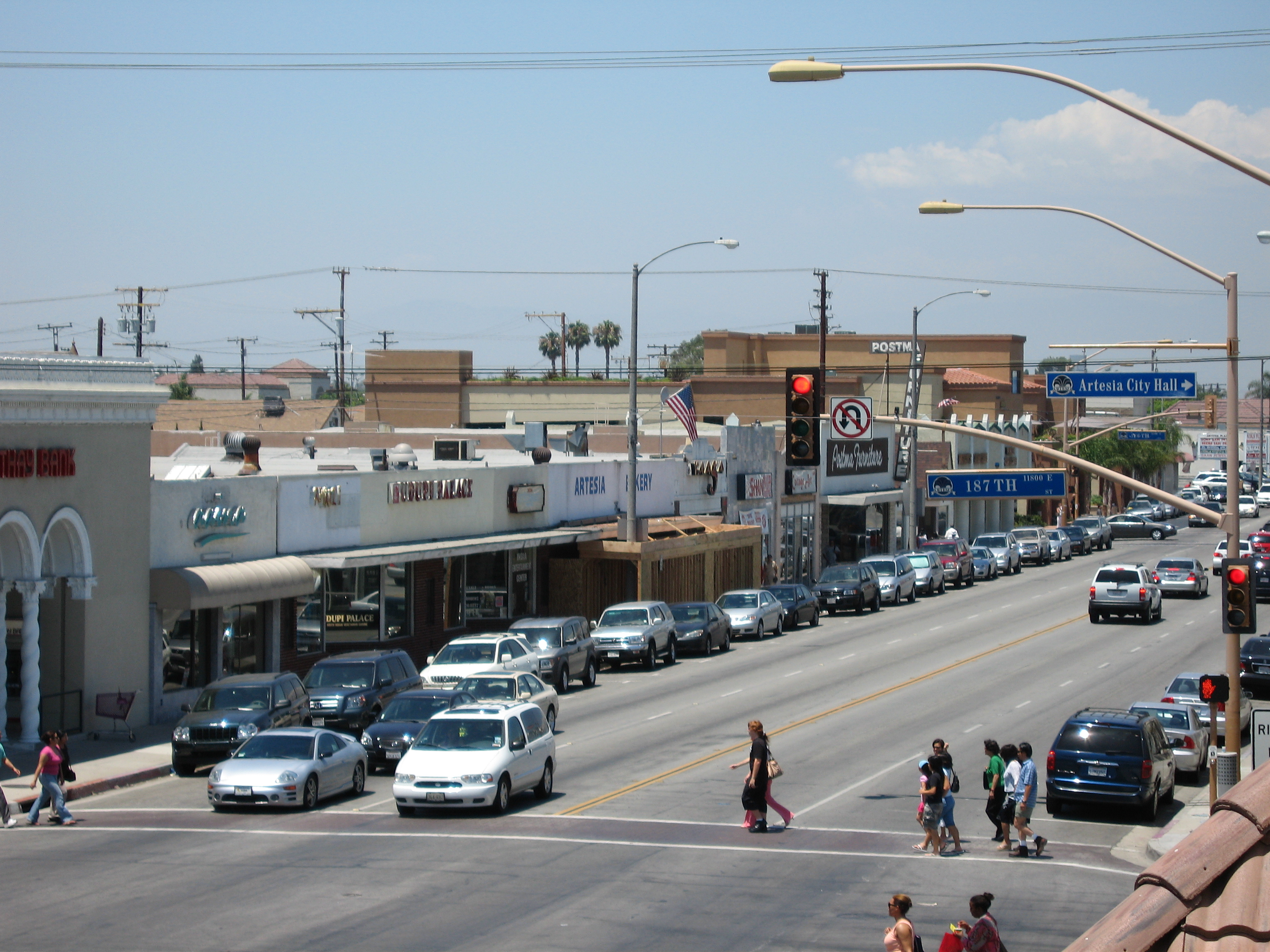
- Pioneer Boulevard in Artesia, California

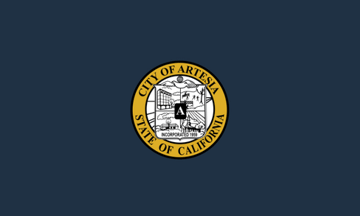
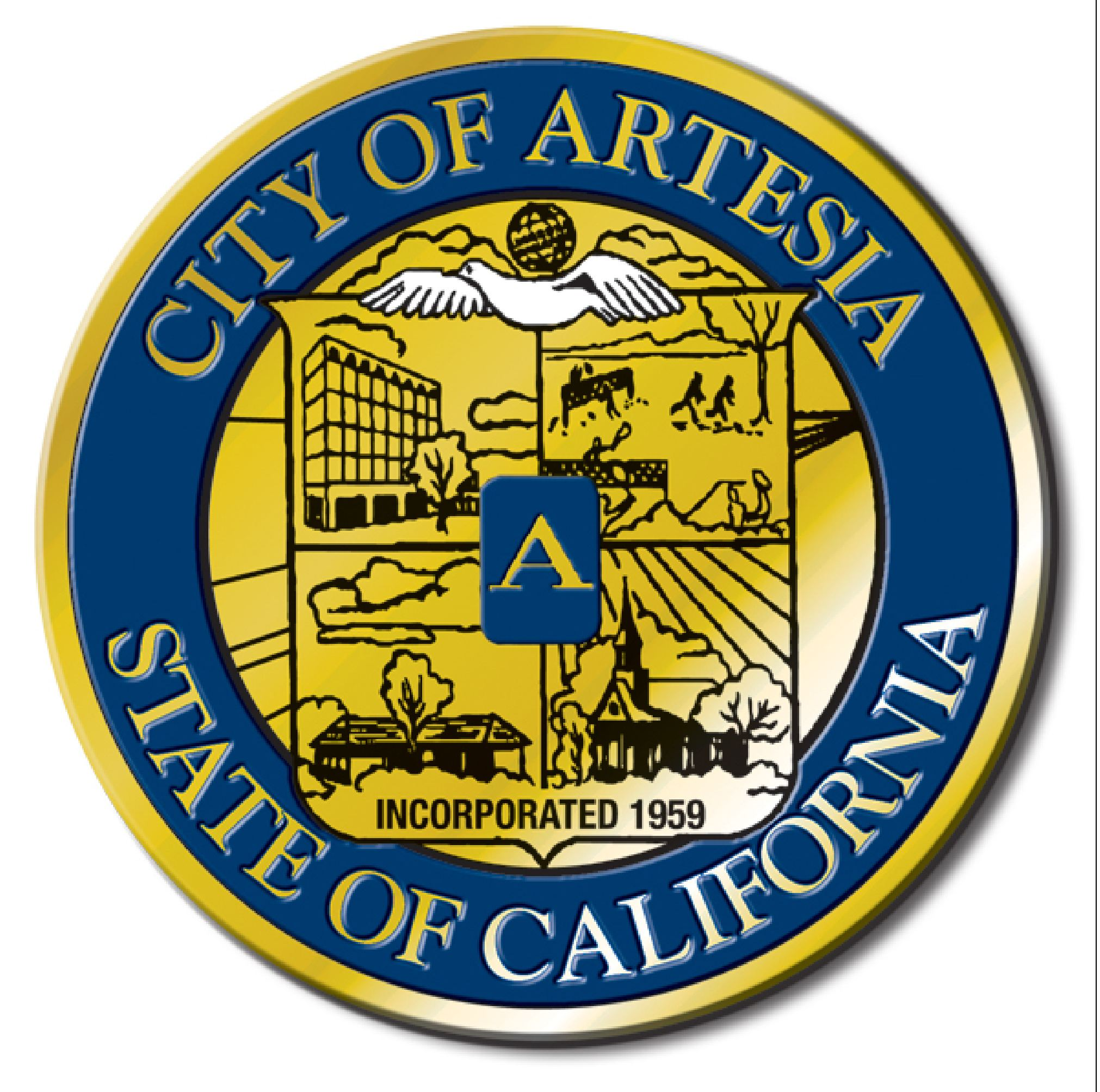
- Flag Seal
- Motto: "Service Builds Tomorrow's Progress"
- Interactive map of Artesia, California
- Location in California Artesia (the United States) Artesia (North America)
- Coordinates: 33°52′2″N 118°4′50″W
- Country: United States
- State: California
- County: Los Angeles
- Incorporated: May 29, 1959
- Named for: The local artesian wells

Government
  - Type: council-manager government
  - Mayor: Anthony Couto
  - Mayor Pro Tem: Dave Lima
  - City Council: Ved Shah; Monica Manalo; Zeel Ahir
  - City Manager: Able Avalos

Area
  - Total: 1.62 sq mi (4.20 km^{2})
  - Land: 1.62 sq mi (4.20 km^{2})
  - Water: 0 sq mi (0.00 km^{2}) 0%
- Elevation: 52 ft (16 m)

Population (2020)
  - Total: 16,395
  - Density: 10,117.5/sq mi (3,906.37/km^{2})
- Time zone: UTC-8 (PST)
  - Summer (DST): UTC-7 (PDT)
- ZIP codes: 90701
- Area code: 562
- FIPS code: 06-02896
- GNIS feature IDs: 1660272, 2409735
- Website: www.cityofartesia.us

Artesia (Spanish for "artesian aquifer") is a city in southeastern Los Angeles County, California, United States. Artesia was incorporated on May 29, 1959, and is one of Los Angeles County's Gateway Cities. The city has a 2020 census population of 16,395. Artesia is surrounded on the west, south, and east sides by Cerritos, with Norwalk to the north. Artesia is the home of the East West Ice Palace, an ice rink which is co-owned by Michelle Kwan. It was also the childhood home of former First Lady Pat Nixon, who lived there from 1914 to 1931, though the property on which she grew up is now part of neighboring Cerritos.

== History ==
The village of Artesia was formally established following the creation of the Artesia School District on May 3, 1875. The first schoolhouse, a two-story building with a classroom on each floor, was built on the corner of 183rd and Alburtis Street; 44 students were enrolled upon its opening. The original schoolhouse was originally moved and converted to a store when Pioneer School was built in 1910. Its bell was given to Artesia Christian Church with the condition that it must never be taken out of Artesia. The city was named for the many natural flowing artesian wells in the area, which made the village ideal for farming and agriculture. Grape growing became a popular industry—by 1885, Artesia began selling grapes to wineries in Downey and Anaheim. Artesia Cemetery was designated as a public cemetery in 1928. Before the city's incorporation, the Artesia Chamber of Commerce was the main liaison between the citizens and Los Angeles County. John H. "Doc" Niemes served as the president of the organization in 1925.

In the early 1920s, dairymen, mainly of Portuguese ancestry, arrived in Artesia from the San Joaquin Valley to ease a shortage. Fr. Manuel Vicente founded the Holy Family Catholic Church upon his arrival in 1929. Dutch dairymen also arrived in the 1920s, with the Artesia Reformed Church being formed in 1932. Upon its move to South Norwalk Boulevard in 1970, it changed its name to New Life Community Church. The city was heavily affected by the 1933 Long Beach earthquake, which resulted in two deaths and much structural damage. The city was affected by large floods in early 1952; Queen Juliana of the Netherlands visited later that year. The Artesia Dairyland Fair was held for ten years starting from 1953.

After World War II, as with many other cities in the region, Artesia was pressured by developers to build residential tracts. The city of Dairy Valley was incorporated in 1956, and later became the city of Cerritos. As the demand for housing continued, dairymen moved their operations further east into Chino and north into the Central Valley. Artesia finally incorporated on May 29, 1959. The city's first mayor was W. E. "Gene" Padelford. In 1960, Artesia became sister cities with Koudekerk aan den Rijn in the Netherlands. The cities conducted the first sister city satellite phone call ever on July 26, 1962. In 1971, a vote was held on consolidating Artesia with Cerritos, but it was rejected, with 54.4% of citizens wanting to stay separate. A new city hall on Clarkdale Avenue was dedicated on the 100th anniversary of the city's founding, May 3, 1975.

In 1993, the Artesia Historical Society was formed, with the mission of preserving and protecting the archives and historic sites of the city. In 2002, the Historical Society salvaged and restored one of the last remaining Spanish-styled homes in the city into a historical civic museum open to the public.

== Characteristics ==
=== Artesia Water Tower ===
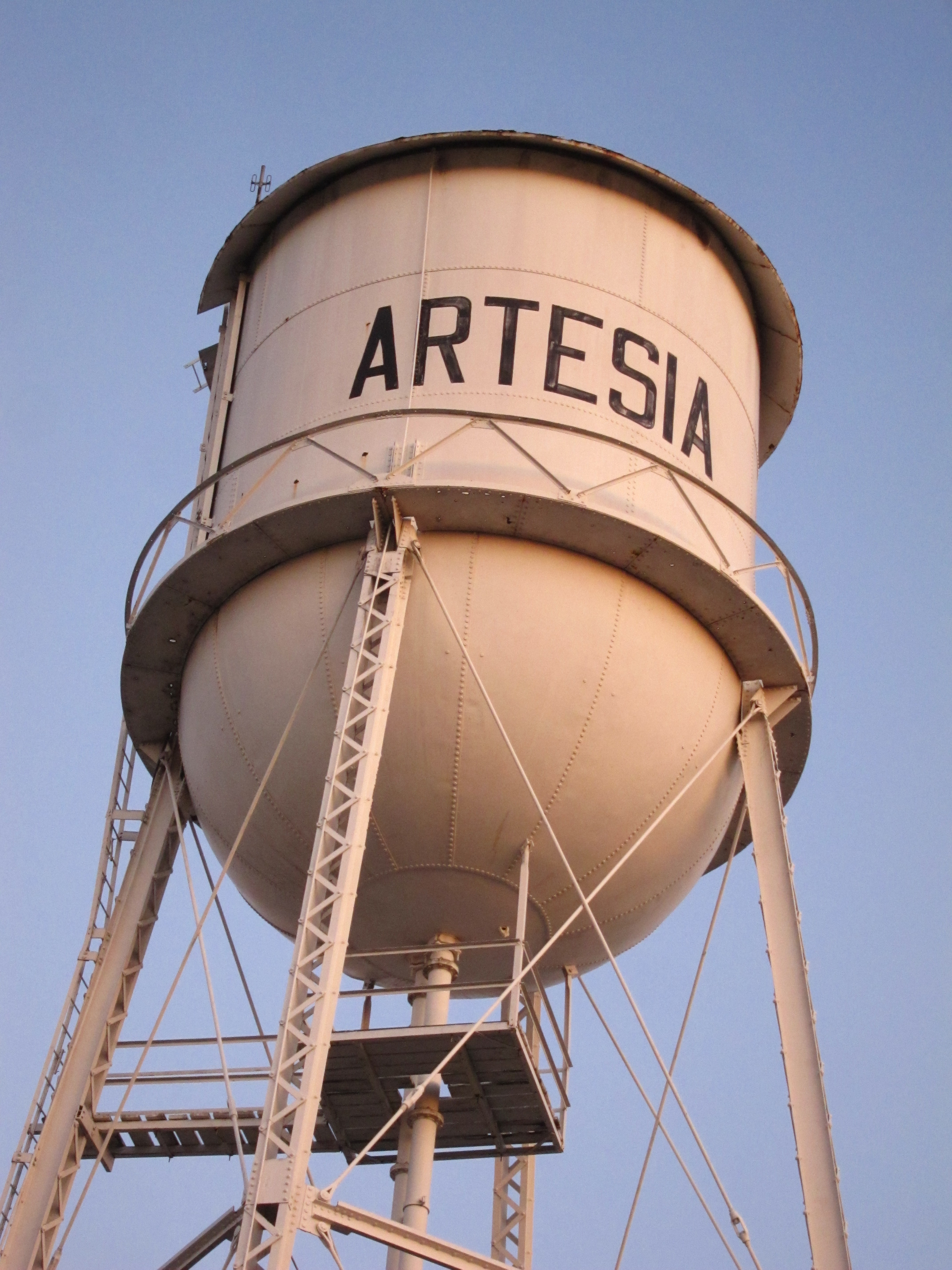
Artesia Water Tower

One of the more familiar landmarks in the city is the Artesia water tower. Not much is known about its active past or when it was constructed. The City of Artesia is currently trying to have the tower declared as a Historical Landmark and is asking its citizens for historical information and photos of the tower.

=== Cultural Shopping District ===
There are a large number of Indian-owned stores and restaurants along Pioneer Boulevard in Artesia. Despite this concentration of Indian-owned businesses, Asian Indians made up only 7.9% of the population of Artesia in the 2010 Census.

Proposals have often been made to designate a portion of the city as "Little India" (along the lines of Little Saigon in nearby Westminster and Garden Grove). Another proposal has been for a "Little India" sign at the Pioneer Boulevard exit off of the Artesia Freeway. Opposition, primarily from other ethnicities in the city, has so far balked such plans.

According to the Los Angeles Times article "Artesia Thinks the World of Itself," four of five City Council members were outraged at Assemblyman Rudy Bermudez's attempt to make the designation without consulting the local council. The council members won a bill requiring local approval of proposed freeway sign designations. Mayor Larry Nelson said that Indian Americans constituted less than 1% of the city's population and that East Asian markets outnumber Indian ones 3 to 1. Thus, the name is the "International and Cultural Shopping District."

== Geography ==
Artesia is located at 33°52′2″N 118°4′50″W (33.867215, -118.080622).

According to the United States Census Bureau, the city has a total area of 1.6 square miles (4.1 km^{2}), all land.

== Demographics ==
Historical population
Census	Pop.	Note	%±
1950	3,223		—
1960	9,993		210.1%
1970	14,757		47.7%
1980	14,301		−3.1%
1990	15,464		8.1%
2000	16,380		5.9%
2010	16,522		0.9%
2020	16,395		−0.8%
U.S. Decennial Census; 1860–1870 1880-1890; 1900 1910 1920; 1930 1940 1950; 1960 1970 1980; 1990 2000 2010; 2020

Artesia first appeared as a city in the 1960 U.S. census as part of the Downey-Norwalk census county division.

=== Racial and ethnic composition ===
Artesia city, California – Racial and ethnic composition Note: the US Census treats Hispanic/Latino as an ethnic category. This table excludes Latinos from the racial categories and assigns them to a separate category. Hispanics/Latinos may be of any race.
Race / Ethnicity (NH = Non-Hispanic)	Pop 1980	Pop 1990	Pop 2000	Pop 2010	Pop 2020	% 1980	% 1990	% 2000	% 2010	% 2020
White alone (NH)	8,477	6,415	4,463	3,518	2,608	59.28%	41.48%	27.25%	21.29%	15.91%
Black or African American alone (NH)	143	379	550	543	627	1.00%	2.45%	3.36%	3.29%	3.82%
Native American or Alaska Native alone (NH)	80	49	62	36	26	0.56%	0.32%	0.38%	0.22%	0.16%
Asian alone (NH)	608	2,382	4,460	6,092	6,852	4.25%	15.40%	27.23%	36.87%	41.79%
Native Hawaiian or Pacific Islander alone (NH)	608	2,382	70	37	58	4.25%	15.40%	0.43%	0.22%	0.35%
Other race alone (NH)	34	45	33	76	65	0.24%	0.29%	0.20%	0.46%	0.40%
Mixed race or Multiracial (NH)	x	x	470	310	334	x	x	2.87%	1.88%	2.04%
Hispanic or Latino (any race)	4,959	6,194	6,272	5,910	5,825	34.68%	40.05%	38.29%	35.77%	35.53%
Total	14,301	15,464	16,380	16,522	16,395	100.00%	100.00%	100.00%	100.00%	100.00%

=== 2020 census ===
As of the 2020 census, Artesia had a population of 16,395 and a population density of 10,120.4 inhabitants per square mile (3,907.5/km^{2}). The median age was 40.7 years. 18.9% of residents were under the age of 18 and 18.1% were 65 years of age or older. For every 100 females, there were 99.1 males, and for every 100 females age 18 and over there were 97.5 males.

The census reported that 96.3% of the population lived in households, 0.7% lived in non-institutionalized group quarters, and 3.0% were institutionalized. 100.0% of residents lived in urban areas, while 0.0% lived in rural areas.

There were 4,600 households in Artesia, of which 38.5% had children under the age of 18 living in them. Of all households, 55.0% were married-couple households, 4.3% were cohabiting couple households, 16.2% had a male householder with no spouse or partner present, and 24.5% had a female householder with no spouse or partner present. About 14.2% of all households were made up of individuals, and 7.4% had someone living alone who was 65 years of age or older. The average household size was 3.43, and there were 3,715 families (80.8% of households).

There were 4,745 housing units at an average density of 2,929.0 units per square mile (1,130.9 units/km^{2}), of which 4,600 (96.9%) were occupied. Of the occupied units, 52.4% were owner-occupied and 47.6% were occupied by renters. 3.1% of housing units were vacant; the homeowner vacancy rate was 0.7% and the rental vacancy rate was 2.3%.

=== 2023 ACS estimates ===
In 2023, the US Census Bureau estimated that 49.4% of the population were foreign-born. Of all people aged 5 or older, 32.9% spoke only English at home, 25.5% spoke Spanish, 19.6% spoke other Indo-European languages, and 22.1% spoke Asian or Pacific Islander languages. Of those aged 25 or older, 77.2% were high school graduates and 31.8% had a bachelor's degree.

The median household income in 2023 was $97,712, and the per capita income was $31,357. About 6.0% of families and 8.9% of the population were below the poverty line.

=== 2010 census ===
At the 2010 census Artesia had a population of 16,522. The population density was 10,194.7 inhabitants per square mile (3,936.2/km^{2}). The racial makeup of Artesia was 6,446 (39.0%) White (21.3% Non-Hispanic White), 589 (3.6%) African American, 94 (0.6%) Native American, 6,131 (37.1%) Asian, 40 (0.2%) Pacific Islander, 2,630 (15.9%) from other races, and 592 (3.6%) from two or more races. Hispanic or Latino of any race were 5,910 persons (35.8%).

The census reported that 15,909 people (96.3% of the population) lived in households, 69 (0.4%) lived in non-institutionalized group quarters, and 544 (3.3%) were institutionalized.

There were 4,535 households, 1,933 (42.6%) had children under the age of 18 living in them, 2,673 (58.9%) were opposite-sex married couples living together, 670 (14.8%) had a female householder with no husband present, 334 (7.4%) had a male householder with no wife present. There were 150 (3.3%) unmarried opposite-sex partnerships, and 30 (0.7%) same-sex married couples or partnerships. 661 households (14.6%) were one person and 306 (6.7%) had someone living alone who was 65 or older. The average household size was 3.51. There were 3,677 families (81.1% of households); the average family size was 3.80.

The age distribution was 3,719 people (22.5%) under the age of 18, 1,680 people (10.2%) aged 18 to 24, 4,421 people (26.8%) aged 25 to 44, 4,454 people (27.0%) aged 45 to 64, and 2,248 people (13.6%) who were 65 or older. The median age was 38.2 years. For every 100 females, there were 98.4 males. For every 100 females age 18 and over, there were 96.1 males.

There were 4,697 housing units at an average density of 2,898.2 per square mile, of the occupied units 2,523 (55.6%) were owner-occupied and 2,012 (44.4%) were rented. The homeowner vacancy rate was 0.7%; the rental vacancy rate was 3.7%. 8,930 people (54.0% of the population) lived in owner-occupied housing units and 6,979 people (42.2%) lived in rental housing units.

According to the 2010 United States Census, Artesia had a median household income of $59,845, with 13.5% of the population living below the federal poverty line.

=== Ancestry and ethnicity ===
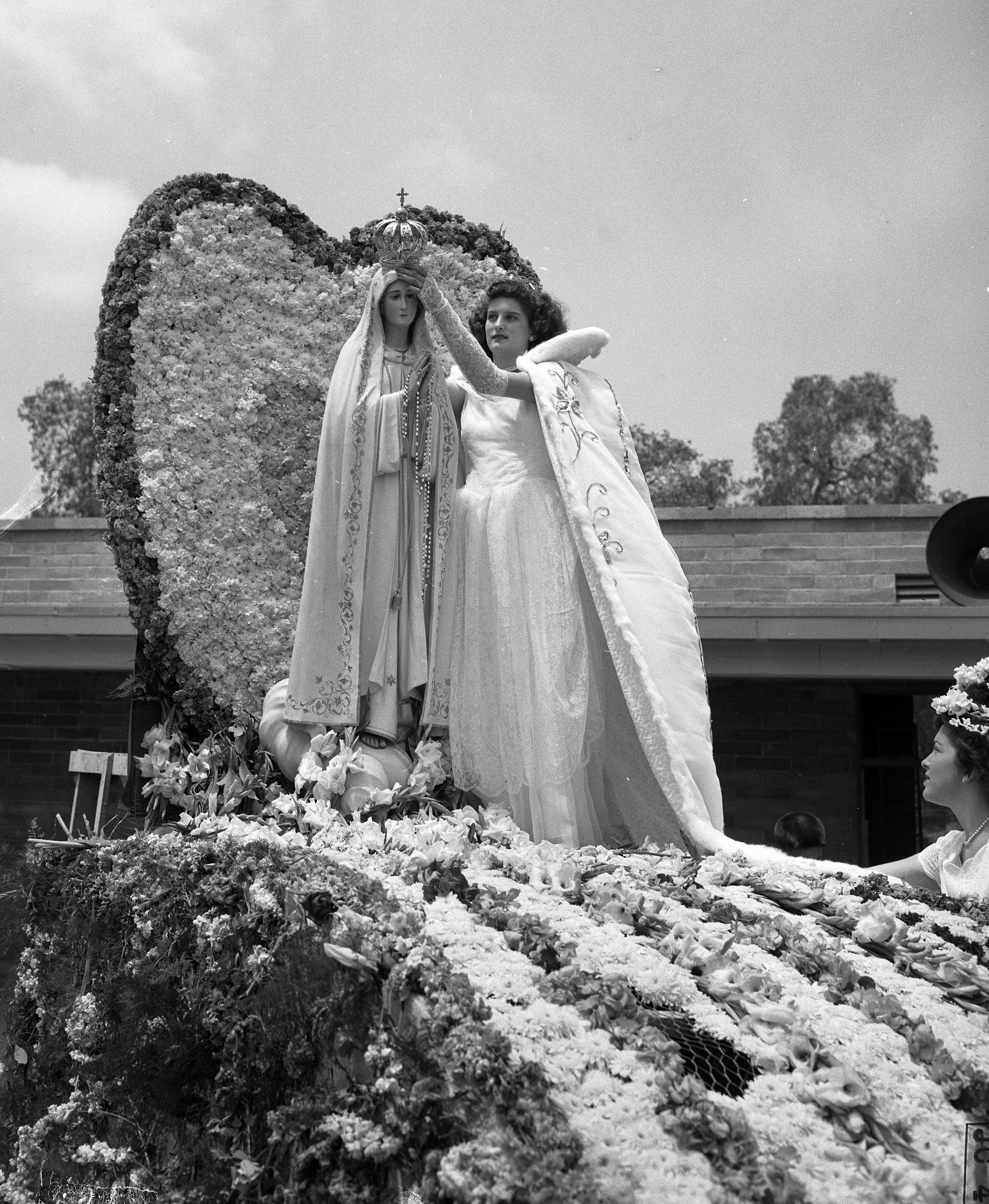
Traditional Portuguese festival at Artesia, 1948

45.8% of the residents of Artesia are foreign-born, and 25.3% are not US citizens.

For Europeans, 9.4% of Artesia is of Portuguese ancestry, with 49.4% of those foreign-born. Dutch is the second most commonly reported European ancestry at 4.6%.

27.4% of Artesia is of Asian ancestry. The most commonly reported ancestries are Filipino 10.4%, Chinese 5.1%, Indian 4.6%, and Korean 4.5%.

3.6% of Artesia is Black or African American.

38.3% of Artesia is Hispanic or Latino, with most of those being of Mexican descent (32.4%).

According to Mapping L.A., Mexican and Filipino were the most common ancestries in 2000. Mexico and the Philippines were the most common foreign places of birth.

== Government ==
=== Local Government ===
==== City Council ====
The City Council is composed of five members elected at large by the citizens of Artesia to serve for four-year overlapping terms. The City Council is responsible to the residents of Artesia for the implementation of all programs and services provided by the city.

Current City Council Members
Position	Name	Term Expiry
Mayor	Ali Sajjad Taj	2026
Mayor Pro Tem	Rene Trevino	2026
Councilmember	Monica Manalo	2028
Councilmember	Zeel Ahir	2028
Councilmember	Melissa Ramoso	2026

==== City Council Meetings ====
The regular meetings of the Artesia City Council are held on the second Monday of each month beginning at 7:00 p.m. at Artesia City Hall, Council Chambers, 18747 Clarkdale Ave. Artesia, CA 90701.

==== Commissions ====
There are four commissions serving the City of Artesia, composed of five individuals who serve voluntarily. Each member of the City Council appoints one person to each commission for a term of four years.

==== Disaster Council ====
The Disaster Council is an advisory body to the City Council which provides policies and suggestions to the City Council to adopt for emergency circumstances like earthquakes, fires, flooding, or terrorist attack.

=== State and Federal Representation ===
In the California State Legislature, Artesia is in the 36th senatorial district, represented by Republican Tony Strickland, and in the 67th Assembly district, represented by Democrat Sharon Quirk-Silva.

In the United States House of Representatives, Artesia is in California's 45th congressional district, represented by Democrat Derek Tran.

== Education ==
Artesia residents are served by the ABC Unified School District.

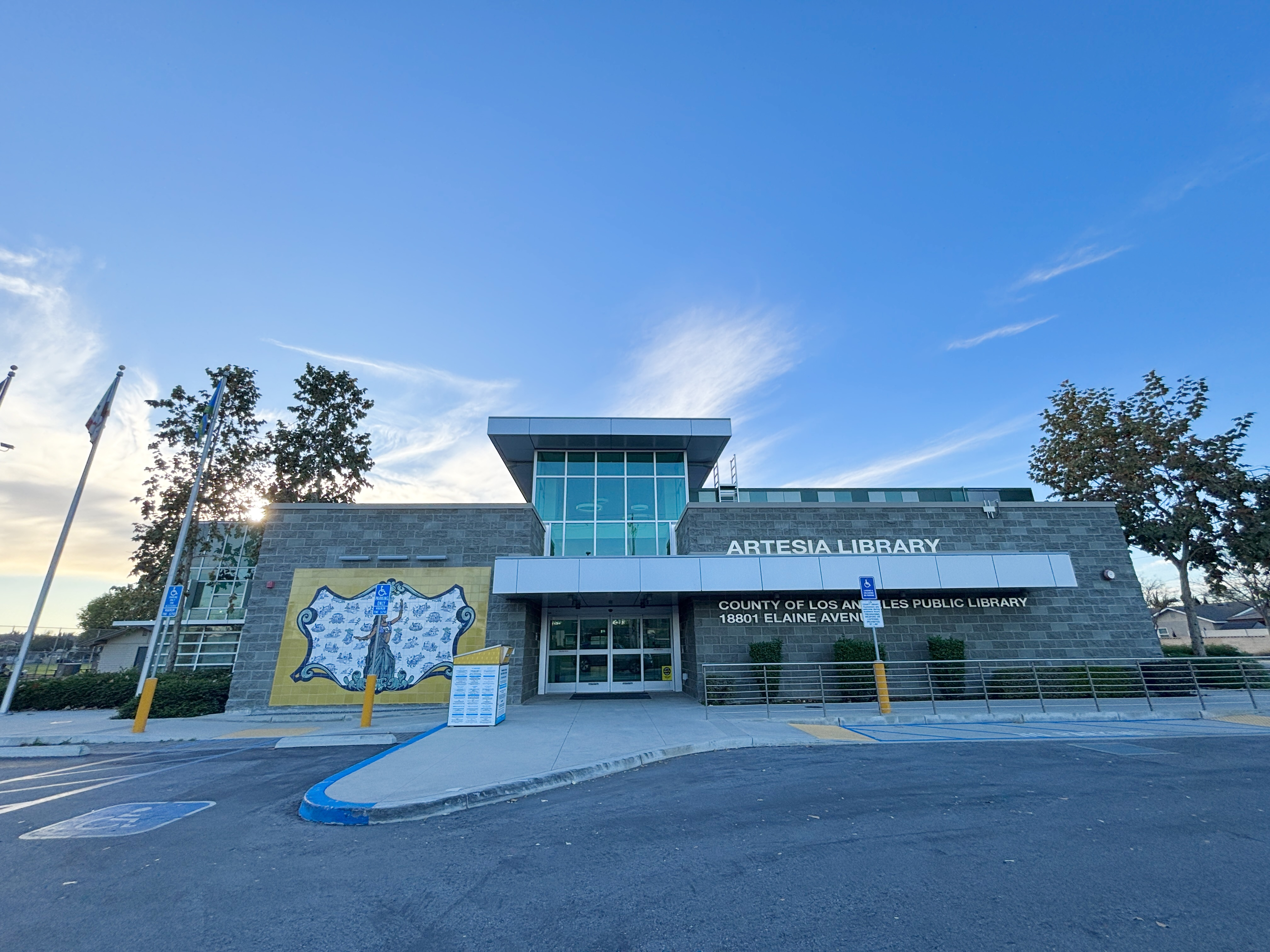
Artesia branch, County of Los Angeles Public Library

== Infrastructure ==
Fire protection in Artesia is provided by the Los Angeles County Fire Department with ambulance transport by Care Ambulance Service.

The Los Angeles County Sheriff's Department operates the Lakewood Station in Lakewood, serving Artesia.

The Los Angeles County Department of Health Services operates the Whittier Health Center in Whittier, serving Artesia.

The United States Postal Service Artesia Post Office is located at 11721 183rd Street. Los Cerritos Community News serves the city; it was previously served by the Artesia News from 1944 to 1975. The LA County Library operates a branch in Artesia, in a 5,151 ft (1,570 m) building built in 1963.

== Notable people ==
- William Yancey Brown (born 1948), zoologist
- Patrick Christopher (born 1988), basketball player
- Kimberly Duran (born 1989), Chicana muralist
- Steve Genter (born 1951), competitive swimmer and Olympian
- Dave Marshall (1943–2019), baseball player
- Kris Medlen (born 1985), baseball player
- Tony Mendoza (born 1971), member of the California State Senate
- Dan Murphy (born 1964), baseball player
- Tom Nieto (born 1960), baseball player
- John Clinton Porter (1871–1959), 33rd Mayor of Los Angeles (1929–1933)
- Alex Roldán (born 1996), soccer player
- Cristian Roldan (born 1995), soccer player
- Fred Romkema (born 1947), member of the South Dakota House of Representatives
- Charles E. Sebastian (1873–1929), 30th Mayor of Los Angeles (1915–1916)
- Travis Scott (born 1979), football player
- Rich Severson (1945–2016), baseball player
- Eddie Soto (born 1972), soccer player
- Shawna Trpcic (1966–2023), costume designer

== Sister cities ==
- Koudekerk aan den Rijn, Netherlands
