= Jerry Apa =

American politician

Member of the South Dakota Senate from the 31st district
- In office 2001–2008

Member of the South Dakota House of Representatives from the 31st district
- In office 1997–2000

Personal details
- Born: August 18, 1940 (age 85) Scottsbluff, Nebraska
- Party: Republican
- Spouse: MartyAnn Ferrero
- Profession: businessman

Gerald F. Apa (born August 18, 1940) is an American former politician. He served in the South Dakota House of Representatives from 1997 to 2000, in the South Dakota State Senate from 2001 to 2008, and as mayor of Lead, South Dakota from 2014-2016.

== Career ==
Apa was County Commissioner for Lawrence County, South Dakota from 1977-1986 and 1993-1996. He was a member of the South Dakota House of Representatives from 1997-2000 and of the South Dakota State Senate from 2001-2008. In the House he served on the Local Government, Taxation, and Transportation Committees. In the Senate he served on the Approriations Committee, serving six years as chair of the committee. After serving in state politics, he lived in Lead, South Dakota and became a leader in local civic organizations. He became mayor of Lead in 2014, serving until 2016.
