= Tom Hills =

American politician

Member of the South Dakota House of Representatives from the 31st district
- In office 2005–2008

Personal details
- Born: February 10, 1939 (age 87) Oacoma, South Dakota
- Party: Republican
- Children: two
- Education: Black Hills State University; University of Oregon
- Profession: academic, professor

Thomas R. Hills (born February 10, 1939) is an American former politician. He has served as a Republican member for the 31st district in the South Dakota House of Representatives from 2005 to 2008.
