= Charles Turbiville =

American politician

Member of the South Dakota House of Representatives from the 31st district
- In office 2017 – October 20, 2018
- In office 2005–2013

Personal details
- Born: Charles Michael Turbiville; July 13, 1943 Buffalo, South Dakota, U.S.
- Died: October 20, 2018 (aged 75) Deadwood, South Dakota, U.S.
- Party: Republican
- Children: 3
- Nickname: Chuck

Military service
- Allegiance: United States
- Branch/service: United States Army
- Years of service: 1967-1969
- Rank: First Lieutenant
- Battles/wars: Vietnam War
- Awards: Silver Star (2); Bronze Star

Charles M. Turbiville (July 13, 1943 – October 20, 2018) was an American politician, Vietnam combat veteran and member of the South Dakota House of Representatives from 2005-2013 and 2017-2018, as well as the mayor of Deadwood, South Dakota.

== Background ==
Turbiville was born in Buffalo, South Dakota. He graduated from Newell High School in Newell, South Dakota. Turbiville attended the University of South Dakota and Black Hills State University. Turbiville served in the United States Army from 1967 to 1969 and was a commissioned a second lieutenant. He was honorably discharged as a first lieutenant after having received two Silver Stars and a Bronze Star for his actions in Vietnam. He was a farmer and owned his parents farm in Newell, South Dakota. He served on the Newell School Board. Turbiville served as director of economic development for Deadwood, South Dakota. From 2013 to 2016, Turbiville served on the South Dakota Lottery Commission.

== Political career ==
Turbiville served as mayor of Deadwood, South Dakota from 2013 until his death. He also served as a Republican member for the 31st district in the South Dakota House of Representatives from 2005 to 2013, and again starting from 2017 until his death on October 20, 2018. He died at his home in Deadwood, South Dakota. He was reelected to his state house seat on November 6, two and a half weeks after his death. Governor-elect Kristi Noem appointed Dayle Hammock to fill his vacancy.

Turbiville was interred at Black Hills National Cemetery.
