= Dennis Walter Hickey =

American Catholic bishop (1914-1999)

Most Reverend Dennis W. Hickey
- Auxiliary Bishop of Rochester
- Church: Catholic Church
- See: Titular See of Rusuccuru
- Appointed: January 5, 1968
- In office: March 14, 1968 - January 16, 1990

Orders
- Ordination: June 7, 1941 by James E. Kearney
- Consecration: March 14, 1968 by Luigi Raimondi

Personal details
- Born: October 28, 1914 Dansville, New York
- Died: October 6, 1999 (aged 84) Rochester, New York

Dennis Walter Hickey (October 28, 1914 – October 6, 1999) was a Bishop of the Catholic Church in the United States. He served as an auxiliary bishop of the Diocese of Rochester from 1968 to 1990.

== Biography ==
Born in Dansville, New York, Dennis Hickey was ordained a priest for the Diocese of Rochester on June 7, 1941, by Bishop James E. Kearney.

On January 5, 1968 Pope Paul VI appointed him as the Titular Bishop of Rusuccuru and Auxiliary Bishop of Rochester. He was consecrated bishop by Archbishop Luigi Raimondi, the Apostolic Delegate to the United States, on March 14, 1968. The principal co-consecrators were Rochester Bishop Fulton J. Sheen and Bishop Emeritus James E. Kearney.

Hickey served as an auxiliary bishop until his resignation was accepted by Pope John Paul II on January 16, 1990. He died on October 6, 1999, at the age of 84.

Catholic Church titles
Preceded by –	Auxiliary Bishop of Rochester; 1968–1990	Succeeded by –
