= John Edgar McCafferty =

Most Reverend John E. McCafferty
- Auxiliary Bishop of Rochester
- Church: Catholic Church
- See: Titular See of Tanudaia
- Appointed: January 5, 1968
- In office: June 14, 1968 - April 30, 1980 (died in office)

Orders
- Ordination: March 17, 1945
- Consecration: March 14, 1968 by Luigi Raimondi

Personal details
- Born: January 6, 1920 New York, New York
- Died: April 30, 1980 (aged 60) Rochester, New York

John Edgar McCafferty (January 6, 1920 – April 30, 1980) was a Bishop of the Catholic Church in the United States. He served as an auxiliary bishop of the Diocese of Rochester from 1968 to 1980.

== Biography ==
Born in New York City, John McCafferty was ordained a priest for the Diocese of Rochester on March 17, 1945.

On January 5, 1968 Pope Paul VI appointed him as the Titular Bishop of Tanudaia and Auxiliary Bishop of Rochester. He was consecrated bishop by Archbishop Luigi Raimondi, the Apostolic Delegate to the United States, on June 14, 1968. The principal co-consecrators were Rochester Bishop Fulton J. Sheen and Bishop Emeritus James E. Kearney.

McCafferty served as an auxiliary bishop until his death on April 30, 1980, at the age of 60.

Catholic Church titles
Preceded by –	Auxiliary Bishop of Rochester; 1968–1980	Succeeded by –
