= Joseph Lloyd Hogan =

American Catholic bishop (1916–2000)

His Excellency, The Most Reverend Joseph Lloyd Hogan
- Bishop of Rochester
- Diocese: Diocese of Rochester
- In office: November 28, 1969 – November 22, 1978
- Predecessor: Fulton J. Sheen
- Successor: Matthew H. Clark

Orders
- Ordination: June 6, 1942 by James Edward Kearney
- Consecration: November 28, 1969 by Luigi Raimondi

Personal details
- Born: March 11, 1916 Lima, New York, U.S.
- Died: August 27, 2000 (aged 84) New York City, U.S.
- Denomination: Roman Catholic
- Education: St. Bernard's Seminary; Canisius College; Pontifical University of Saint Thomas Aquinas

Joseph Lloyd Hogan (March 11, 1916 – August 27, 2000) was an American prelate of the Roman Catholic Church. He served as the seventh bishop of the Diocese of Rochester in New York from 1969 to 1978.

== Biography ==
=== Early life ===
Hogan was born on March 11, 1916, in Lima, New York. He attended St. Andrew's Seminary and St. Bernard's Seminary in Rochester. He was ordained to the priesthood in Rochester, New York, by Bishop James Edward Kearney for the Diocese of Rochester on June 6, 1942. Hogan received a master's degree from Canisius College in Buffalo. In 1949, Hogan received a Doctor of Sacred Theology degree from the Pontifical University of Saint Thomas Aquinas in Rome.

Hogan served on the faculty of St. Bernard's Seminary, as rector at Becket Hall residence for the diocesan seminary at St John Fisher College and Sisters of St. Joseph Novitiate, both in Pittsford, New York. From 1953 to 1955, he served as the fifth principal of DeSales High School in Geneva, New York. He was appointed monsignor in 1966, and served as pastor of St. Margaret Mary Parish in Irondequoit, New York, until being appointed bishop.

=== Bishop of Rochester ===
On October 6, 1969, Hogan was appointed bishop of Rochester by Pope Paul VI. He was consecrated on November 28, 1969, in Rochester by Cardinal Luigi Raimondi.

Hogan's resignation as bishop of Rochester was accepted by Pope John Paul II on November 22, 1978. Joseph Hogan died in New York City on August 27, 2000.

Catholic Church titles
Preceded by Fulton J. Sheen	Bishop of Rochester, New York; 1969–1978	Succeeded by Matthew H. Clark
