= St. Francis Xavier's Church (Bronx) =

Roman Catholic church in the Bronx, New York, United States

Coordinates: 40°50′53″N 73°51′10″W

St. Francis Xavier Church, Bronx
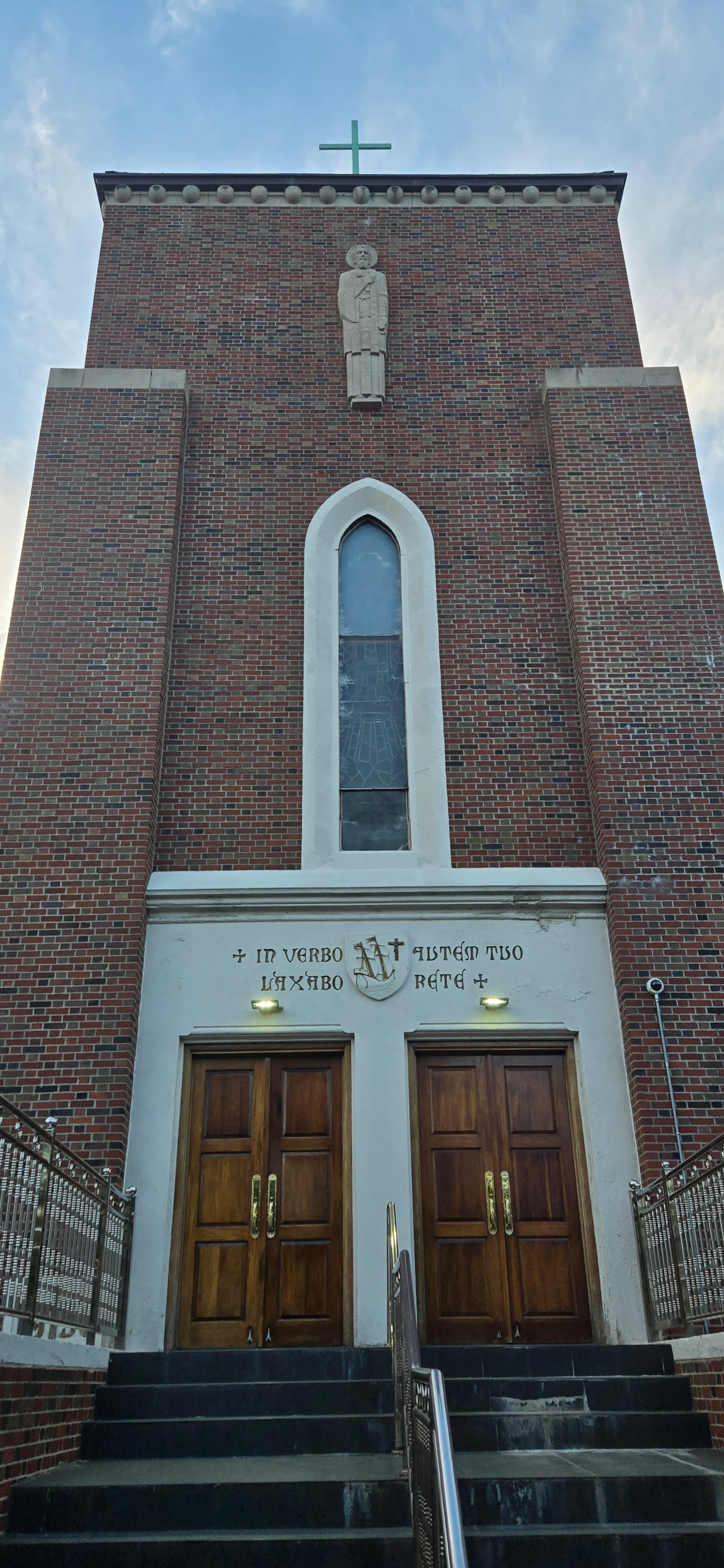
- Entrance to the church
- Interactive map of the St. Francis Xavier Church, Bronx area

General information
- Architectural style: Gothic Revival
- Location: Morris Park, Bronx, New York City, USA
- Construction started: 1937 (for school); 1955 (school annex)
- Completed: 1951 (for church);
- Client: Roman Catholic Archdiocese of New York

Technical details
- Structural system: Red brick masonry

The Church of St. Francis Xavier is a Roman Catholic parish church in the Archdiocese of New York, located at 1703 Lurting Avenue, Morris Park, in the Bronx. The parish has a church and school, both of which were founded by the Rev. James Edward Kearney (1884–1977), later the Bishop of Salt Lake City and Bishop of Rochester.

== Parish ==
The parish was established in 1928 and dedicated in honor of St. Francis Xavier (1506–1552), the Spanish-born Jesuit missionary to India and Japan, who died en route to China. The first pastor was the Rev. James Edward Kearney (1884–1977), who served St. Francis Xavier from 1928 until 1932, when he became Bishop of Salt Lake City. He later was to become Bishop of Rochester. John M. J. Quinn (1886–1955) was pastor from 1951 until his death in 1955, and headed a Catholic War Veterans organization.

Fr. Kearney had been influential spreading Catholicism in the Bronx, founding this parish first "using two portable structures as a temporary church and auditorium." During his pastorate, he also served as professor of religion at Good Counsel College in White Plains and as superintendent of parochial schools in the Bronx. In 2016 the traditional Corpus Christi procession was being held after Sunday Mass of this feast in June, under Frs. Robert Verrigni pastor and Matthew Reiman parochial vicar.

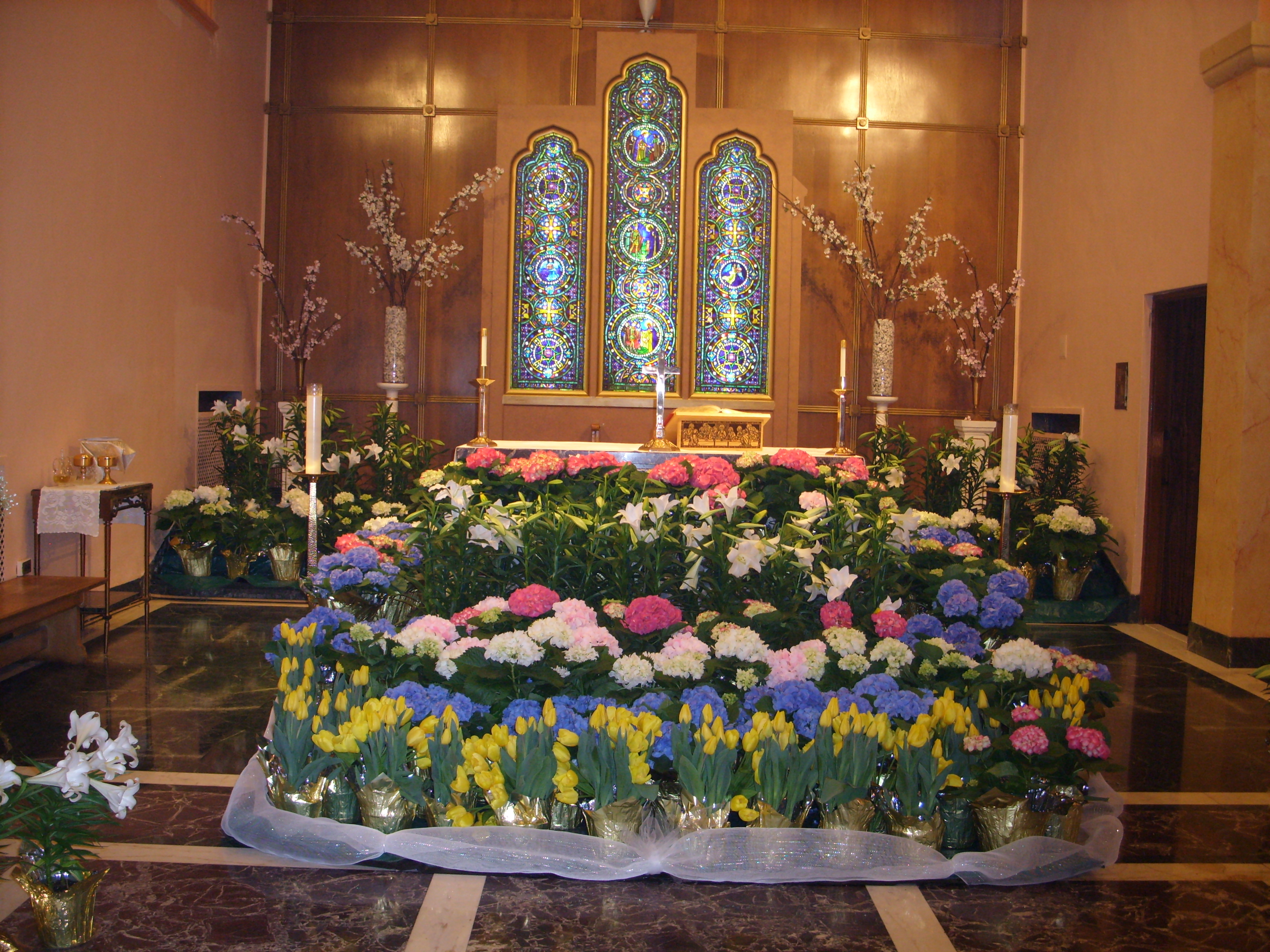
St. Francis Xavier's Altar on Easter Sunday 2016

== Buildings ==
In 1951, a new building was erected at 1658 Lurting Avenue, at the intersection of Van Nest Avenue, in the Morris Park section of the Bronx. Cardinal Spellman blessed and re-dedicated the church building with more than 1000 people attending the ceremony. The architecture of the church is very monumental for its neighborhood, if a bit retrograde for its post-ward period of design. However, in contrast to the post-war Modernist brick box churches of this period, St. Francis Xavier's Church is designed in an early Gothic style with pointed arched windows and entrances accentuating a stolid masonry mass of low gabled nave and hipped square tower. in leafy and manicured lawned surroundings. The architecture is in the style of thirteenth-century Italian Gothic. The general red brick masonry of the walls is elegantly trimmed with white limestone, as is the corbelled tower cornice, which match the white masonry statues above the principal entrance gable and on the tower upper stage side elevations.

"The parish has several substantial buildings, including what appear to be two schools. A convent was refurbished for the Franciscan sisters sponsored by Fr. Benedict Groeschel." The address for the rectory is 1703 Lurting Avenue. The convent was likely originally built for the Sisters of Mercy. The eleven-bay, two-storey-over-raised-basement brick school with Romanesque design accents was built in 1937 and extended in 1955. The structure has a prominent, broad-hipped slate roof with an ornamental louvre surmounted by a copper-clad Latin cross. Despite varying dates, all the complex structures appear to have been built in harmonious styles with a brick color that matches the vernacular neighborhood architecture.

== St. Francis Xavier School ==
The parish school was located at 1711 Haight Avenue and had students from New Beginnings to Eighth Grade. Following the parish's founding in 1928, Fr. Kearney founded the school in 1929, which was initially housed in the "portable" (temporary) auditorium building. The school first opened on September 15, 1930; the first principal was Miss Helen Kelly. Ground was broken for a permanent, eight-classroom school building on April 11, 1937, which was then staffed by the Sisters of Mercy. St. Francis Xavier School merged with the sister school, St. Clare of Assisi School, after the 2022-2023 school year to form the St. Clare of Assisi-St. Francis Xavier School.

== Music ==
The organ at St. Francis Xavier Church was designed in 1951 by the Kilgen Organ Company, successor firm to Geo. Kilgen & Sons of St. Louis, Mo. Kilgen's Opus 7529 for St. Francis Xavier has 2 manuals, 18 stops, and 16 ranks.

== Pastors ==
- 1928-1932: Rev. James Edward Kearney (1884–1977)
- 1932-1955: Rt. Rev. John M. J. Quinn (1886–1955)
- 1955-1972: Rt. Rev. Joseph Doyle (1897-1984)
- 1972-1977: Rt. Rev. G. Howard Moore (1913-1977)
- 1977-1985: Rev. John Reardon
- 1985-1988: Rev. Christopher O'Connor
- 1988-1992: Rev. Bartholomew Daly
- 1992-1998: Rev. Joseph Hickey
- 1998-2008: Rev. Arthur Welton
- 2008-2016: Rev. Matthew Furey
- 2016-2017: Rev. Robert Verrigni
- 2017- : Rev. Salvatore DeStefano
