= Matthew H. Clark =

American prelate of the Catholic Church (1937–2023)

His Excellency, The Most Reverend Matthew Harvey Clark
- Bishop of Rochester
- Church: Catholic Church; Latin Church
- Province: New York
- Diocese: Rochester, NY
- Appointed: April 23, 1979
- Installed: June 26, 1979
- Term ended: September 21, 2012
- Predecessor: Joseph Lloyd Hogan
- Successor: Salvatore Ronald Matano

Orders
- Ordination: December 19, 1962 by Martin John O’Connor
- Consecration: May 27, 1979 by John Paul II, Duraisamy Simon Lourdusamy, Eduardo Martínez Somalo

Personal details
- Born: July 15, 1937 Waterford, New York, U.S.
- Died: January 22, 2023 (aged 85) Pittsford, New York, US
- Education: College of the Holy Cross; Pontifical North American College; Pontifical Gregorian University
- Motto: God's love endures forever

Styles of Matthew Harvey Clark
- Reference style: His Excellency; The Most Reverend
- Spoken style: Your Excellency
- Religious style: Bishop

Matthew Harvey Clark (July 15, 1937 – January 22, 2023) was an American Catholic prelate who served as Bishop of Rochester from 1979 to 2012.

== Early life and education ==
Matthew Clark was born on July 15, 1937, in Waterford, New York, to Matthew and Grace (née Bills) Clark. He attended Catholic Central High School in Troy, New York, and the College of the Holy Cross in Worcester, Massachusetts, before entering Mater Christi Seminary in Albany, New York.

Clark also attended St. Bernard's Seminary in Rochester, New York. He then studied in Rome at the Pontifical North American College and the Pontifical Gregorian University.

== Priesthood ==
On December 19, 1962, Clark was ordained to the priesthood in Rome by Martin O'Connor in the Sacro Cuore di Cristo Re Basilica for the Diocese of Albany in New York. He obtained a Licentiate of Sacred Theology from the Gregorian University in 1963. On his return to New York, Clark served a summer assignment in the summer of 1963. as assistant pastor of St. Joseph's Church in Greenfield Center. From 1963-1964, Clark taught at the Vincentian Institute while serving as an assistant pastor at Our Lady of Mercy Parish, both in Albany. From June-September 1964, Clark was assigned to the Chancery of the Roman Catholic Diocese of Albany.

Clark returned to the Gregorian University in 1964, earning a Licentiate of Canon Law in 1966. In 1966, Clark was appointed vice-chancellor for the diocese and served in that role until 1967. Also from 1966-1967, Clark was The Newman Chaplain for Albany Law School. In 1967, Clark was the chairman of The Fairness To Children Campaign in the Diocese of Albany. In 1967, Clark was named assistant pastor at St. Ambrose Parish in Latham, New York. He was named chair of the diocesan Priests' Personnel Board in 1969.

In the summer of 1972, Clark took a course in religious counseling at Catholic University of America in Washington D.C. In September 1972, Clark went to Rome to serve as assistant spiritual director of the North American College. He became its full spiritual director in 1974.

== Bishop of Rochester ==
On April 23, 1979, Pope John Paul II appointed Clark as the eighth bishop of Rochester. He was consecrated in Rome on May 27, 1979, by John Paul II himself, with Archbishop Duraisamy Lourdusamy and Cardinal Eduardo Somalo serving as co-consecrators, at St. Peter's Basilica. Clark selected as his episcopal motto: "God's Love Endures Forever". Clark was installed as bishop at the Rochester War Memorial in Rochester, New York, on June 26, 1979.

In March 1986, Clark defended one of his priests, the theologian Charles Curran, from criticism by Vatican officials for his stands on birth control, abortion rights for women, homosexuality, and divorce. In December 1986, Cardinal Josef Ratzinger ordered Clark to withdraw his imprimatur, or church approval, from a sex education manual written by a priest in his parish. Ratzinger said the manual was "defective" on church teachings.

In 2003, Clark was criticized for his $11 million renovation of Sacred Heart Cathedral in Rochester. Clark received some credit for clamping down on abusive priests. In 2004, the diocese was deemed to be in "full compliance" with the US Conference of Catholic Bishops (USCCB) charter for the protection of children and young people. Clark presided over the unpopular closing of many of Rochester's parochial schools and parishes, pledging to complete the "re-sizing" of the diocese prior to his retirement in 2012.

=== Retirement ===
On September 21, 2012, Pope Benedict XVI accepted Clark's resignation. The pope named Bishop Robert Cunningham as apostolic administrator until the installation of the new bishop, Salvatore Matano. In September 2019, Clark revealed that he had been diagnosed with Alzheimer's disease.

In February 2020, U.S. Bankruptcy Judge Paul R. Warren ruled that Clark had to testify as part of bankruptcy proceedings for the Diocese of Rochester. Clark's lawyer had argued that his client was incapable of doing so due to Alzheimer's. In July 2020, Clark was questioned for three hours in a deposition hearing. He admitted sending Eugene Emo, a priest later convicted of sexual abuse of a minor, to a treatment facility, then reassigning him to another parish.

Clark died on January 22, 2023, in the motherhouse of the Sisters of St. Joseph in Pittsford, New York, at age 85.

Catholic Church titles
Preceded by Joseph L. Hogan	Bishop of Rochester, New York; 1979–2012	Succeeded by Salvatore R. Matano
