= WKSt.V. Unitas Stolzenfels =

German Catholic student fraternity

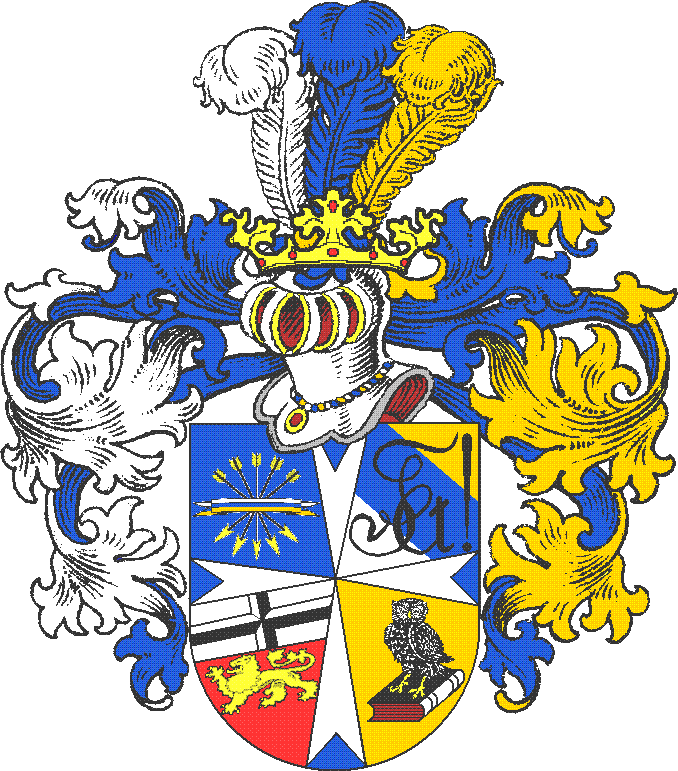
- Founded: November 28, 1910; 114 years ago University of Bonn
- Type: Studentenverbindung
- Affiliation: UV
- Status: Active
- Emphasis: Scientific Catholic
- Scope: Local
- Motto: In necessariis unitas, in dubiis libertas, in omnibus caritas
- Pillars: Virtus, Scientia, and Amicitia
- Colors: White, Blue, and Gold
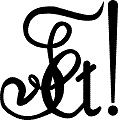
- Zirkel

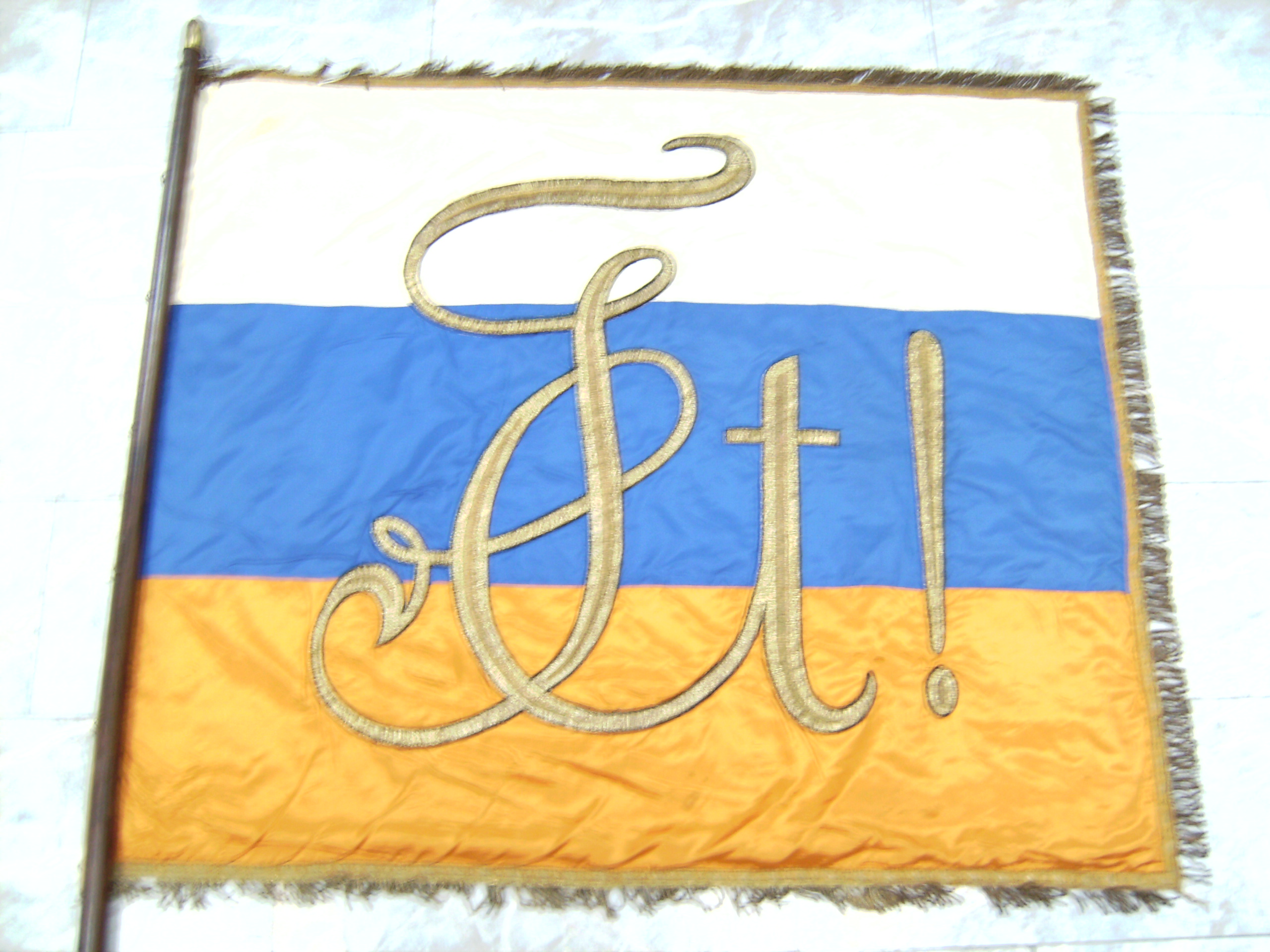
- Flag
- Chapters: 1
- Headquarters: Hatschiergasse 21; Bonn 53111; Germany

The Wissenschaftliche Katholische Studentenverein Unitas Stolzenfels is a scientific Catholic student association at the University of Bonn in Germany. It was established in 1910. It It is a member of the Unitas-Verband (UV) an umbrella organization of several German Catholic fraternities and sororities. Unitas Stolzenfels is the second oldest of the four today existing Unitas associations in Bonn.

== History ==
=== 1910–1938 ===
Unitas Stolzenfels was founded in Bonn on 28 November 1910 as Unitas Sigfridia and was associated with the Unitas-Verband on 6 June 1911 by the 52nd general assembly (Generalversammlung, GV) of the Unitas-Verband in Fulda. World War I prevented a fast buildup of the Aktivitas (the active student association). Only in the winter term of 1919/20, the fraternity was re-established.

The color crisis was a struggle among the different fraternities of the Unitas-Verband. Some associations wanted to carry colors (hats and ribbons with the colors of the fraternity). Unitas Sigfridia was one of them. Therefore, it left the umbrella association in 1924 and founded with other fraternities the RKDB (Ring Katholischer Deutscher Burschenschaften (Ring of Catholic German fraternities)).

=== 1st re-establishment ===
Together with eight other members Hermann-Josef Stumpe, religion teacher, and Dr. Karl Loskant founded Unitas Stolzenfels in 1927, which didn't want to break away from Unitas umbrella association. The name refers to the castle Stolzenfels near Koblenz, Germany. With the other Unitas associations in Bonn, Unitas Stolzenfels developed a viable confraternity. Before fraternities were banned by the national socialists, each of the associations in Bonn had 50 to 40 active members. The first house of Stolzenfels is still standing on Bonner Talweg. In 1938 Unitas Stolzenfels as the whole umbrella organisation Unitas was banned.

=== Post-war period ===
After WWII Unitas Stolzenfels was re-established in the winter term of 1949/1950. A few out-of-town members and a few members of Unitas-Salia helped. Once again Hermann-Josef Stumpe, now pastor of the Bonn minister, and bank director Dr. Karl Loskant were founding members. Official affiliation followed on 4 August 1950, during the 73rd general assembly (Generalversammlung, GV) in Munich.

In 1956 a new house had to be bought since the old house was dispossessed by the national socialists but was not given back after the war. The house and the parties held in this house will always remain a nice memory of the students of the 50s and 60s. In 1967 the house was sold to the Deutsche Bahn to finance a new house. This wasn't too good for fraternity life, since no festivities could be held in their rooms. It also wasn't possible to provide cheap housing for new students and members. In 1970 this changed at once with the opening of the new house on Hatschiergasse. There was more space for festivities and more rooms for students. The fraternity began to flourish once again. The house was inaugurated during the 95th GV in Bonn in 1972 by the nuncio in Germany, Archbishop Corrado Bafile.

Since 1963 an irregular magazine has been published by Stolzenfels called "Convent".

== Symbols and traditions ==
As a sign of membership, a needle is affixed to the collar of every new member at their official reception into the fraternity. The new member is now a "Fux". "Füxe" can look into the fraternity for one year and then decide to become a lifelong member ("Burschen") or to leave the fraternity.

The motto of W.K.St.V. Unitas Stolzenfels is In necessariis unitas, in dubiis libertas, in omnibus caritas or "In necessity unanimity, in doubt liberty, but above all charity". The principles of the society are:

- Virtus means you should always pursue a Christian way of life, which considers social engagement and willingness to fulfill our responsibility in church, nation, and society.
- Scientia requests every member of Unitas, to deal with other academic subjects than one’s own. It is a possibility to enhance one's general knowledge and to sharpen one's judgment for a better world.
- Amicitia characterizes our effort to win friends for life by friendly behavior with each other and responsibility and concern for each other.

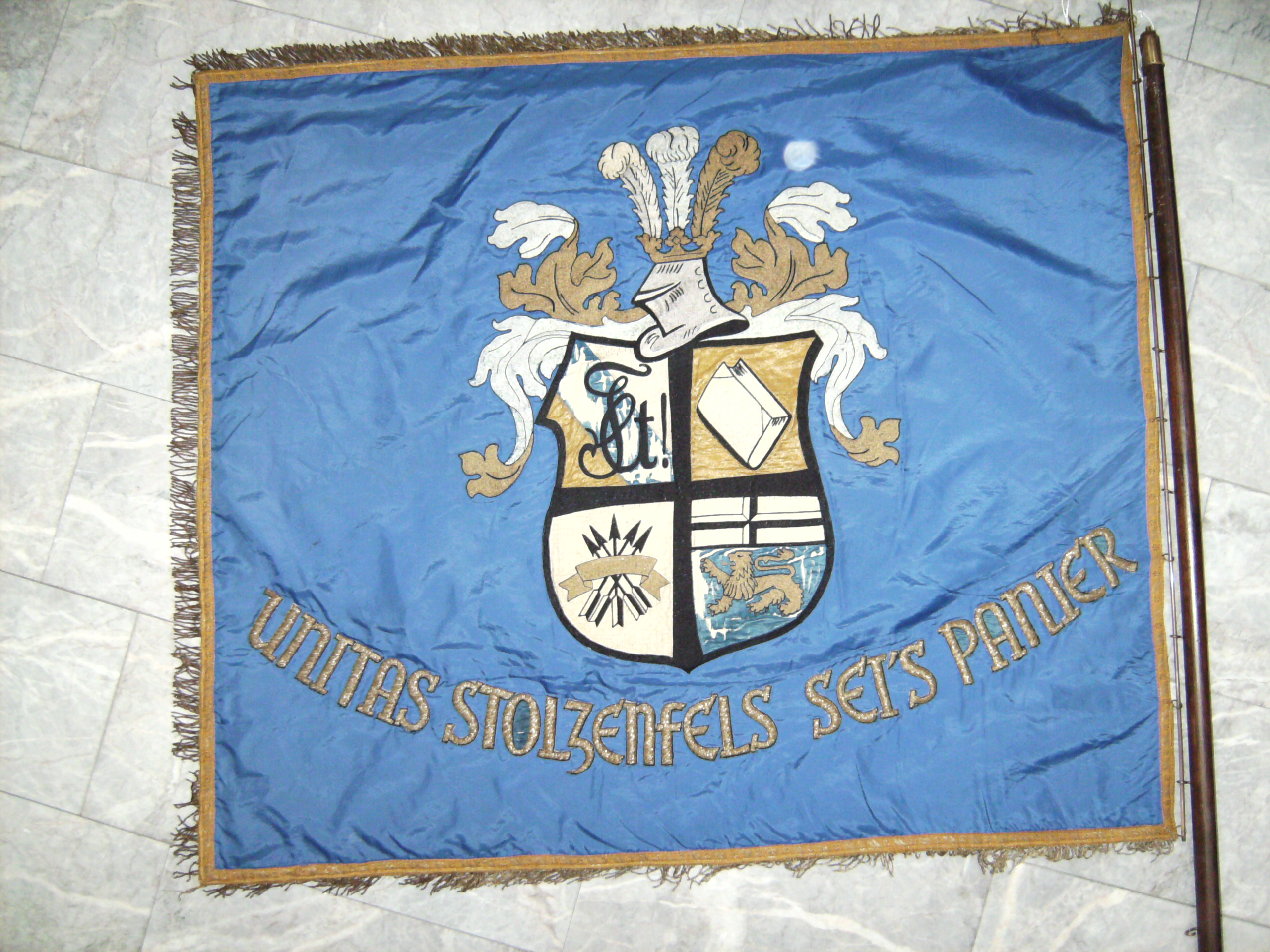
Reverse of flag, with coat of arms

The colors of Unitas Stolzenfels are the colors of the Unitas-Verband in the order of white blue gold. Its flag has the colors white-blue-gold in horizontal stripes with an embroidered monogram. On the other side, the coat of arms is depicted on a blue basis. Underneath it reads: Unitas Stolzenfels sei's panie (Flag of Unitas Stolzenfels)

The coat of arms includes four fields, showing:

- A bundle of arrows (the arrows represent Amicitia, the friendship in the fraternity meaning that the community is strong and cannot be broken like a single arrow)
- The Zirkel
- The coat of arms or the flag of the local city
- An owl (Representing Scientia, meaning science and education. Sometimes sitting on a book or completely replaced by a book. The owl also sometimes sits on top of the coat of arms.)

The monogram or zirkel of Unitas Stolzenfels contains the following letters:

Zirkel (Monogram) of Unitas Stolzenfels

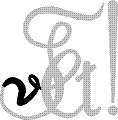
Vivat (Live)

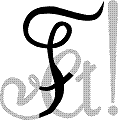
Floreat (Flourish)

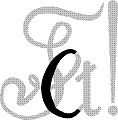
Crescat (Prosper)

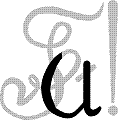
Unitas

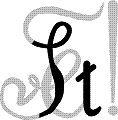
Stolzenfels

The exclamation mark shows, that this fraternity has active students. A Zirkel without an exclamation mark still exists, but has no more active students and therefore has a high possibility of ceasing to exist when the last of the Alte Herren ("Old Gentlemen", members who finished studying) dies.

== Notable members ==
- Joseph Goebbels, Reichspropagandaminister (member from 1917 until 1919)
- Maximilian Goffart, auxiliary bishop in Aachen
- Josef Höchst, member of the federal parliament in Germany
- Heinrich Krone, federal minister in Germany
