= Sacred Heart Cathedral (Rochester, New York) =

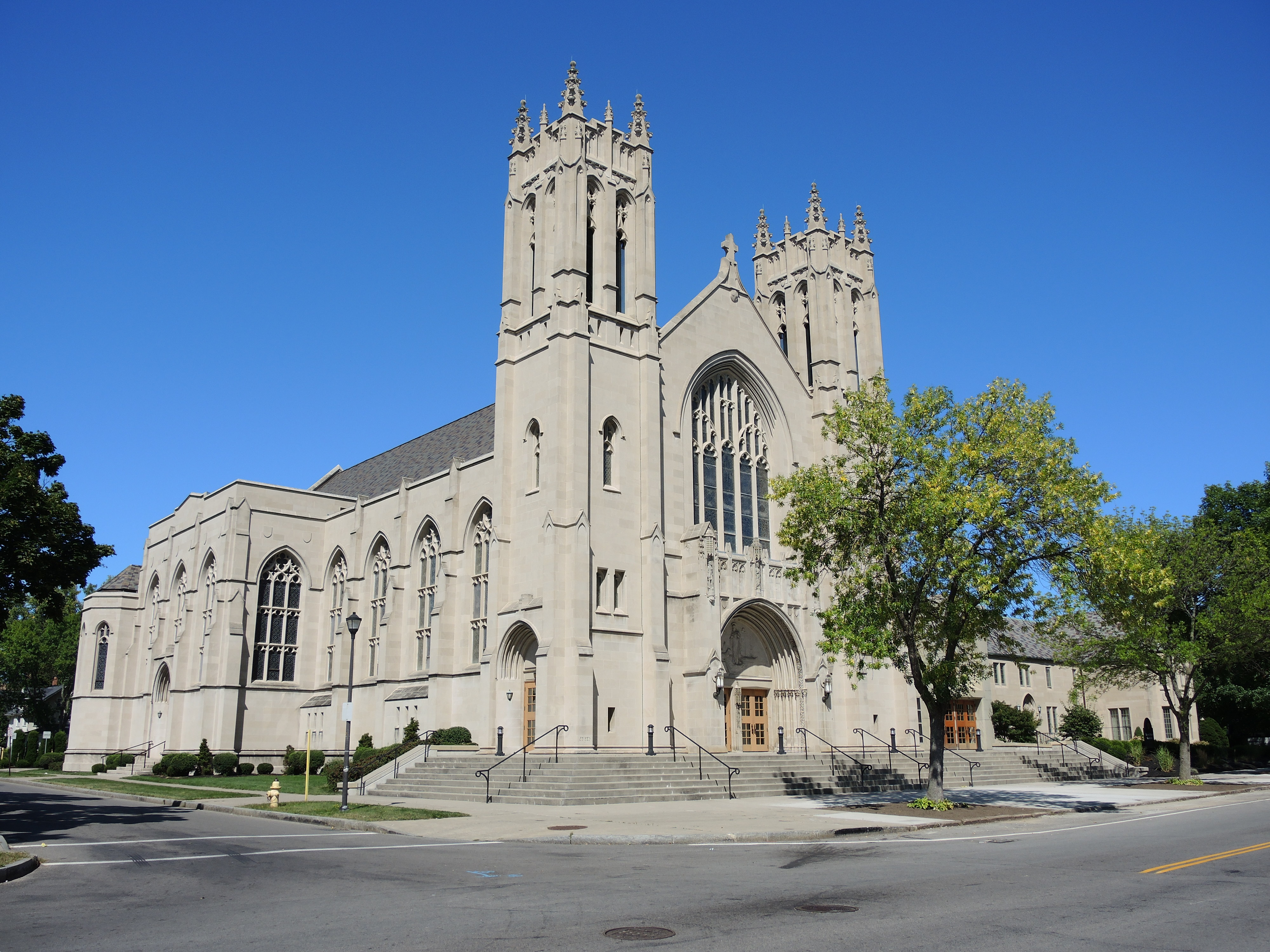
- Sacred Heart Cathedral in 2013

- Location in New York
- 43°11′35″N 77°37′58″W
- Location: 296 Flower City Park; Rochester, New York
- Country: United States
- Denomination: Roman Catholic Church
- Website: sacredheartrochester.org

History
- Founded: 1911

Architecture
- Functional status: Active
- Style: Gothic Revival
- Groundbreaking: 1925
- Completed: 1927

Specifications
- Materials: Limestone

Administration
- Diocese: Rochester
- Deanery: Monroe Central
- Parish: Cathedral Community

Clergy
- Bishop: Most Rev. John S. Bonnici
- Rector: Very Rev. Fr. Peter Van Lieshout

The Sacred Heart Cathedral is a Catholic cathedral in Rochester, New York, United States. The renovated cathedral is the Mother Church of the Diocese of Rochester and seat of the diocesan bishop, as well as home to a parish community. The parish is currently known as the Cathedral Community at The Sacred Heart Cathedral.

== History ==
In 1823, St. Patrick's was the first Catholic parish established in Rochester. Its third church building was under construction when the Diocese of Rochester was founded in 1868, and it became the diocesan cathedral. The Eastman Kodak Company built their headquarters adjacent to the cathedral property in 1914. Over the intervening years, the company expanded its footprint in the area and other parishes were established in the city. With the approval of the Holy See, the diocese sold St. Patrick's Cathedral to Eastman Kodak in 1937 and it was dismantled that same year. The parish remained in existence until 1979.

In the meantime, Sacred Heart parish was founded in 1911. The cornerstone for the present church was laid in 1925. Designed by Chicago architect Charles H. Prindeville, of the firm Egan & Prindeville, it was completed in 1927. Sacred Heart was named the pro-cathedral of the diocese when St. Patrick's was sold and became a full cathedral in 1952.

== 2005 Renovation ==
The diocese completed an extensive and controversial eighteen-month renovation of the cathedral in January 2005 at a cost of $11 million. Fr. Richard S. Vosko, a liturgical design consultant and priest of the Diocese of Albany, supervised the renovation.

Apart from structural repairs and improvements, the renovation comprised moving the altar from the front of the church to the center in order to foster a feeling of participation, removing a large statue of the Sacred Heart of Jesus hung on the wall in the sanctuary and replacing it with a new organ (the choir will now stand in the former altar space; fully visible), placing a new immersion baptismal font in the main aisle of the church so the community can share in baptisms, removing the pews and replacing them with padded chairs to allow flexible seating for events and moving the tabernacle out of the sanctuary to a side chapel.

The renovation was controversial and attempts by traditional parishioners to stop the renovations were not successful. Protestors were upset with the "radical" re-configuration deemed a "wreckovation", the unwarranted spending of substantial monies when the diocese is closing churches and schools, and the fact that the church would likely become a pilgrimage site if former Rochester bishop Fulton Sheen is canonized believing that the church should remain in the condition when he served.

== Organ ==
The organ is Opus 26 of Paul Fritts & Company, a three-manual, 53-rank instrument with mechanical key action.

== See also ==
- List of Catholic cathedrals in the United States
- List of cathedrals in the United States
