= Saint Pius X School =

Saint Pius Tenth School

Location
- 3000 Chili Avenue; Rochester, New York 14624; United States
- Coordinates: 43.1139°N 77.7342°W

Information
- Type: Parochial
- Religious affiliation: Roman Catholic
- Established: 1954
- School district: Roman Catholic Diocese of Rochester
- Principal: Maria Cahill
- Grades: K-5

Saint Pius Tenth School is in the greater Rochester, New York, area and affiliated with the Roman Catholic Diocese of Rochester. It is certified by the State of New York and accredited by the Middle States Association of Colleges and Schools. It offers programs in preschool through Grade 5.
