= John M. J. Quinn =

John M. J. Quinn (1886–1955) was a Monsignor and from 1951 to 1955 head of St. Francis Xavier's Church in the Bronx, New York, and also head of the Catholic War Veterans.

== Biography ==
Quinn was born in 1886. In 1912 he had his ordination. He became the assistant pastor at Saint Patrick's Cathedral. In 1932 Patrick Joseph Hayes made him pastor of St. Francis Xavier's. He died in 1955.
