= Corrado Bafile =

Italian cardinal (1903–2005)

His Eminence Corrado Bafile
- Prefect Emeritus of the Congregation for the Causes of Saints
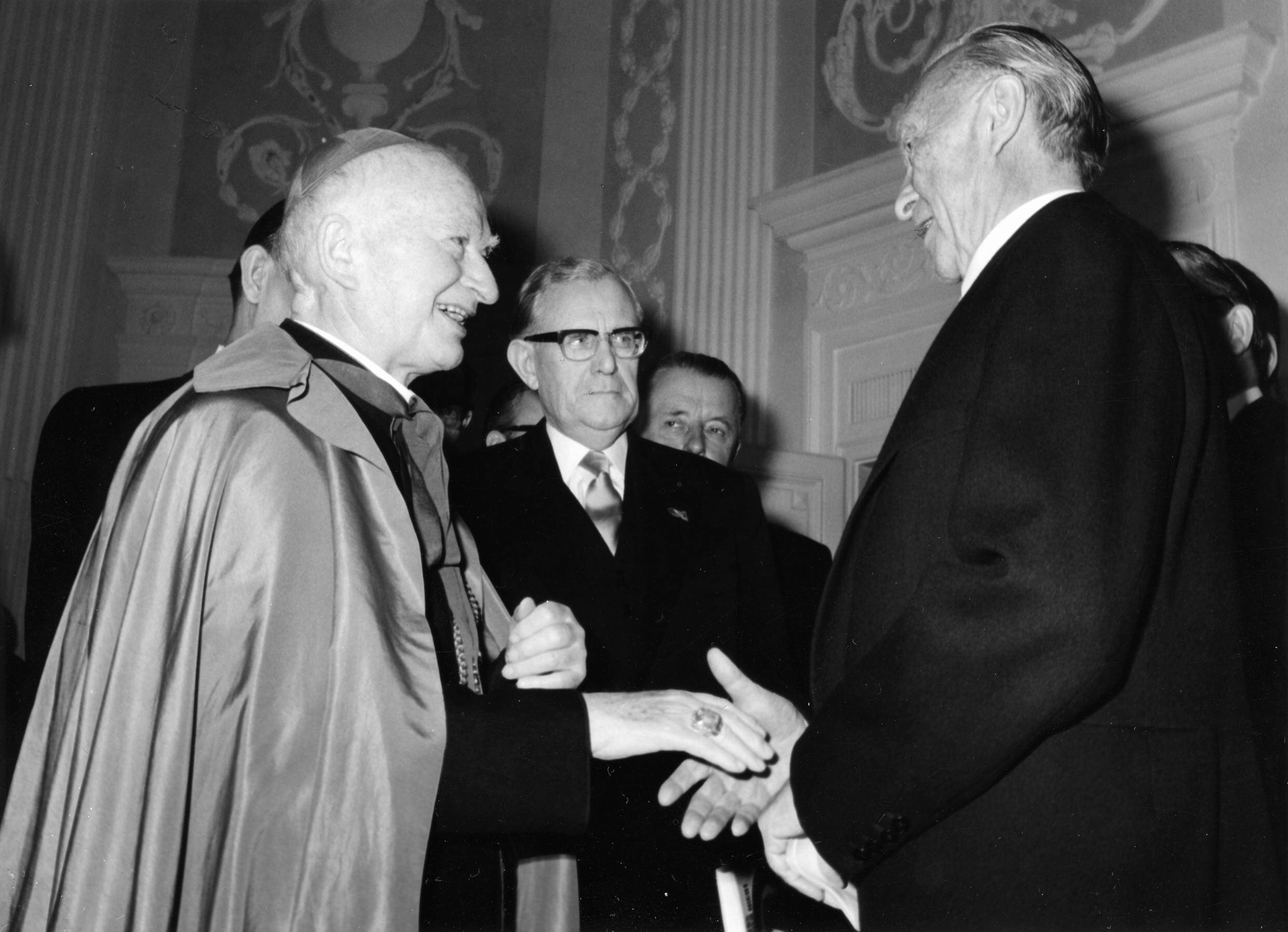
- Nuncio Bafile (l.) at the birthday celebration of Chancellor Adenauer, 1964
- Archdiocese: Antiochia in Pisidia (Titular)
- In office: 25 May 1976 – 27 June 1980
- Predecessor: Luigi Raimondi
- Successor: Pietro Palazzini
- Previous posts: Apostolic Nuncio to Germany (1960–1975); Prefect of the Congregation for the Causes of Saints (1975–1980)

Orders
- Ordination: 11 April 1936
- Consecration: 19 March 1960 by Pope John XXIII
- Created cardinal: 24 May 1976 by Pope Paul VI
- Rank: Cardinal deacon

Personal details
- Born: 4 July 1903 L'Aquila, Italy
- Died: 3 February 2005 (aged 101) Clinica Pio XI, Rome
- Buried: Saint Maria Paganica Church, L'Aquila, Italy
- Parents: Vincenzo Bafile (Father); Maddalena Tedeschini D'Annibale (Mother)
- Education: Pontifical Gregorian University; Pontifical Roman Seminary; Pontifical Lateran University; Pontifical Ecclesiastical Academy
- Motto: Obedientia et Pax (Obedience and Peace)
- Coat of arms: Corrado Bafile's coat of arms

Styles of Corrado Bafile
- Reference style: His Eminence
- Spoken style: Your Eminence
- Religious style: Cardinal
- Informal style: Cardinal

Corrado Bafile (4 July 1903 – 3 February 2005) was an Italian cardinal of the Catholic Church who served as Prefect of the Congregation for the Causes of Saints from 1975 to 1980, and was elevated to the cardinalate in 1976. At the time of his death, he was the oldest member of the College of Cardinals.

== Early life ==
The youngest of the twelve children, Bafile was born in L'Aquila, Abruzzo, to physician Vincenzo Bafile and his wife Maddalena Tedeschini D'Annibale. His brother was a military hero who died in World War I, and was posthumously awarded the Gold Medal of Military Valour. He attended the liceo classico in L'Aquila before studying chemistry at the Ludwig-Maximilians-Universität München in Germany. Following his father's death, Bafile entered the Sapienza University of Rome, from where he obtained a doctorate in law in 1926. Once he passed the examination for a legal procurator, he was registered with the Court of Appeals of L'Aquila in June 1927.

== Priesthood ==
Bafile later decided to pursue Holy Orders in 1932, and then studied philosophy at the Pontifical Gregorian University for a year before attending the Pontifical Roman Major Seminary and Pontifical Lateran University, earning a doctorate in canon law. He was ordained to the priesthood on 11 April 1936, and then furthered his studies at the Pontifical Ecclesiastical Academy until 1939.

Bafile was an attaché of the Secretariat of State of the Holy See and did pastoral work in Rome, from 1939 to 1960. During this time, he also served as chaplain to the Abruzzi community in Rome and to the Legion of Mary. He was raised to the rank of Domestic Prelate of His Holiness on 24 June 1954.

== Episcopal career ==
On 13 February 1960, Bafile was appointed Apostolic Nuncio to Germany and Titular Archbishop of Antiochia in Pisidia on 13 February 1960 by Pope John XXIII. He received his episcopal consecration on the following 19 March from John XXIII himself, with Archbishop Diego Venini and Bishop Petrus Canisius Van Lierde, OSA, serving as co-consecrators, at the Sistine Chapel. He attended the Second Vatican Council from 1962 to 1965, and was later named Pro-Prefect of the Congregation for the Causes of the Saints on 18 July 1975.

Pope Paul VI created him Cardinal-Deacon of S. Maria in Portico in the consistory of 24 May 1976, which allowed him to assume the title "Prefect". He was one of the cardinal electors, who participated in the conclaves of August and October 1978, which selected Popes John Paul I and John Paul II, respectively. He retired as prefect on 27 June 1980.

He died from complications with influenza at the Pius XI Clinic in Rome, at age 101. Cardinal Ratzinger presided over his funeral Mass before he was buried at his family's tomb in his native L'Aquila. His remains were later transferred to the church where he was baptized.

== Sources ==
- Catholic-Hierarchy
- The Cardinals of the Holy Roman Church

Catholic Church titles
Preceded by Aloisius Joseph Muench	Apostolic Nuncio to Germany; 1960–1975	Succeeded by Guido Del Mestri
Preceded by Luigi Raimondi	Prefect of the Congregation for the Causes of Saints; 1975–1980	Succeeded by Pietro Palazzini
Records
Preceded by Ignatius Kung Pin-Mei	Oldest living Member of the Sacred College; 12 March 2000 – 3 February 2005	Succeeded by Johannes Willebrands
