= Roman Catholic Diocese of Rochester =

Latin Catholic ecclesiastical jurisdiction in New York, USA

Coordinates: 43°09′56″N 77°36′41″W

Diocese of Rochester Dioecesis Roffensis

Catholic
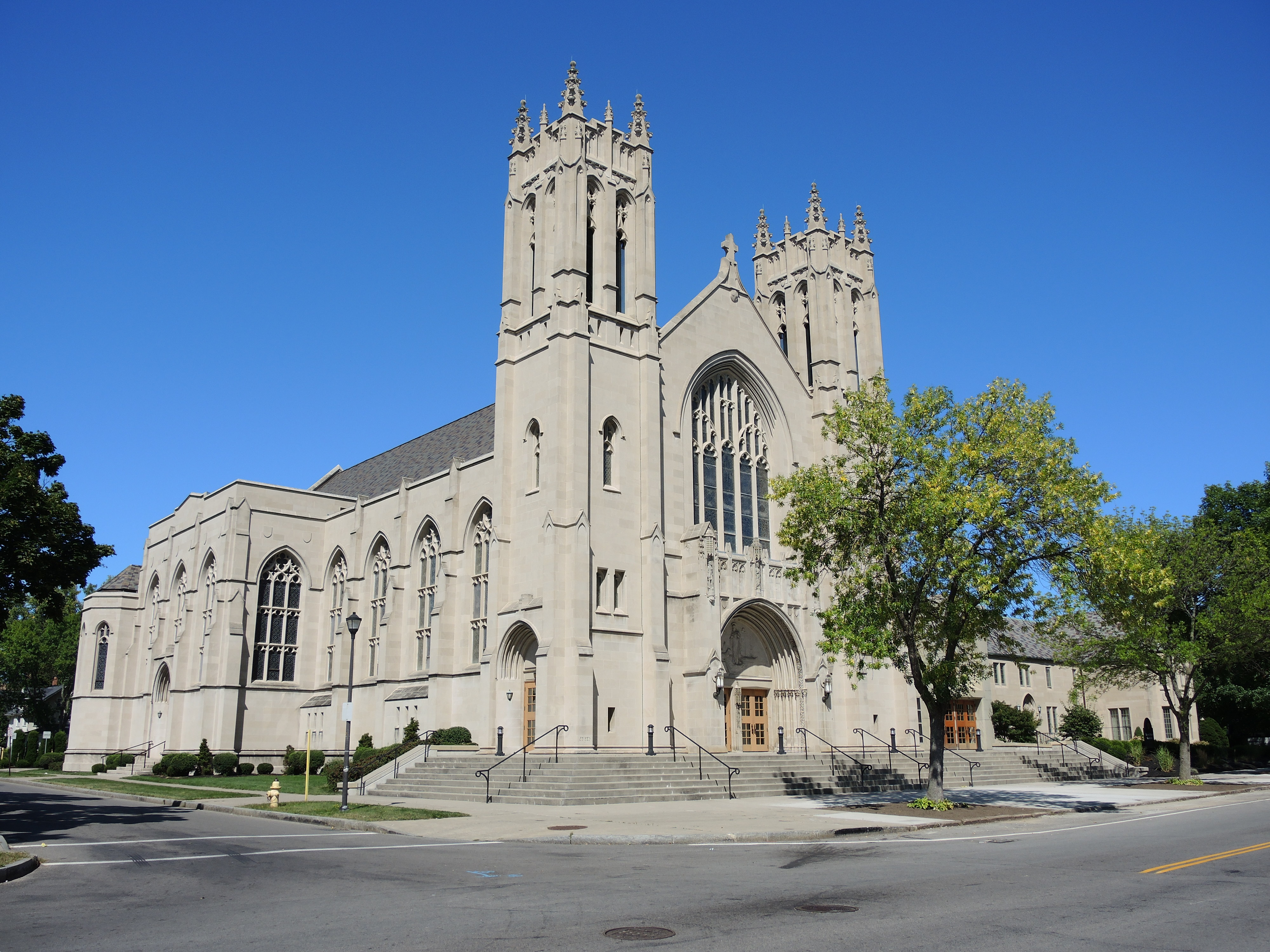
- Sacred Heart Cathedral

- Coat of arms

Location
- Country: United States
- Territory: (New York (state)) New York counties of Cayuga, Chemung, Livingston, Monroe, Ontario, Schuyler, Seneca, Steuben, Tioga, Tompkins, Yates and Wayne
- Episcopal conference: United States Conference of Catholic Bishops
- Ecclesiastical region: Region II
- Ecclesiastical province: New York
- Deaneries: 7

Statistics
- Area: 8,772 sq mi (22,720 km^{2})
- Population: Total; Catholics: (as of 2014); 1,570,000; 350,000 (23%)
- Parishes: 106
- Churches: 172
- Congregations: 172
- Schools: 27

Information
- Denomination: Catholic
- Sui iuris church: Latin Church
- Rite: Roman Rite
- Established: March 3, 1868; 158 years ago
- Cathedral: Cathedral of the Sacred Heart
- Patron saint: St. John Fisher
- Secular priests: 251

Current leadership
- Pope: Leo XIV
- Bishop: John S. Bonnici
- Metropolitan Archbishop: Ronald A. Hicks
- Vicar General: Paul J. Tomasso
- Bishops emeritus: Salvatore Ronald Matano

Map
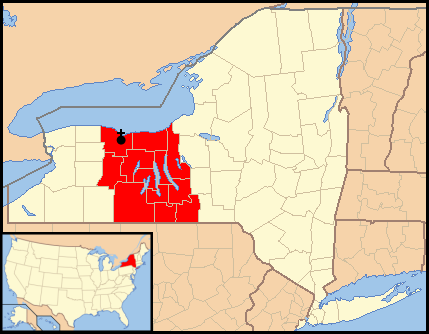

Website
- www.dor.org

The Diocese of Rochester (Latin: Dioecesis Roffensis) is a diocese of the Catholic Church in the Upstate region of New York State in the United States. The metropolitan for the diocese is the archbishop of New York. The cathedral parish for the diocese is the Cathedral of the Sacred Heart in Rochester. The diocese comprises approximately 350,000 Catholics, 22 diocesan elementary schools, and seven independent parochial high schools. The bishop is John Bonnici.

== Territory ==
The Diocese of Rochester extends from Lake Ontario through Rochester, New York, and the Finger Lakes region to part of the Southern Tier region near the New York-Pennsylvania border.

== History ==
=== Early history ===
During the Dutch and British rule of the Province of New York in the 17th and 18th centuries, Catholics were banned from the colony. Richard Coote, the first colonial governor, passed a law at the end of the 17th century that mandated a life sentence to any Catholic priest found in the colony. The penalty for harboring a Catholic was a £250 fine plus three days in the pillory. In 1763, Catholic Bishop Richard Challoner of London stated that: "there is not much likelihood that Catholic priests will be permitted to enter these provinces."

During the American Revolution, the new State of New York in 1777 approved a constitution that guaranteed freedom of worship for Catholics. This was soon followed by the same guarantee in the US Bill of Rights.

=== 1784 to 1868 ===
In 1784, Pope Pius VI erected the Apostolic Prefecture of United States of America, including all of the new United States. In 1789, the same pope raised this prefecture to the Diocese of Baltimore. In 1808, Pope Pius VII erected the Diocese of New York, taking all of New York State from the Diocese of Baltimore.

In Auburn, the first mass for non-native Catholics was held in a private residence in 1816. The first church in the future City of Rochester was St. Patrick's, built in 1823. In 1832, the first church was constructed in Geneva, New York, St. Francis de Sales. Pope Pius IX erected the Diocese of Buffalo in 1847, including all of the present-day Diocese of Rochester.

=== 1868 to 1881 ===
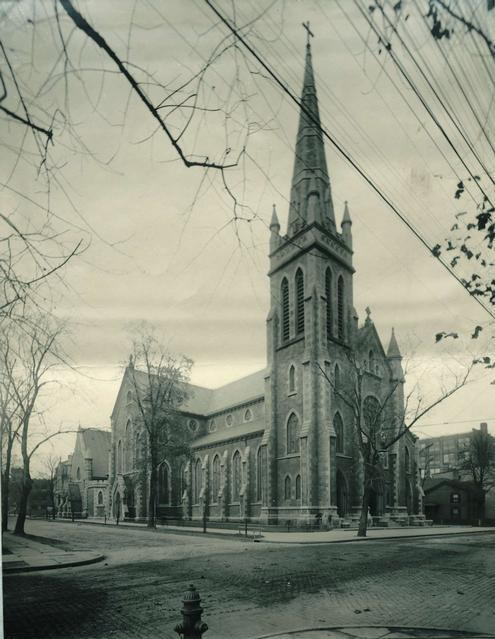
St. Patrick's Cathedral, Rochester, New York (1914)

The Diocese of Rochester was erected on March 3, 1868, by Pius IX. He transferred eight counties (Monroe, Livingston, Wayne, Ontario, Seneca, Cayuga, Yates, and Tompkins) from the Diocese of Buffalo to the new diocese. The pope appointed Monsignor Bernard J. McQuaid, from the Diocese of New York, as the first bishop of Rochester. The new diocese included approximately 54,500 Catholics, 35 parish churches and 29 mission churches.

When McQuaid first arrived in Rochester, the only parochial schools were operated by the five German-language parishes, educating a total of 2,000 students. In 1870, McQuaid opened St. Patrick minor seminary for young men. It was renamed St. Andrew's in 1879. In 1871, McQuaid announced his plan to create a system of tuition-free parochial schools in the diocese, staffed by the Sisters of St. Joseph.

=== 1881 to 1900 ===
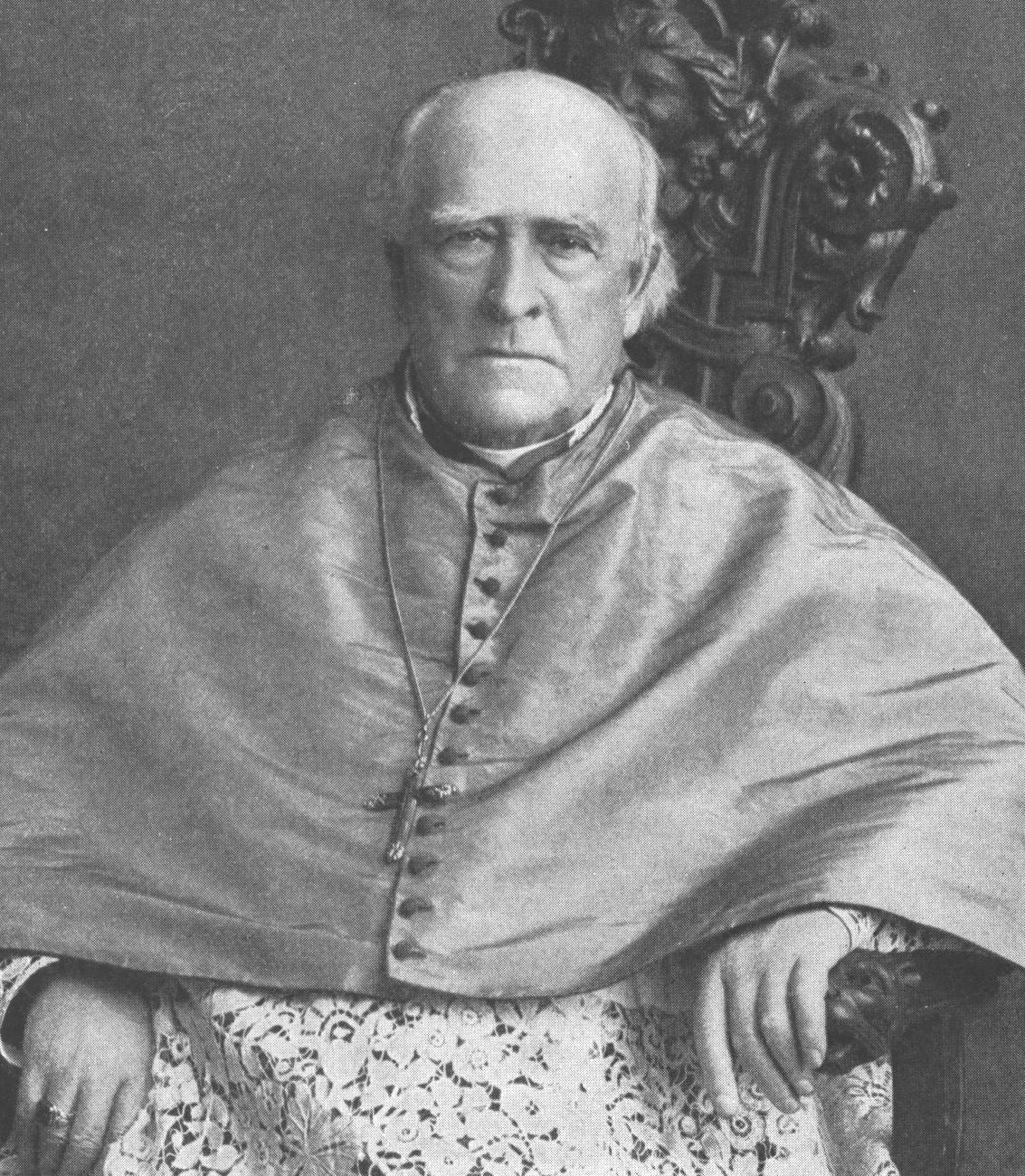
Bishop McQuaid (pre-1909)

In September 1893, Saint Bernard's Seminary opened in Rochester with 39 seminarians and eight faculty members. The faculty included Edward Hanna as professor of dogmatic theology and Andrew Breen as professor of Hebrew and Scripture. McQuaid himself taught homiletics there. By 1910, Saint Bernard's had an enrollment of 233 seminarians, second only to St. Mary's Seminary in Baltimore.

In 1896, Pope Leo XIII transferred four more southern counties (Schuyler, Tioga, Chemung, and Steuben) from the Diocese of Buffalo to the Diocese of Rochester, forming its current boundaries.

=== 1900 to 1933 ===
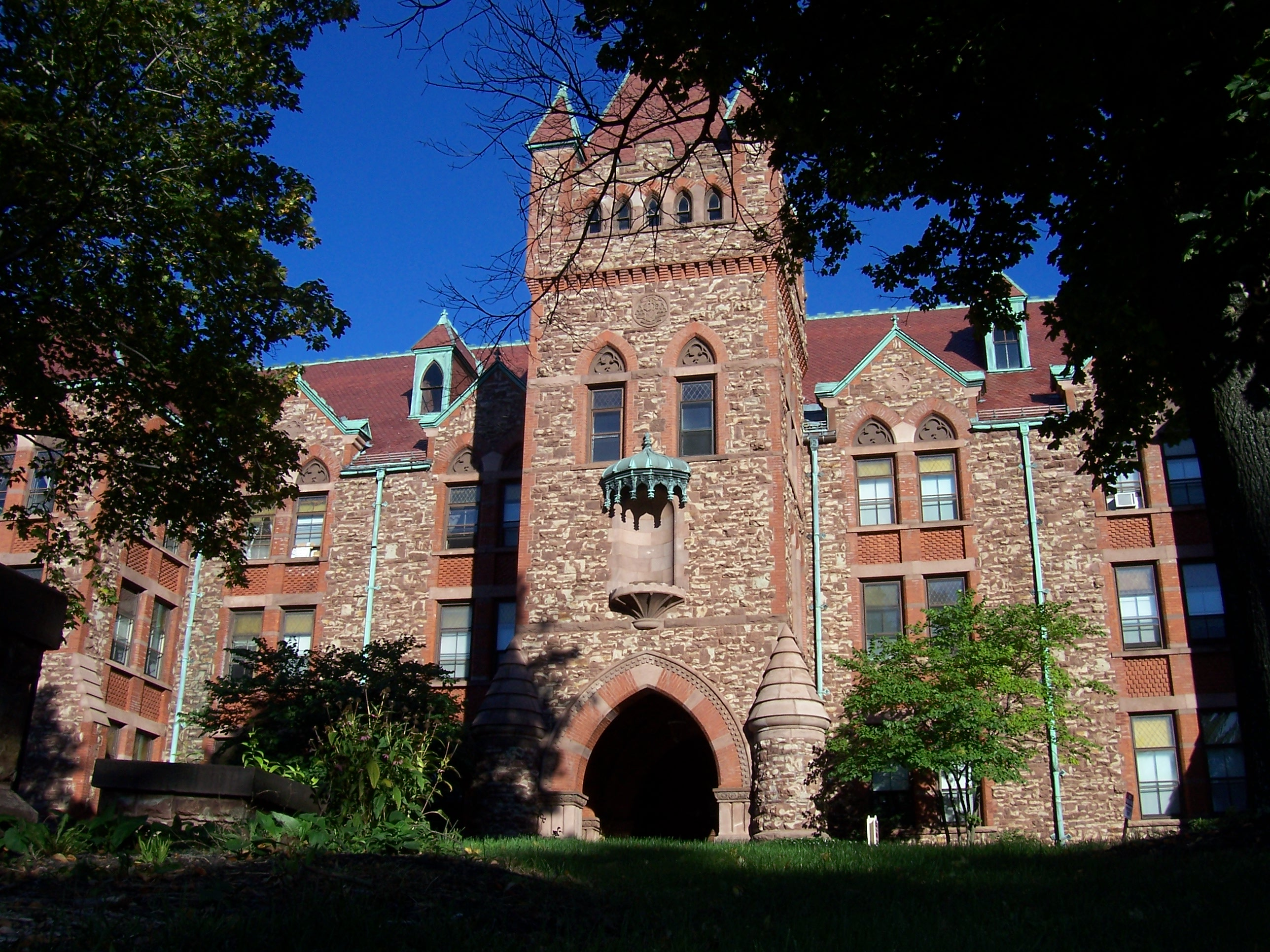
St. Bernard's Seminary, Rochester, New York (2012)

In 1905, Pope Pius X appointed Thomas F. Hickey of Rochester as coadjutor bishop in the diocese to assist McQuaid. McQuaid died in 1909. At that time, 53 of the diocese's 93 parishes had their own parochial school, with a total of 18,000 students. After McQuaid's death, Hickey became the second bishop of Rochester.

Hickey established a catechetical program for Catholic children enrolled in public schools. He supported the apostolate to deaf persons, pioneered the work of Catholic Charities within the diocese, and helped the New York bishops establish an office to communicate with the New York Legislature about Catholic concerns. Hickey led the creation of the Aquinas Institute for Boys and Nazareth Academy for girls in Rochester, and the founding of Nazareth College in Pittsford. Hickey retired in 1928.

In 1929, John Francis O'Hern of Rochester was appointed the third bishop of the diocese by Pope Pius XI. During his tenure, O'Hern worked toward establishing ecumenical ties with non-Catholics and promoting numerous associations of the laity. He supported the Community Chest and American Red Cross, and provided chaplains for Catholics students attending secular colleges in the diocese. O'Hern died in 1933.

=== 1933 to 1969 ===
Bishop Sheen (1952)

Pope Pius XI named Archbishop Edward Mooney, formerly the Apostolic Delegate to Japan, as the next bishop of Rochester in 1933. During his tenure in Rochester, Mooney promoted the Catholic Action movement and the Knights of Peter Claver as a means of outreach to the African-American community. He also took a deep interest in Catholic social teaching and labor relations. In 1937, Pius XI appointed Mooney as the first archbishop of the Archdiocese of Detroit.

To replace Mooney in Rochester, Pius IX in 1937 selected Bishop James E. Kearney of the Diocese of Salt Lake. Kearney did much of the original planning of McQuaid Jesuit High School in Brighton. Kearney resigned in 1966. Pope Paul VI then named Auxiliary Bishop Fulton J. Sheen of New York as the next bishop of Rochester. While serving in Rochester, he created the Sheen Ecumenical Housing Foundation.

In 1967, Sheen decided to give the St. Bridget's Parish building to the federal Housing and Urban Development program. Sheen wanted to let the government use it for services for African-Americans. There was a protest in the community since Sheen had acted on his own accord. The pastor disagreed with Sheen's initiative, saying that "There is enough empty property around without taking down the church and the school." The deal eventually fell through. Sheen resigned as bishop in 1969 to devote more time to his writings; Pope Paul VI elevated him to a titular archbishop.

=== 1969 to present ===
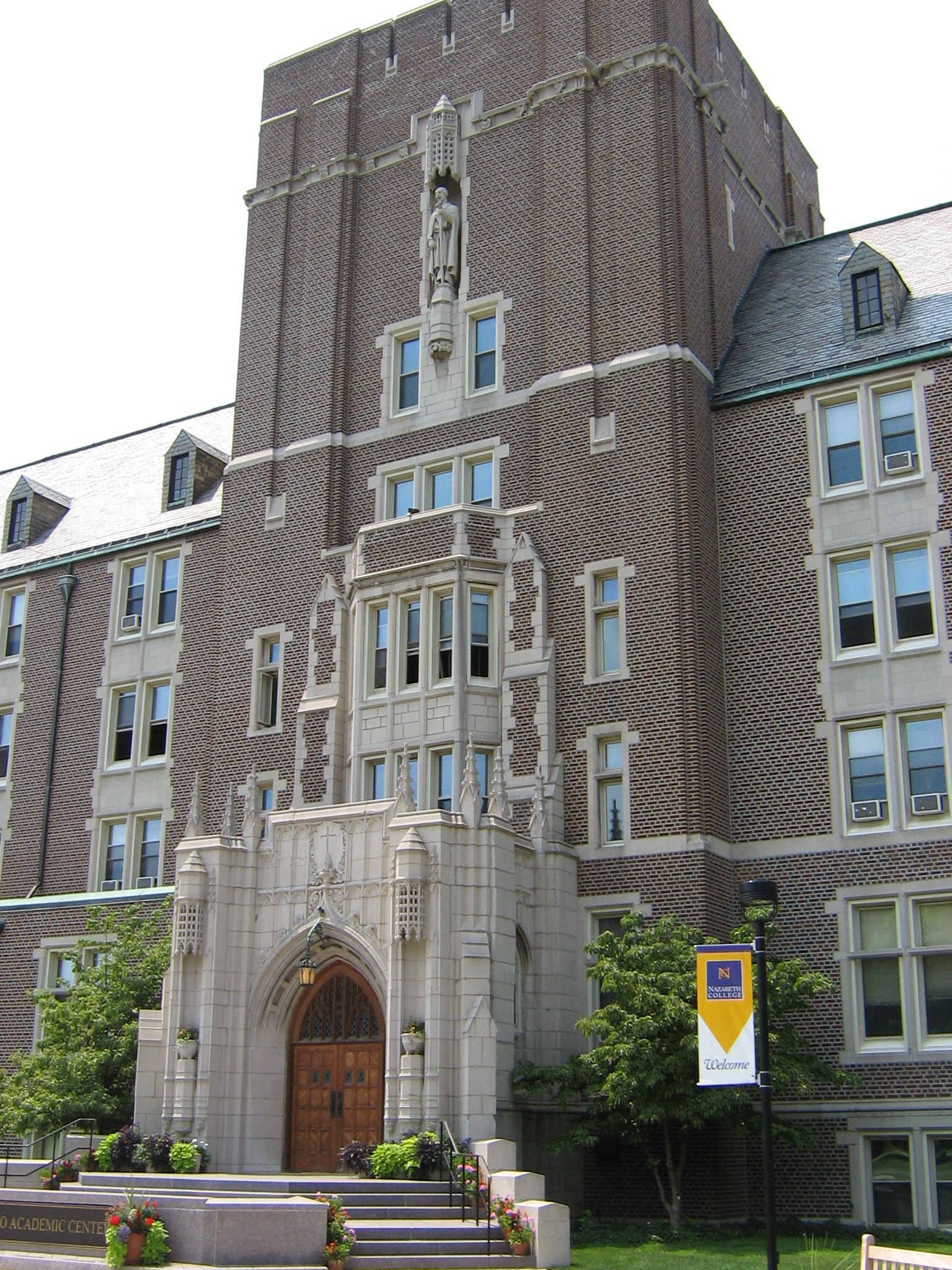
Nazareth University, Pittsford, New York (2012)

To replace Sheen in Rochester, Paul VI in 1969 selected Monsignor Joseph Hogan as bishop. After serving nine years as bishop, Hogan resigned in 1978. Pope John Paul II then named Matthew H. Clark as the next bishop of Rochester. In August 1985, Brother John Walsh, vice principal of Cardinal Mooney High School in Greece, New York, was arrested on kidnapping charges. Walsh had forced two boys he encountered on the street in Rochester into his car at gunpoint and tried to pay them for sex. He later released the boys unharmed. Walsh pleaded guilty in January 1986 to coercion and unlawful imprisonment and was sentenced to six months in jail. In 1986, Cardinal Josef Ratzinger ordered Clark to withdraw his imprimatur, or church approval, from a sex education manual written by a diocesan priest. Ratzinger said the manual was "defective" on church teachings. That same year, Clark defended one of his priests, the theologian Charles Curran, from criticism by Vatican officials for his stands on birth control, abortion rights for women, homosexuality, and divorce. Gerard Guli of Holy Rosary Parish in Rochester was arrested in April 1989 on first-degree sexual abuse charges. He was accused of fondling the breasts of a nursing home patient who had severe Alzheimer's disease. Guli pleaded guilty later that year and was sentenced to five years of probation. Gull was later laicized at his own request.

Eugene Emo was arrested in February 1996 on charges of sexually abusing a man with developmental disabilities in Cohocton, New York. The diocese had removed Emo from St. Januarius Parish in Naples, New York, in 1993 after he tried to cover the theft of parish funds by some boys and after a housekeeper found handcuffs and pictures of young men in his residence. The diocese sent Emo for treatment, then transferred him to a different parish. Emo pleaded guilty to one felony count of first-degree sexual assault and was sentenced to six months in jail and five years probation. By this time, the diocese had received several other complaints of sexual abuse by Emo. In 1999, he violated his probation by having contact with a 16-year-old boy and was returned to prison.

In 1998, the diocese removed James Callan as pastor of Corpus Christi Parish in Rochester. Callan had come into conflict with the diocese for opening communion to non-Catholics and blessing the unions of LGBTQ couples. He also allowed Mary Rammerman, a lay pastor, to raise the chalice during mass. After the diocese transferred Callan and fired Rammerman, the congregation split from the diocese, forming Spiritus Christi Church. The diocese later removed Callan from his ministerial duties after he appeared at a service at the new church.

In May 2002, two men sued the diocese, stating that they had been sexually abused by Robert O'Neil, pastor of St. Christopher Parish in Chili, New York. The plaintiffs said that O'Neil took them in the 1970s to his cottage in Chaumont, New York, where he plied them with alcohol and abused them. They later complained about O'Neil to auxiliary bishop Dennis Hickey. The diocese sent O'Neil away for treatment, then reassigned him to pastoral work. A week before the lawsuit was filed in 2002, the diocese stripped O'Neil of his ministerial duties and banned him from diocesan housing.

In 2003, Clark was criticized over his $11 million renovation and liturgical re-alignment of Sacred Heart Cathedral in Rochester. Clark received some credit for clamping down on abusive priests; in 2004, the diocese was deemed to be in "full compliance" with the US Conference of Catholic Bishops (USCCB) Charter for the Protection of Children and Young People. Clark presided over the unpopular closing of many of Rochester's parochial schools and parishes, pledging to complete the "re-sizing" of the diocese prior to his retirement in 2012.

Dennis Sewar of Annunciation Parish in Rochester was arrested in July 2005 on charges of sexual abuse and endangering the welfare of a child. The male accuser said that Sewar groped him numerous times between 1999 and 2001. After a judge dismissed the more serious charges, Sewar pleaded guilty in August 2006 to attempted endangering the welfare of a child and was sentenced to one year of probation.

The diocese revealed in June 2018 that it had paid $1.6 million in compensation since 1950 to 20 individuals who had been sexually abused by diocesan clergy. Most of the payments occurred after 2002, although some were decades old. In June 2019, a Rochester man sued the diocese alleging sexual abuse by Francis Vogt between 1969 and 1971. The plaintiff said that Vogt started abusing him when he was five-years-old and that the diocese shielded Vogt from potential prosecution.

The ninth bishop of Rochester was Salvatore Matano, formerly bishop of the Diocese of Burlington. He was appointed by Pope Francis in 2013. In September 2017, the diocese inaugurated its sesquicentennial anniversary, marked by a Solemn Mass at Sacred Heart Cathedral. The event marked a year-long celebration of the 150-year anniversary and the year of the Eucharist, which Matano proclaimed on the Feast of Corpus Christi.

The diocese filed for bankruptcy protection in September 2019 in the wake of multiple sexual abuse lawsuits. As of July 2024, the bankruptcy court was still working on a settlement. In January 2024, a jury awarded a $95 million verdict against the diocese. The defendant had accused Foster P. Rogers, assistant pastor at St. Alphonsus Parish in Auburn, of sexually abusing him in 1979 when he was 15-years-old. Clark had removed Rogers from ministry in 2002 after the diocese transferred him to several parishes.

Pope Leo XIV accepted Matano's resignation in 2026 and appointed John S. Bonnici as the tenth bishop of Rochester. He was formerly an auxiliary bishop of the Archdiocese of New York.

=== Statistics ===
The Diocese of Rochester grew as more Catholic immigrants moved to Rochester, peaking in the 1960s. Since then, the Catholic population has stabilized while the number of priests and religious sisters has fallen.

- 1909 – 121,000 Catholics in 93 parishes, 36 missions and 53 parish schools with 18,000 pupils. The diocese had 164 priests and over 500 sisters.
- 1938 – 223,657 Catholics in 129 parishes, 36 missions and 72 parish schools serving 23,796 pupils. There were 289 active diocesan priests.
- 1966 – 361,790 Catholics in 155 parishes, 36 mission churches and 99 elementary parish schools serving 45,540 pupils. There were 371 active diocesan priests and 1,549 sisters.
- 1978 – 358,850 Catholics in 161 parishes, 29 mission churches and 75 schools serving 19,526 pupils. There were 311 active diocesan priests and 1,095 sisters.
- 1992 – 162 parishes and 58 elementary schools serving 11,992 pupils. There were 208 active diocesan priests and 842 sisters.

== Bishops ==
=== Bishops of Rochester ===
1. Bernard J. McQuaid (1868–1909)
2. Thomas F. Hickey (1909–1928; coadjutor bishop 1905–1909), appointed archbishop ad personam upon retirement
3. John Francis O'Hern (1929–1933)
4. Edward A. Mooney (1933–1937), archbishop (ad personam), appointed Archbishop of Detroit (Cardinal in 1946)
5. James E. Kearney (1937–1966)
6. Blessed Fulton J. Sheen (1966–1969), appointed archbishop ad personam upon resignation
7. Joseph Lloyd Hogan (1969–1978)
8. Matthew H. Clark (1979–2012)
9. Salvatore Ronald Matano (2014–2026)
10. John S. Bonnici (2026–present)

=== Former auxiliary bishops ===
- Lawrence B. Casey (1953–1966), appointed bishop of Paterson
- John Edgar McCafferty (1968–1980)
- Dennis Walter Hickey (1968–1990)

=== Other diocesan priests who became bishops ===
- Edward Joseph Hanna, appointed auxiliary bishop of San Francisco in 1912 and later archbishop of San Francisco
- Walter Andrew Foery, appointed bishop of Syracuse in 1937
- James Michael Moynihan, appointed bishop of Syracuse in 1995

== Schools ==
=== Superintendents ===
Name	Tenure
Sr. Roberta Tierney, SSND	1976 – 1978
Timothy Leahy	1978 – 1979
Rev. Richard C. Kinsky, CSB	1979 – 1981
Sr. Edwardine Weaver, RSM	1981 – 1986
Br. Brian Walsh, CFC	1986 – 1991
Sr. Mary Ann Binsack, RSM	1991 – 1992
Timothy W. Dwyer	1992 – 2001
Sr. Elizabeth Meegan, OP	2001 – 2006
Sr. Elaine Poitras, CSC	2006 – 2008
Sr. Janice Morgan, CSJ	2008
Anne Willkens Leach	2008 – 2013
Anthony S. Cook III	2013 – 2019
James Tauzel	2019 – Present

=== Primary schools as of 2026 ===
Schools
School	Parish	Location	Established	Grades
St. Agnes School	St. Agnes	Avon	1878	Pre-K to Grade 5
St. Francis de Sales–St. Stephen School	Our Lady of Peace	Geneva		Pre-K to Grade 6
St. Mary School	St. Mary	Canandaigua	1849	pre-K to Grade 8
St. Michael School	St. Michael	Penn Yan	1882	Pre-K to Grade 5
St. Patrick's School	St. Patrick's	Victor		pre-K
Holy Cross School	Holy Cross	Rochester	2011	Pre-K to Grade 6
St. Joseph School	St. Joseph	Penfield	1960	Pre-K to Grade 6
St. Ambrose Academy	Peace of Christ	Irondequoit		Pre-K to Grade 6
St. Lawrence School	St. Lawrence	Greece		Pre-K to Grade 5
St. Louis School	St. Louis	Pittsford		Pre-K to Grade 5
St. Pius X School	St. Pius X	Chili	1954	Pre-K to Grade 5
St. Rita School	St. Rita	Webster	1957	Pre-K to Grade 5
Seton Catholic School	Our Lady of Lourdes/St. Anne	Brighton	1948	Pre-K to Grade 6
St. Mary Our Mother School	St. Mary Our Mother	Horseheads		Pre-K to Grade 6

=== Private Catholic Schools 2026 ===
Schools
School	Address	Grades
Nativity Preparatory Academy	15 Whalin Street, Rochester	Grades 5 to 8
Nazareth Elementary	311 Flower City Park, Rochester	Pre-K to Grade 6
St. Albert the Great	134 Washington Street, Auburn	Pre-K to Grade 6

=== High schools ===
Schools
School	Founding religious order	Location	Established	Grades
Aquinas Institute	Basilian	Rochester	1902	Grades 6 to 12
Bishop Kearney High School	Christian Brothers – Sisters of Notre Dame	Irondequoit	1962	Grades 7 to 12
McQuaid Jesuit High School	Jesuits	Brighton	1954	Grades 6 to 12
Notre Dame High School	Sisters of Mercy	Elmira	1955	Grades 7 to 12
Our Lady of Mercy School for Young Women	Sisters of Mercy	Brighton	1928	Grades 6 to 12

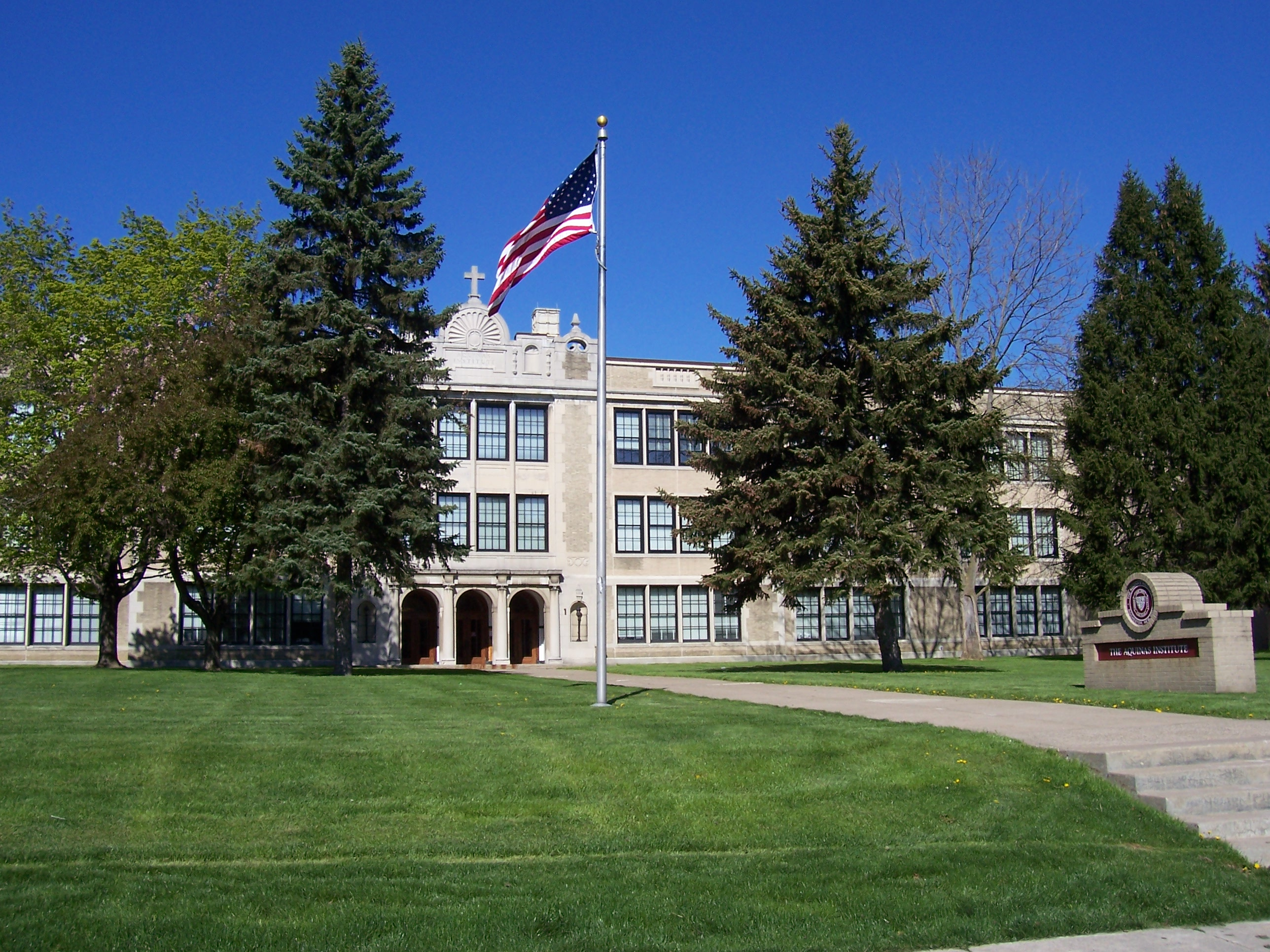
Aquinas Institute – Rochester

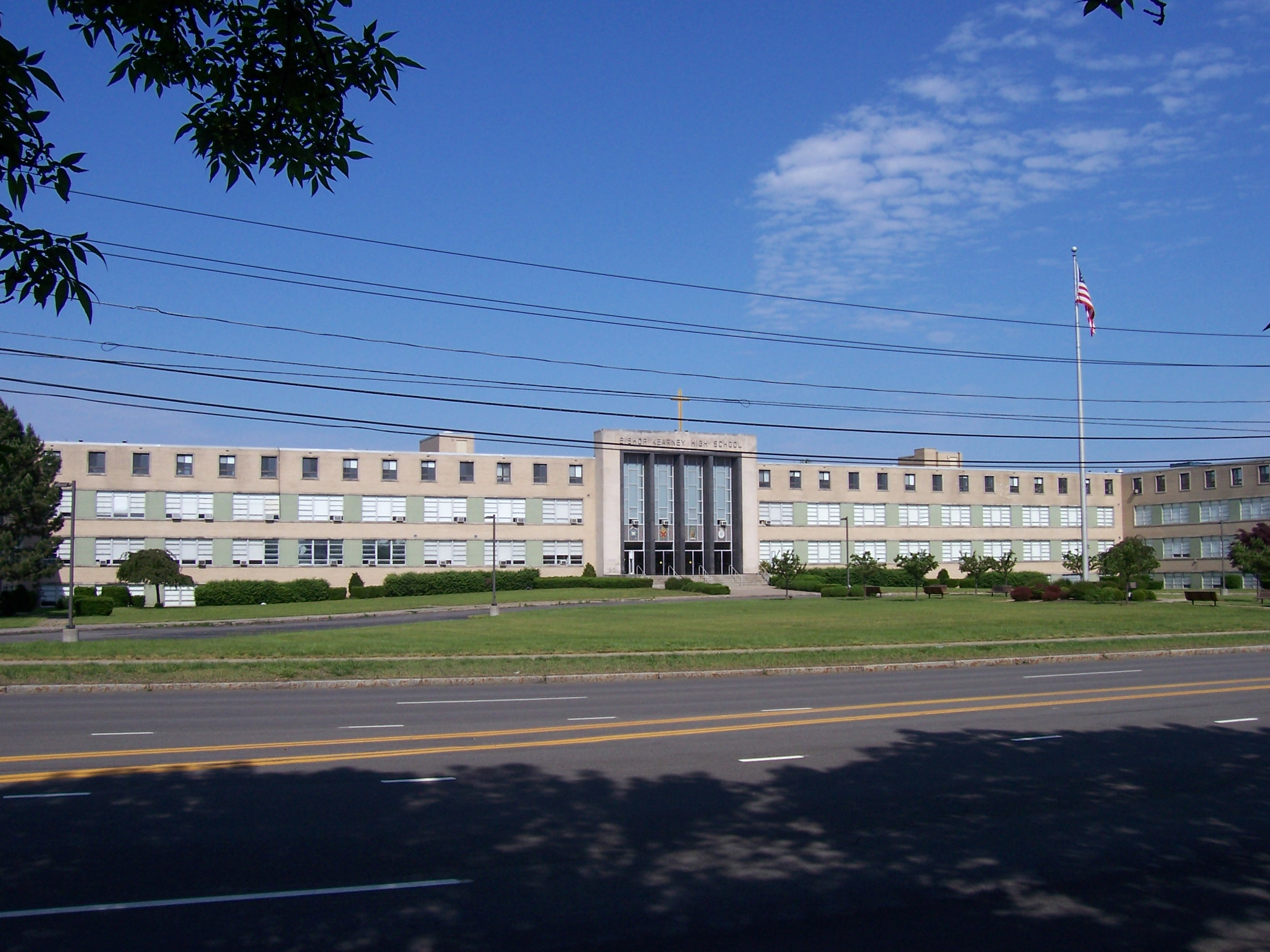
Bishop Kearney High School – Irondequoit

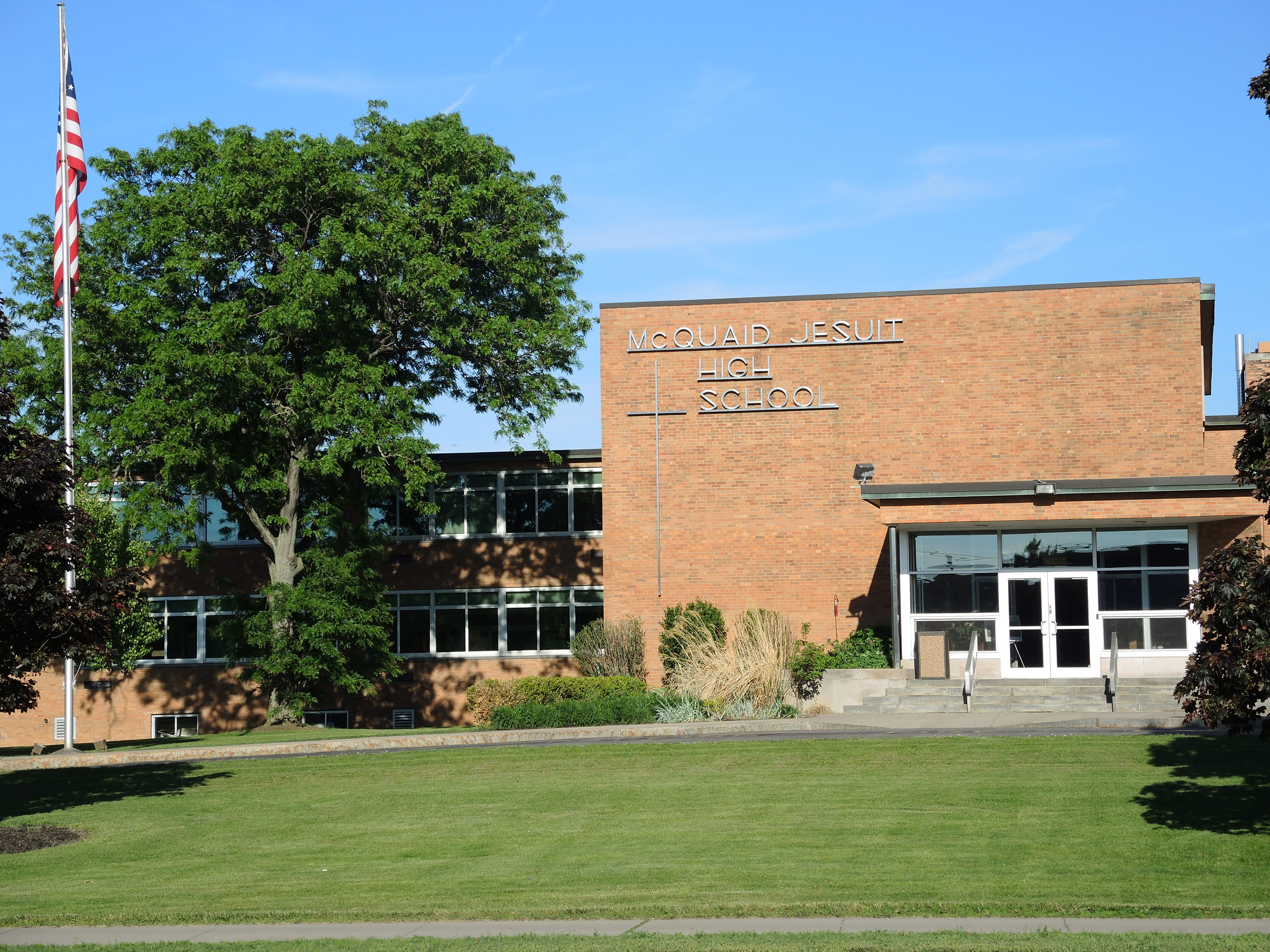
McQuaid Jesuit High School – Brighton

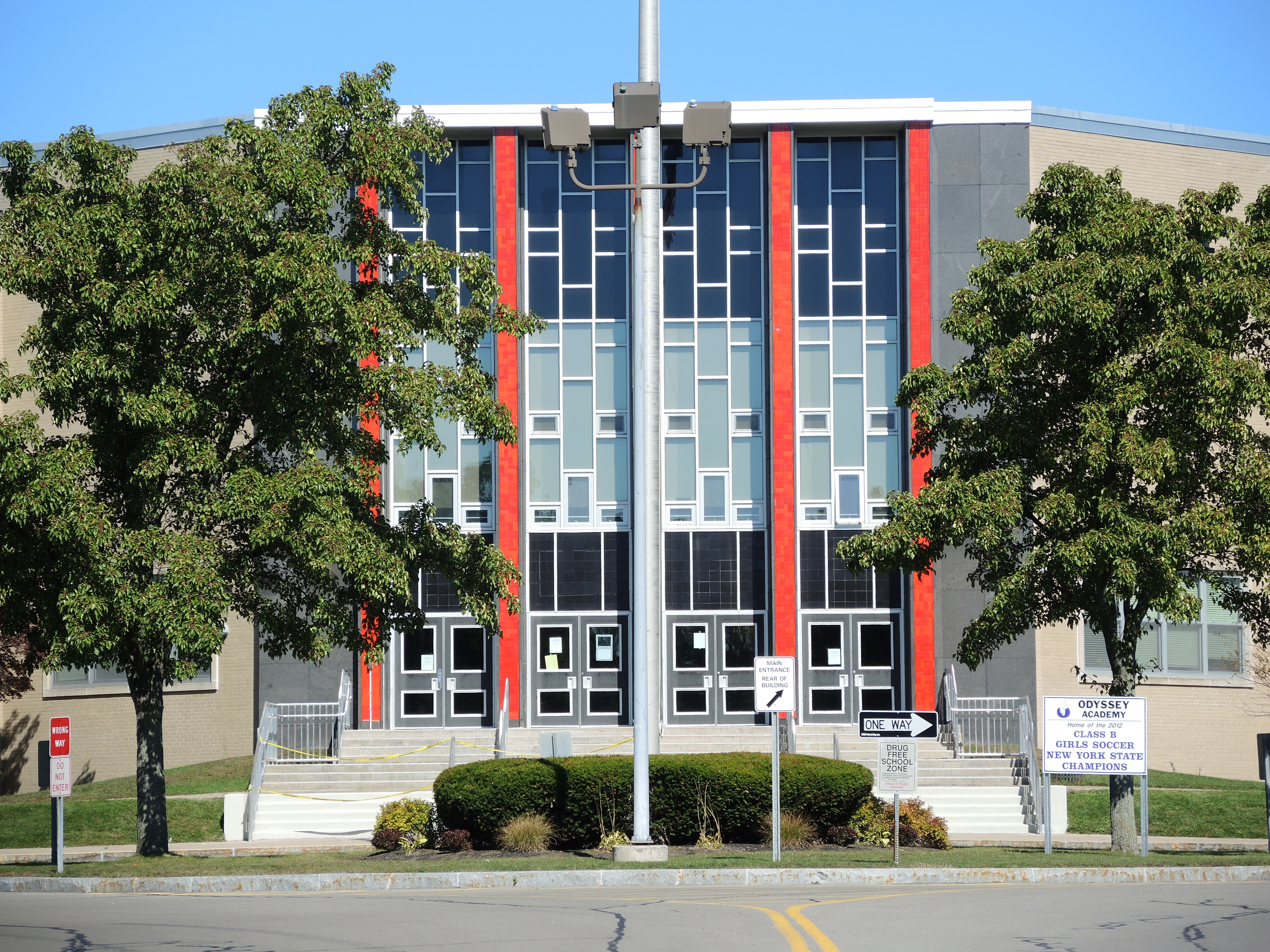
Cardinal Mooney High School – Greece (closed)

== Publishing ==
The Rochester Catholic Press Association, Inc. (RCPA) is the publishing arm of the Diocese of Rochester. The RCPA publishes the monthly Catholic Courier newspaper, the Spanish-language El Mensajero Católico, the Official Directory of the Diocese of Rochester and related digital media.

The Courier was founded in 1889 as The Catholic Journal. The diocese took over the newspaper during the Great Depression. The paper became the Catholic Courier in 1989, its 100th anniversary. The Courier has won state and national awards for journalistic excellence.

== Arms ==
Coat of arms of Roman Catholic Diocese of Rochester
Notes Arms was designed in the 1930s by Pierre LaRose Escutcheon The arms of the diocese are composed of a saltire with a crescent in the center. Symbolism The St. Andrew's Cross (saltire) was taken from the coat of arms of the original Diocese of Rochester in England (now an Anglican diocese). The new design is distinguished from the original, by changing a scallop shell in the center to the crescent symbol of the Immaculate Conception.

== Sources ==
- Janus, Glen (1993). "Bishop Bernard McQuaid: On "True" and "False" Americanism". U.S. Catholic Historian. 11 (3): 53–76. JSTOR 25153987.
- McNamara, Robert F. (1998). The Diocese of Rochester in America, 1868-1993. Rochester, NY: Roman Catholic Diocese of Rochester.
- Zwierlein, Frederick J. (1925). The Life and Letters of Bishop McQuaid. Vol. I. Rochester, NY: The Art Print Shop.
- Zwierlein, Frederick J. (1926). The Life and Letters of Bishop McQuaid. Vol. II. Rochester, NY: The Art Print Shop.
