= Fulton J. Sheen =

American beatified Catholic bishop and televangelist (1895–1979)

Blessed Fulton J. Sheen T.O.Carm
- Titular Archbishop of Newport; Bishop of Rochester
- Sheen on the set of his show Life Is Worth Living
- Church: Catholic Church
- See: Rochester
- Appointed: October 21, 1966
- Term ended: October 6, 1969
- Predecessor: James Edward Kearney
- Successor: Joseph Lloyd Hogan
- Previous post: Auxiliary Bishop of New York & Titular Bishop of Caesariana (1951–1966)

Orders
- Ordination: September 20, 1919 by Edmund Michael Dunne
- Consecration: June 11, 1951 by Adeodato Giovanni Piazza

Personal details
- Born: Peter John Sheen; May 8, 1895 El Paso, Illinois, U.S.
- Died: December 9, 1979 (aged 84) New York City, U.S.
- Buried: St. Patrick's Cathedral, New York City (1979–2019); St. Mary's Cathedral, Peoria, Illinois (since 2019)
- Occupation: Catholic bishop; evangelist; professor
- Education: St. Viator College (BA, MA); St. Paul Seminary; Catholic University of America (JCB); Catholic University of Leuven (PhD); Pontifical University of Saint Thomas Aquinas
- Motto: Da per matrem me venire (Latin for 'Grant that I may come [to You] through the mother [Mary]')
- Signature: Fulton J. Sheen's signature

Sainthood
- Feast day: December 9
- Venerated in: Catholic Church (United States)
- Title as Saint: Blessed
- Beatified: September 24, 2026; The Dome at America's Center, St. Louis, Missouri, US by Luis Antonio Tagle on behalf of Pope Leo XIV
- Attributes: Bishop's vestments; Chalkboard and chalk; Television
- Patronage: Evangelists and preachers; Broadcasters; Celebrities
- Shrines: Tomb (St. Mary's Cathedral, Peoria, Illinois); Birthplace museum in El Paso, Illinois; Fulton Sheen Museum, Peoria

Ordination history
History
Priestly ordination
- Ordained by: Edmund Michael Dunne
- Date: September 20, 1919
Episcopal consecration
- Principal consecrator: Adeodato Giovanni Piazza
- Co-consecrators: Martin John O'Connor; Leone Giovanni Battista Nigris
- Date: June 11, 1951
Episcopal succession
Bishops consecrated by Fulton J. Sheen as principal consecrator
- Joseph Brendan Houlihan: November 20, 1960
- Styles
- Reference style: The Most Reverend
- Spoken style: Your Excellency
- Religious style: Your Excellency
- Posthumous style: Blessed

Fulton John Sheen (born Peter John Sheen; May 8, 1895 – December 9, 1979) was an American Catholic prelate who served as the Bishop of Rochester from 1966 to 1969. He was known for his preaching, especially on television and radio.

Ordained a priest of the Diocese of Peoria in Illinois in 1919, Sheen quickly became a renowned theologian, earning the Cardinal Mercier Prize for International Philosophy in 1923. He went on to teach theology and philosophy at the Catholic University of America in Washington, D.C. and served as a parish priest before he was appointed an auxiliary bishop for the Archdiocese of New York in 1951. He held this position until 1966, when he was made Bishop of Rochester. He resigned in 1969 as his 75th birthday approached and was made archbishop of the titular see of Newport (a suppressed diocese in Wales).

For 20 years as "Father Sheen," later monsignor, he hosted the night-time radio program The Catholic Hour on NBC (1930–1950) before he moved to television and presented Life Is Worth Living (1952–1957). Sheen's final presenting role was on the syndicated The Fulton Sheen Program (1961–1968) with a similar format to the earlier Life Is Worth Living show. For that work, Sheen won an Emmy Award for Most Outstanding Television Personality, and was featured on the cover of Time magazine. Starting in 2009, his shows were being re-broadcast on the EWTN and the Trinity Broadcasting Network's Church Channel cable networks. His contribution to televised preaching resulted in Sheen often being called one of the first televangelists.

The cause for his canonization was officially opened in 2002. Sheen was scheduled to be beatified in Peoria on December 21, 2019, but it was postponed for investigation. Following thorough examination, on September 24, 2026, Sheen was beatified in St. Louis, by Cardinal Luis Antonio Tagle on the mandate of Pope Leo XIV.

== Early life ==
Peter John Sheen was born on May 8, 1895, in El Paso, Illinois, the oldest of four sons of Newton and Delia Sheen. His parents were of Irish descent, and their own parents were from Croghan, County Roscommon, Connacht. He was baptized as "Peter John" and called "P.J." as a boy. However, he came to prefer the name "Fulton", his mother's maiden name. As an infant, Sheen contracted tuberculosis.

After the family had moved to nearby Peoria, Illinois, Sheen's first role in the Catholic Church was as an altar boy at Cathedral of Saint Mary of the Immaculate Conception in Peoria.

Sheen graduated in 1913 from high school at Spalding Institute in Peoria with valedictorian honors. In 1913, he entered St. Viator College in Bourbonnais, Illinois and graduated in 1917.

Deciding to become a priest, he started his studies at Saint Paul Seminary in St. Paul, Minnesota.

== Ordination and further education ==
Sheen was ordained a priest for the Diocese of Peoria at the Cathedral of Saint Mary on September 20, 1919, by Bishop Edmund Dunne. After his 1919 ordination, Sheen continued his studies at the Catholic University of America in Washington, D.C. He celebrated his first Christmas Mass at St. Mark Parish in Peoria. His youthful appearance was still evident on one occasion when a local priest, unaware of his identity, asked Sheen to assist as altar boy during the celebration of the Mass.

After finishing his studies at Catholic University of America, he entered the Catholic University of Leuven in Belgium, earning a Doctor of Philosophy degree in 1923. His doctoral thesis was titled "The Spirit of Contemporary Philosophy and the Finite God". At Leuven, he became the first American to win the Cardinal Mercier Prize for the best philosophical treatise. In 1924, Sheen went to Rome to attend the Pontificium Collegium Internationale Angelicum.

== Priestly life ==
After Sheen returned to Peoria in 1926, Bishop Dunne assigned him as curate at St. Patrick's, a poor parish in Peoria. At that time, both Columbia University in New York and Oxford University in England wanted Sheen to teach philosophy. However, Sheen took the assignment at St. Patrick's without any complaints and later said that he enjoyed his time there. Nine months later, Dunne sent Sheen to Catholic University to teach.

However, instead of Catholic University of America, Sheen chose to teach theology at St. Edmund's College in Ware, England, where he met the priest Ronald Knox. He also assisted the pastor at St. Patrick's Parish in the Soho section of London. In 1928, Sheen finally returned to Catholic University of America, where he would teach philosophy until 1950.

In 1950, Sheen became the national director of the Society for the Propagation of the Faith in the United States. During his 16 years as director, Sheen raised millions of dollars for missionary efforts worldwide. He also donated $10 million that he earned from his later television programs.

=== Auxiliary Bishop of New York ===
Portrait of Sheen as a priest

On May 28, 1951, Pope Pius XII appointed Sheen as an auxiliary bishop for New York. He was consecrated in Rome at the Basilica of Santi Giovanni e Paulo on June 11, 1951. The principal consecrator was Cardinal Adeodato Giovanni Piazza. The co-consecrators were Archbishop Leone Giovanni Battista Nigris and Archbishop Martin John O'Connor.

=== Bishop of Rochester ===
On October 21, 1966, Pope Paul VI named Sheen as bishop of Rochester, N.Y. While serving in Rochester, Sheen created the Sheen Ecumenical Housing Foundation. He also denounced American involvement in the Vietnam War in late July 1967. On Ash Wednesday in 1967, Sheen decided to give St. Bridget's Parish building to the federal Housing and Urban Development program. Sheen wanted to let the government use it for black Americans. There was a protest since Sheen acted on his own accord. The pastor disagreed and the deal fell through.

On October 6, 1969, Sheen resigned as bishop of Rochester. Paul VI then named him as archbishop of the titular see of Newport, Wales.

=== Ecumenical efforts ===
In the 1950's and 1960's, Sheen made notable efforts to seek common ground with Christians from non-Catholic churches, both Eastern Orthodox and Protestant. He occasionally celebrated the Byzantine Divine Liturgy, with papal permission awarding him certain bi-ritual faculties. He often commended the Protestant devotion to Bible study and stated that he himself used Protestant commentaries when preparing sermons.

Sheen's autobiography summarized his ecumenical outlook when he stated that "every religion in the world has a segment of that truth."

== Broadcasting career ==
=== Radio ===
In 1930, Sheen began a weekly NBC Sunday-night radio broadcast, The Catholic Hour. During one broadcast, Sheen termed World War II as not just a political struggle but also a "theological one". He referred to German Chancellor Adolf Hitler as an example of the "Anti-Christ." Sheen was a staunch opponent of nationalism, and he vocally preached against Nazism and fascism. Time Magazine referred to Sheen in 1946 as "the golden-voiced Msgr. Fulton J. Sheen, U.S. Catholicism's famed proselytizer," and reported that his radio broadcast received 3,000 to 6,000 letters weekly from listeners. By 1950, The Catholic Hour had a weekly audience of four million listeners. Sheen was known for his strong and outspoken opposition to totalitarianism.

=== Television ===
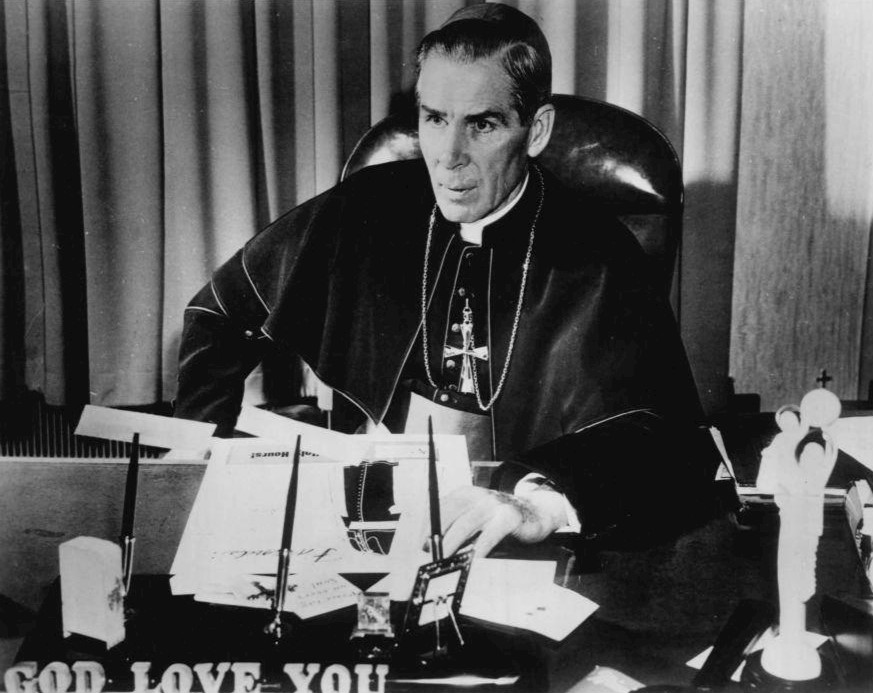
Sheen in 1956 on Life Is Worth Living.

At the Catholic University of America, Sheen in 1940 provided voice-over commentary for an Easter Sunday Mass. Broadcast on the experimental station W2XBS, it was one of the first televised religious services in the United States. During the sermon, Sheen remarked,

"This is the first religious television in the history of the world. Let, therefore, its first message be a tribute of thanks to God for giving the minds of our day the inspiration to unravel the secrets of the universe."

On February 12, 1952, Sheen began a weekly television program on the DuMont Television Network called Life Is Worth Living. Filmed at the Adelphi Theatre in New York City, the program consisted of Sheen speaking extemporaneously before a live audience. The show did not have a script or cue cards, although Sheen occasionally used a chalkboard. He was not paid for the program. Life is Worth Living was scheduled in a prime time slot on Tuesday nights at 8:00 p.m. Its competition was the Texaco Star Theater on NBC, a variety show starring comedian Milton Berle and the Frank Sinatra Show, another variety program on CBS.

Defying all expectations, Life is Worth Living became very popular. The Frank Sinatra Show was canceled in April 1952, leading to speculation that it was due to the success of Sheen's show. Berle, known as "Uncle Miltie," frequently used old vaudeville material on his show. Joking about Sheen, he said. "He uses old material, too." Berle also observed, "If I'm going to be eased off the top by anyone, it's better that I lose to the One for whom Bishop Sheen is speaking." Sheen responded to Berle, saying that perhaps people should start calling him "Uncle Fultie."

Life and Time magazines ran feature stories on Sheen. The number of stations carrying Life Is Worth Living jumped from three to fifteen in less than two months. The show started receiving 8,500 letters per week. The show received four times as many requests for studio tickets as could be fulfilled. The sponsor Admiral, a manufacturer of TVs and appliances, paid the production costs in return for a one-minute commercial at the show's opening and another minute at its close.

In 1952, Sheen won an Emmy Award for Most Outstanding personality. In accepting his Emmy, Sheen, "I feel it is time I pay tribute to my four writers – Matthew, Mark, Luke and John." At that time, Berle quipped, "We both work for 'Sky Chief'", a reference to God and Berle's sponsor, Texaco. Time called Sheen "the first 'televangelist'" and the Archdiocese of New York could not meet the demand for tickets. Sheen received a second Emmy nomination in 1953.

One of Sheen's best-remembered presentations came in February 1953, when he forcefully denounced the Soviet Union. Sheen gave a dramatic reading of the burial scene from Shakespeare's Julius Caesar. He substituted the names of Soviet leaders (Stalin, Lavrenty Beria, Georgy Malenkov, and Andrey Vyshinsky) for those of characters in the play (Julius Caesar, Gaius Cassius Longinus, Marc Antony and Marcus Junius Brutus). Sheen concluded the presentation by saying, "Stalin must one day meet his judgment." Days later, Stalin suffered a stroke and died within the week.

Life Is Worth Living ran until 1957, drawing as many as 30 million people weekly, mostly non-Catholics. He received his third Emmy nomination in 1957.

Sheen returned to television in 1961 with a nationally syndicated series, The Fulton Sheen Program. Running until 1968, it was broadcast first in black-and-white and later in color. The format of the series was essentially the same as Life Is Worth Living.

=== International cassette tape ministry ===
In September 1974, Auxiliary Bishop Thomas William Lyons of Washington asked Sheen to speak at a retreat for diocesan priests at the Loyola Retreat House in Faulkner, Maryland. Sheen's talks were recorded on reel-to-reel tape.

Sheen requested the recorded talks be produced for distribution. This was the first production of a worldwide cassette tape ministry called Ministr-O-Media, a nonprofit company that operated on the grounds of St. Joseph's Parish in Pomfret, Maryland. The retreat album was Renewal and Reconciliation and included nine 60-minute audiotapes.

=== Evangelization ===
According to a 1952 article in Time Magazine, Sheen was responsible for converting to Catholicism the writer Heywood Broun, the politician Clare Boothe Luce, the automaker Henry Ford II, the writer Louis F. Budenz, the union organizer Bella Dodd, the theatrical designer Jo Mielziner and the violinist and composer Fritz Kreisler. Each conversion process took an average of 25 hours of lessons, and reportedly more than 95% of his students in private instruction were baptized.

=== Falling-out with Cardinal Spellman ===
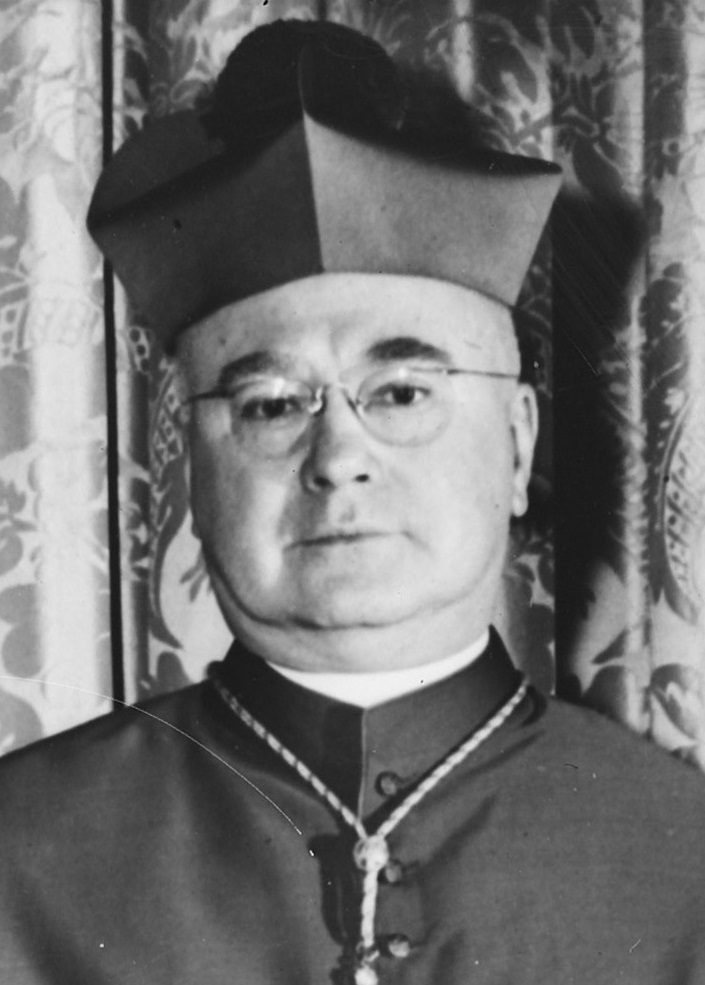
Cardinal Spellman in 1946

In the foreword of the 2008 edition of Sheen's autobiography, Treasure in Clay: The Autobiography of Fulton J. Sheen, the journalist Raymond Arroyo explains why Sheen ended Life Is Worth Living. Arroyo wrote that "It is widely believed that Cardinal Francis Spellman drove Sheen off the air."

"In the late 1950s, the government donated millions of dollars' worth of powdered milk to the New York Archdiocese. In turn, Cardinal Spellman handed that milk over to the Society for the Propagation of the Faith to distribute to the poor of the world. On at least one occasion, he demanded that the director of the Society, Bishop Sheen, pay the Archdiocese for the donated milk. He wanted millions of dollars. Despite Cardinal Spellman's considerable powers of persuasion and influence in Rome, Sheen refused."

Sheen pleaded his case about the funds directly to Pope Pius XII, who sided with him. Spellman later confronted Sheen and stated, "I will get even with you. It may take six months or ten years, but everyone will know what you are like." Besides being pressured to leave television, Sheen also "found himself unwelcome in the churches of New York City. Spellman canceled Sheen's annual Good Friday sermons at St. Patrick's Cathedral and discouraged clergy from socializing with him." In 1966, Spellman allegedly persuaded Pope Paul VI to appoint Sheen as bishop of Rochester and terminate his leadership at the Society for the Propagation of the Faith. Sheen never talked about the quarrel with Spellman. In his autobiography, Sheen even went so far as to praise the cardinal.

== Later years ==
On October 15, 1969, one month after celebrating his 50th anniversary as a priest, Sheen resigned as bishop of Rochester. Pope Paul VI then appointed him as archbishop of the titular see of Newport, Wales. The ceremonial position allowed Sheen to devote more time to his extensive writing. During his lifetime, Sheen wrote 73 books and numerous articles and columns.

The actor Ramón Gerard Antonio Estévez adopted the stage name of Martin Sheen partly in admiration of the bishop.

On October 2, 1979, two months before Sheen's death, Pope John Paul II visited St. Patrick's Cathedral during his papal visit to the United States. During the ceremony, the pope embraced Sheen and said, "You have written and spoken well of the Lord Jesus Christ. You are a loyal son of the Church."

== Death and legacy ==
Beginning in 1977, Sheen "underwent a series of surgeries that sapped his strength and even made preaching difficult." Throughout that time, he continued to work on his autobiography, parts of which "were recited from his sickbed as he clutched a crucifix." Soon after that, Sheen underwent open-heart surgery at Lenox Hill Hospital in Manhattan.

Sheen died on December 9, 1979, in his private chapel while praying before the Blessed Sacrament. He was interred in the crypt of St. Patrick's Cathedral near the deceased archbishops of New York. In 2019, after a long legal battle, the archdiocese transferred Sheen's remains to the Diocese of Peoria, which re-interred them in the Cathedral of St. Mary in Peoria.

== Museums and archives ==
- The official repository of Sheen's papers, television programs, and other materials is at St. Bernard's School of Theology and Ministry in Rochester.
- The Fulton J. Sheen Museum in Peoria houses the largest set of Sheen's personal items in five collections. It is operated by the Diocese of Peoria.
- The Archbishop Fulton John Sheen Spiritual Center is located in El Paso, Illinois. The museum contains more Sheen artifacts.
- The Sheen Center for Thought & Culture in Lower Manhattan is named after him.
- Sheen frequently celebrated Mass at Saint Agnes Church, in Midtown Manhattan. On October 7, 1980, New York Mayor Ed Koch renamed East 43rd Street in front of Saint Agnes as "Archbishop Fulton J. Sheen Place".

== Cause for canonization ==
The Archbishop Fulton J. Sheen Foundation was formed in 1998 by Gregory J. Ladd and Lawrence F. Hickey to spread information about Sheen's life. The foundation approached Cardinal John O'Connor of the Archdiocese of New York for permission to commence the process of his cause, which was under the authority of the Diocese of Peoria.

In 2002, Sheen's cause for canonization was opened by Bishop Daniel R. Jenky of Peoria. From then on, Sheen was referred to as a "Servant of God". In February 2008, Sheen's archives were sealed at a ceremony during a special Mass at the Cathedral of Saint Mary of the Immaculate Conception in Peoria. In 2009, the diocesan phase of the investigation ended and the records were sent to the Congregation for the Causes of Saints at the Vatican.

On June 28, 2012, the Vatican recognized Sheen's life as one of heroic virtue, a major step towards eventual beatification. From then on, Sheen was titled Venerable. According to the Catholic News Service and The Catholic Post (the newspaper of the Peoria Diocese), the case of a newborn boy who had no discernible pulse for 61 minutes, who was about to be declared dead at OSF Saint Francis Medical Center in Peoria, Illinois, as a stillborn infant, and yet lived to be healthy without physical or mental impairment, was in the preliminary stages of being investigated as the possible miracle needed for Sheen's potential beatification. If the miracle is approved at the diocesan level and then by the Congregation for the Causes of Saints at the Vatican, by being both medically unexplainable and directly attributable theologically to Sheen's intercession, according to expert panels in both subject areas, beatification may proceed. Another such miracle would be required for him to be considered for canonization.

On September 7, 2011, a tribunal of inquiry was sworn in to investigate the alleged healing. During a special Mass on December 11, 2011, at St. Mary's Cathedral in Peoria, the documentation gathered by the tribunal over nearly three months was boxed and sealed. It was then shipped to the Vatican for consideration by the Congregation for the Causes of Saints, concluding the diocesan tribunal's work.

=== Transfer of remains ===
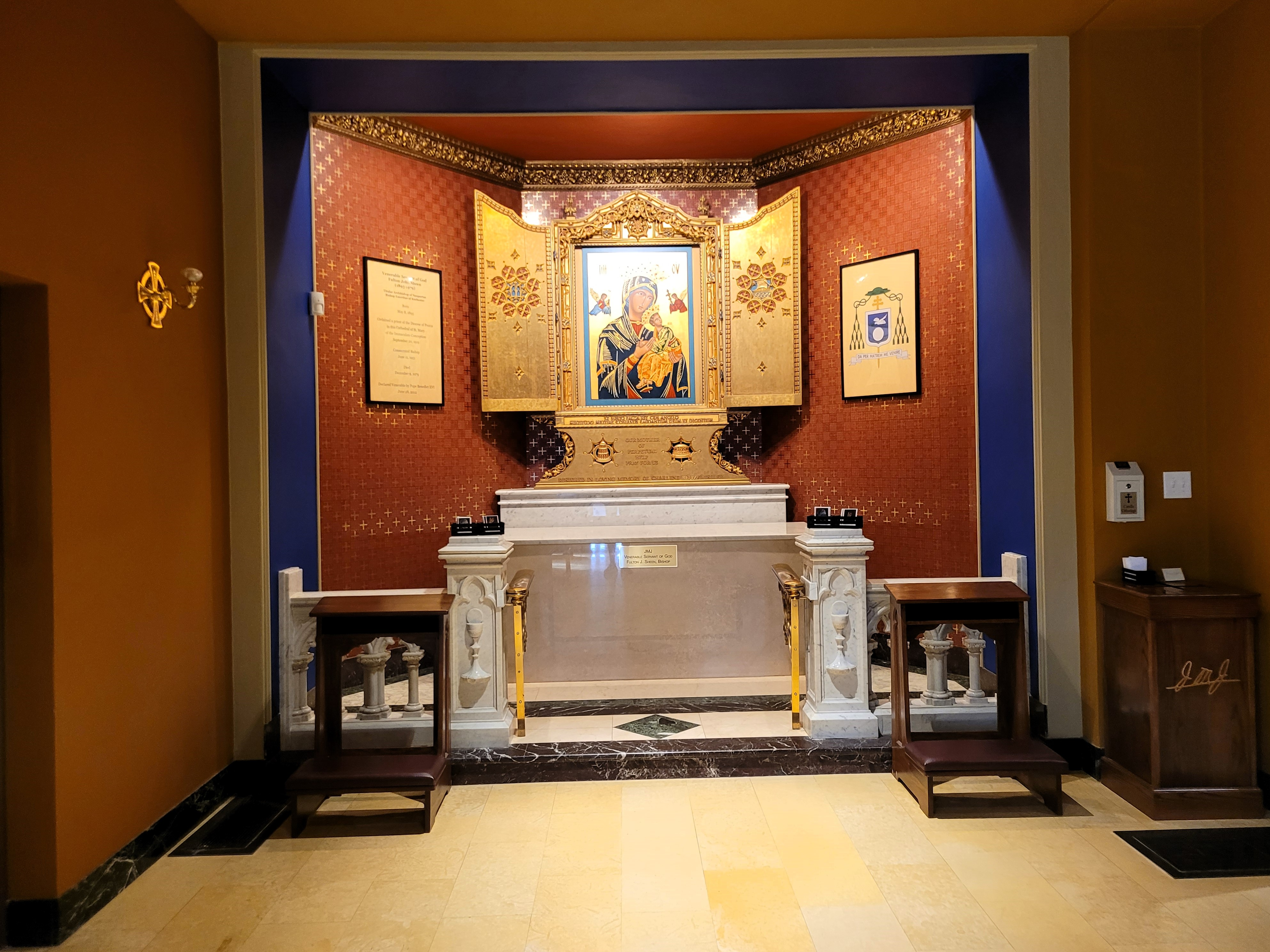
Sheen's tomb at St. Mary's Cathedral in Peoria, Illinois

In September 2014, the canonization cause was suspended because of a disagreement with the Archdiocese of New York concerning the transfer of Sheen's remains to the Diocese of Peoria. In a press release on June 14, 2016, it was announced that Sheen's surviving family petitioned the New York Supreme Court to allow the transfer of Sheen's remains to Peoria. The press release stated that "on several occasions, the Archdiocese [of New York] has declared its desire to cooperate with the wishes of the family."

In an action brought in New York Supreme Court in November 2016, Justice Arlene P. Bluth ordered the Archdiocese of New York to grant permission to disinter Sheen's body. The court ruled that the archdiocese's objection that Sheen would not want the disinterment was without factual basis. Given that his elevation to sainthood was being blocked, the court found the family had sufficient justification for moving his body.

In February 2018, the New York State Appellate Division overturned Bluth's decision and ordered an evidentiary hearing be held as to whether moving Sheen's body would be consistent with his wishes. The court noted that,

"it is unclear if Archbishop Sheen's direction in his will to be buried in 'Calvary Cemetery, the official cemetery of the Archdiocese of New York' evinces an express intention to remain buried in the Archdiocese of New York, or was merely a descriptive term for Calvary Cemetery."

In June 2018, after re-examining the case and holding the evidentiary hearing, Bluth affirmed her earlier ruling. The archdiocese allowed Peoria to begin the work on his cause for canonization, which eventually would have required at the least a collection of his relics. When the casket was opened, Sheen’s remains had fully skeletonized and his burial vestments had disintegrated.

The archdiocese announced on June 9, 2019, that it was officially giving up the fight to keep Sheen's remains at St. Patrick's Cathedral. On June 27, 2019, the remains were transferred to St. Mary's Cathedral in Peoria.

=== Beatification ===
The Mass for the Beatification of Blessed Fulton J. Sheen, 2026

On July 6, 2019, the Congregation for the Causes of Saints promulgated the decree approving Sheen's miracle needed for beatification. The miracle involved the unexplained recovery of James Fulton Engstrom, a boy stillborn in September 2010 to Bonnie and Travis Engstrom of the town of Goodfield, near Peoria. Engstrom's parents prayed for the intercession of Sheen for their son's recovery. Pope Francis approved the miracle, and Sheen was scheduled for beatification on December 21, 2019, at the Cathedral of St. Mary in Peoria.

On December 3, 2019, the Diocese of Peoria announced that the Vatican had postponed Sheen's beatification. Salvatore Matano, the bishop of Rochester, had expressed concern that Sheen's alleged posting of a priest who had been named in a 1963 sexual misconduct case might be cited unfavorably in a report from New York State Attorney General Letitia James. The Diocese of Peoria countered that the priest had been assigned not by Sheen but by his successor, and that Sheen's involvement in the matter had already been "thoroughly examined" and that he had been "exonerated" and "never put children in harm's way."

In March 2026, it was announced that his beatification would occur on September 24, 2026, in St. Louis, Missouri, presided over by Cardinal Luis Antonio Tagle. James Fulton Engstrom, healed by Sheen's intercession, attended the ceremony with his family and presented a relic of Sheen's lower jaw and teeth.

Cardinal Luis Tagle at the Beatification of Blessed Fulton J. Sheen, 2026

Sheen was beatified by Tagle, who represented Pope Leo XIV, on September 24, 2026 at the The Dome at America’s Center in St. Louis. That morning, United States President Donald Trump published a message in honor of the occasion. A Byzantine divine liturgy was celebrated to commemorate the event at Peoria's Cathedral of Saint Mary of the Immaculate Conception.

== Selected bibliography ==
- God and Intelligence in Modern Philosophy (1925, Longmans, Green, and Co.)
- The Seven Last Words (1933, The Century Co.)
- Philosophy of Science (1934, Bruce Publishing Co.)
- The Eternal Galilean (1934, Appleton-Century-Crofts)
- The Mystical Body of Christ (1935, Sheed and Ward)
- Calvary and the Mass (1936, P. J. Kenedy & Sons)
- The Cross and the Beatitudes (1937, P. J. Kenedy & Sons)
- The Armor of God: Reflections and Prayers for Wartime(1943, P. J. Kenedy and Sons). Reprinted as Fulton Sheen Wartime Prayer Book (2005, Sophia Institute)
- Seven Words of Jesus and Mary (1945, P. J. Kenedy & Sons)
- Communism and the Conscience of the West (1948, Bobbs-Merrill)
- Peace of Soul (1949, McGraw–Hill)
- Three to Get Married (1951, Appleton-Century-Crofts)
- The World's First Love (1952, McGraw-Hill)
- Life Is Worth Living Series 1–5 (1953–1957, McGraw–Hill)
- Way to Happiness (1953, Maco Magazine)
- Way to Inner Peace (1955, Garden City Books)
- Life of Christ (1958, McGraw–Hill)
- Missions and the World Crisis (1963, Bruce Publishing Co.)
- The Power of Love (1965, Simon & Schuster)
- Footprints in a Darkened Forest (1967, Meredith Press)
- Lenten and Easter Inspirations (1967, Maco Ecumenical Books)
- Treasure in Clay: The Autobiography of Fulton J. Sheen (1980, Doubleday & Co.)
- Finding True Happiness (2014, Dynamic Catholic)
- Your Life Is Worth Living: 50 Lessons to Deepen Your Faith, Foreword by Bishop Robert Barron (2019, Image Catholic Books)

Catholic Church titles
New title Titular see erected	— TITULAR — Archbishop of Newport, Wales; 1969–1979	Succeeded by Howard G. Tripp
Preceded by James E. Kearney	Archbishop-Bishop of Rochester; 1966–1969	Succeeded by Joseph Lloyd Hogan
Preceded by –	Auxiliary Bishop of New York; 1951–1966	Succeeded by –
New title Titular see erected	— TITULAR — Bishop of Caesariana; 1951–1966	Succeeded by Angelo Felici
