= James E. Kearney =

American prelate

His Excellency, The Most Reverend James Edward Kearney
- Bishop of Rochester; Titular Bishop of Tabaicara
- Diocese: Diocese of Rochester
- In office: November 11, 1937 to October 21, 1966
- Predecessor: Edward Mooney
- Successor: Fulton J. Sheen
- Previous posts: Bishop of Salt Lake (1932–1937)

Orders
- Ordination: September 19, 1908 by Thomas Cusack
- Consecration: October 28, 1932 by Patrick Hayes

Personal details
- Born: October 28, 1884 Red Oak, Iowa, US
- Died: January 12, 1977 (aged 92) Rochester, New York, US
- Denomination: Roman Catholic
- Education: Columbia University; St. Joseph's Seminary; Catholic University of America
- Motto: In te Domine speravi (In you Lord, I have hoped)

James Edward Kearney (October 28, 1884 – January 12, 1977) was an American prelate of the Roman Catholic Church. He served as bishop of the Diocese of Salt Lake in Utah (1932–1937) and bishop of the Diocese of Rochester in New York State (1937–1966).

== Biography ==
=== Early life ===
James Kearney was born on October 28, 1884, in Red Oak, Iowa, the second of the three sons of William Patrick and Rosina (née O'Doherty) Kearney. His parents were immigrants from County Donegal in Ireland. In 1886, the family moved to New York City, where his father worked selling furniture. Kearney received his early education at Public School No. 27 in Manhattan, since there was no parochial school at his home parish, St. Agnes.

Kearney graduated from DeWitt Clinton High School in the Bronx in 1901. He then attended the Teachers College of Columbia University in Manhattan, earning a Regents license to teach in New York State. In 1903, Kearney began studying for the priesthood at St. Joseph's Seminary in Yonkers, New York. He was sent in 1908 to complete his theological studies at the Catholic University of America in Washington, D.C.

=== Priesthood ===
Kearney was ordained to the priesthood for the Archdiocese of New York by Bishop Thomas Cusack on September 19, 1908 in New York City. He earned a Licentiate of Sacred Theology from Catholic University in 1909. Following his return to New York City, the archdiocese assigned Kearney as a curate at St. Cecilia's Parish in Manhattan, remaining there until 1928. In addition to his pastoral duties, Kearney taught at Cathedral College in Queens, New York.

Kearney served as the first pastor of St. Francis Xavier's Parish in the Bronx from 1928 to 1932 and founded the parish school there in 1929. During his tenure at St. Francis Xavier, he also served as professor of religion at Our Lady of Good Counsel College, an academy for girls in White Plains, New York, and as superintendent of parochial schools in the Bronx.

=== Bishop of Salt Lake ===
On July 1, 1932, Kearney was appointed the fourth bishop of Salt Lake by Pope Pius XI. He received his episcopal consecration on October 28, 1932, from Cardinal Patrick Hayes, with Bishops John Mitty and John Dunn serving as co-consecrators, at St. Patrick's Cathedral in Manhattan His installation took place at the Cathedral of the Madeleine in Salt Lake City on November 24, 1932.

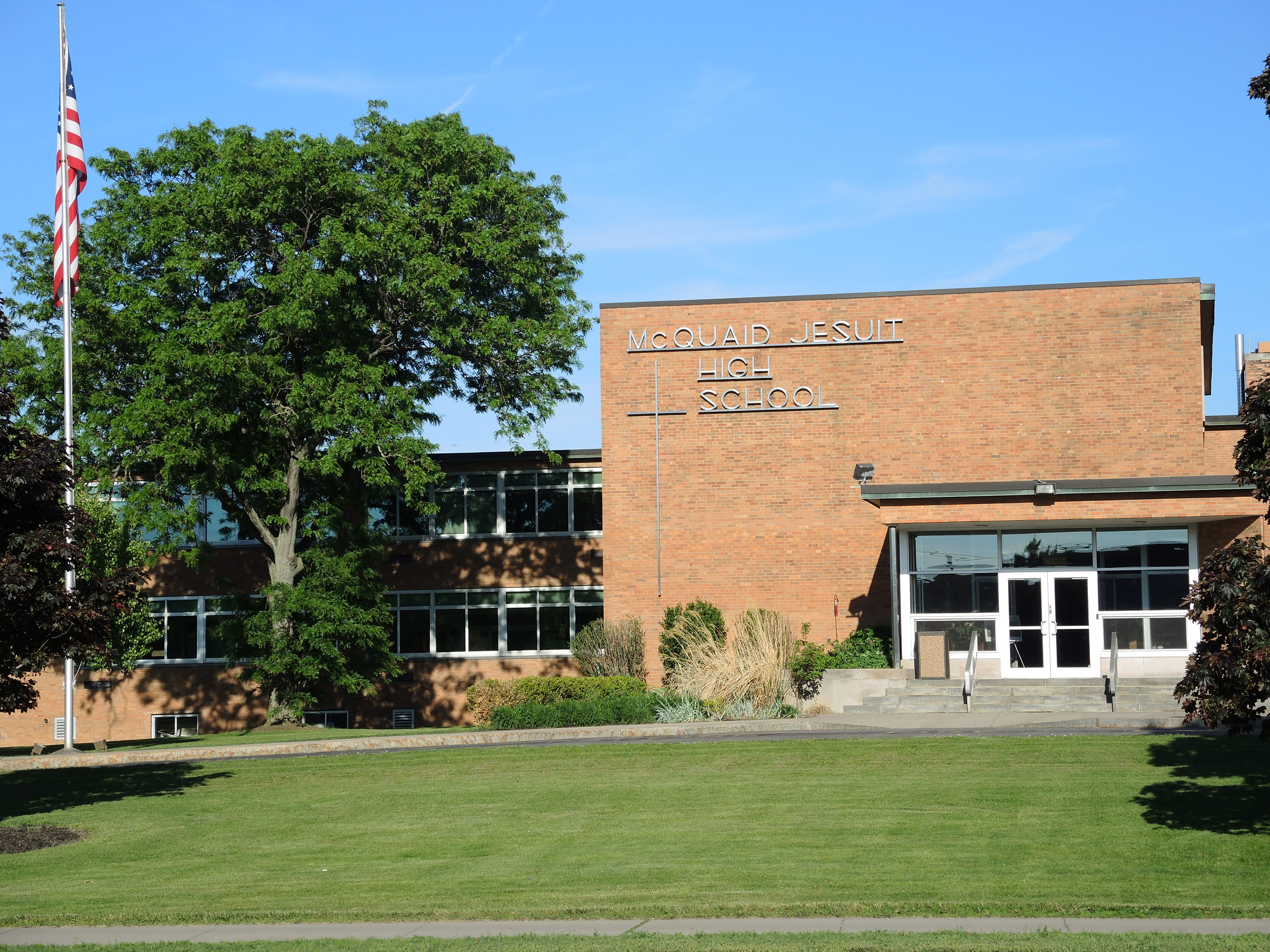
McQuaid Jesuit High School, Brighton, New York (2014)

=== Bishop of Rochester ===
Following the appointment of Bishop Edward Mooney to the Archdiocese of Detroit, Kearney was appointed the fifth bishop of Rochester on October 21, 1937. He was installed on November 11, 1937. During his 29-year tenure, the number of Catholics in the diocese rose from 223,657 to 361,790; the parishes from 129 to 155; the priests from 289 to 371; and the parochial schools from 72 to 99.

Kearney attended all four sessions of the Second Vatican Council in Rome between 1962 and 1965. He also served as state chaplain for the Knights of Columbus and moderator of the Newman Club Federation. Kearney also did much of the original planning that led to the foundation of McQuaid Jesuit High School in Brighton, New York.

=== Retirement and legacy ===
On October 21, 1966, Pope Paul VI accepted Kearney's resignation as bishop of Rochester and appointed him as titular bishop of Tabaicara. He resigned his titular see on January 18, 1971. James Kearney died on January 12, 1977, at St. Ann's Home in Rochester, at age 92. The following buildings or schools are named after him:

- Bishop Kearney High School in Irondequoit, New York
- Kearney Residence Hall at Nazareth College in Pittsford, New York
- Kearney Hall at Saint John Fisher College in Pittsford is named for his mother.

== Viewpoints ==
=== Politics ===
In 1936, Kearney spoke before the New York chapter of the Knights of Columbus in Manhattan, urging them to fight communism and saying,

"The spirit of Christ has been driven out of one organization after another...When statesmen meet no thought of God or representative of God is in their council."

In February 1943, Kearney spoke before the Newman Club Federation at the Waldorf-Astoria Hotel in Manhattan. He declared,

"The spirit of Christianity can dictate a lasting peace, but secularism, exploitation or totalitarianism cannot, whether of Nazi, Communist or Fascist variety."

=== Popular culture ===
Kearney in 1937 spoke before a group at the Convent of Our Lady of the Cenacle in Manhattan. In his sermon, he condemned what he termed the "mad craze for entertainment" in modern society, including picture magazines. He stated that man had brought evil upon himself because he did not "pause to take stock of his relationship with God."

In 1947, Kearney denounced the 1947 film Forever Amber as a "glorification of immorality and licentiousness." He encouraged Catholics to boycott it.

=== Education ===
In 1937, speaking at Our Lady of Good Counsel Kearney accused American colleges of teaching their students "cynical precepts" and causing them to distrust the "perfect lessons they learned at their mother's knee." He also said,

"Those who declare it doesn't make any difference what we believe in an attempt to attain religious harmony will fail. For religious intolerance was created...by people who sold dogmatic teaching short."

== Notes ==
Catholic Church titles
Preceded by John Joseph Mitty	Bishop of Salt Lake City; 1932–1937	Succeeded by Duane Garrison Hunt
Preceded by Edward Mooney	Bishop of Rochester; 1937–1966	Succeeded by Fulton J. Sheen
