= Luigi Raimondi =

Italian cardinal

His Eminence Luigi Raimondi
- Prefect of the Congregation for the Causes of Saints
- Church: Catholic Church
- Appointed: 21 March 1973
- Term ended: 24 June 1975
- Predecessor: Paolo Bertoli
- Successor: Corrado Bafile
- Other post: Cardinal-Deacon of Santi Biagio e Carlo ai Catinari (1973–75)
- Previous posts: Apostolic Nuncio to Haiti (1953–56); Titular Archbishop of Tarsus (1953–73); Apostolic Delegate to Mexico (1956–67); Apostolic Delegate to the United States of America (1967–73)

Orders
- Ordination: 6 June 1936 by Lorenzo Del Ponte
- Consecration: 31 January 1954 by Adeodato Giovanni Piazza
- Created cardinal: 5 March 1973 by Pope Paul VI
- Rank: Cardinal-deacon

Personal details
- Born: Luigi Raimondi; 25 October 1912 Acqui-Lussito, Acqui, Kingdom of Italy
- Died: 24 June 1975 (aged 62) Vatican City
- Parents: Giovanni Raimondi; Maria Giacchero
- Education: Pontifical Lateran University; Pontifical Ecclesiastical Academy
- Motto: Fructus lucis bonitas

Styles of Luigi Raimondi
- Reference style: His Eminence
- Spoken style: Your Eminence
- Informal style: Cardinal
- See: Tarsus (titular see)

Luigi Raimondi (25 October 1912 – 24 June 1975) was an Italian prelate of the Catholic Church. He served as prefect of the Vatican's Congregation for the Causes of Saints from his elevation to the cardinalate by Pope Paul VI in 1973 until his death two years later.

Raimondi also served as the Apostolic Delegate to the United States from 1967 until his appointment to the Vatican post in Rome.

== Biography ==
Raimondi was born in Lussito, Acqui, to Giovanni Raimondi and his wife Maria Giacchero. He attended the seminary in Acqui before being ordained to the priesthood by Bishop Lorenzo Del Ponte on 6 June 1936. Raimondi then furthered his studies in Rome at the Pontifical Lateran University. He was summoned to the elite Pontifical Ecclesiastical Academy where he studied diplomacy. From 1938 to 1942, Raimondi was secretary of the Guatemalan nunciature, during which time he was raised to the rank of a Privy Chamberlain of His Holiness on 3 March 1939. He then served as auditor of the Apostolic Delegation to the United States until 1949. Within the internunciature to India, Raimondi was counselor and chargé d'affaires from 1949 to 1953. He was named a Domestic Prelate of His Holiness on 5 March 1951, and an official of the Vatican Secretariat of State in 1953.

On 24 December 1953, Raimondi was appointed Titular Archbishop of Tarsus and Nuncio to Haiti, and Apostolic Delegate to the British and French West Indies. He received his episcopal consecration on 31 January 1954 from Cardinal Adeodato Giovanni Piazza, OCD, with Archbishop Antonio Samoré and Bishop Giuseppe Dell'Olmo serving as co-consecrators, in the church of San Carlo al Corso. Raimondi was later named Apostolic Delegate to Mexico on 15 December 1956. He attended the Second Vatican Council from 1962 to 1965. He was made Apostolic Delegate to the United States on 30 June 1967.

Pope Paul VI created him Cardinal-Deacon of Ss. Biagio e Carlo ai Catinari in the consistory of 5 March 1973, and appointed him prefect of the Sacred Congregation for the Causes of Saints on the following 21 March. Cardinal Raimondi was once described as "a liberal who knows his limitations" and "a likable man who wants to be liked".

Raimondi died from a heart attack in Vatican City, at age 62. He is buried in his family's plot in Acqui.

| Preceded by Francesco Lardone | Apostolic Nuncio to Haiti; 1953–1956 | Succeeded by Domenico Enrici |
| Preceded by Guglielmo Piani, SDB | Apostolic Delegate to Mexico; 1956–1967 | Succeeded by Guido Del Mestri |
| Preceded by Egidio Vagnozzi | Apostolic Delegate to the United States; 1967–1973 | Succeeded by Jean Jadot |
| Preceded by Paolo Bertoli | Prefect of the Sacred Congregation for the Causes of Saints; 1973–1975 | Succeeded by Corrado Bafile |
