= Saint George Roman Catholic Lithuanian Church =

Church in Rochester, New York

Coordinates: 43°10′27″N 77°35′59″W

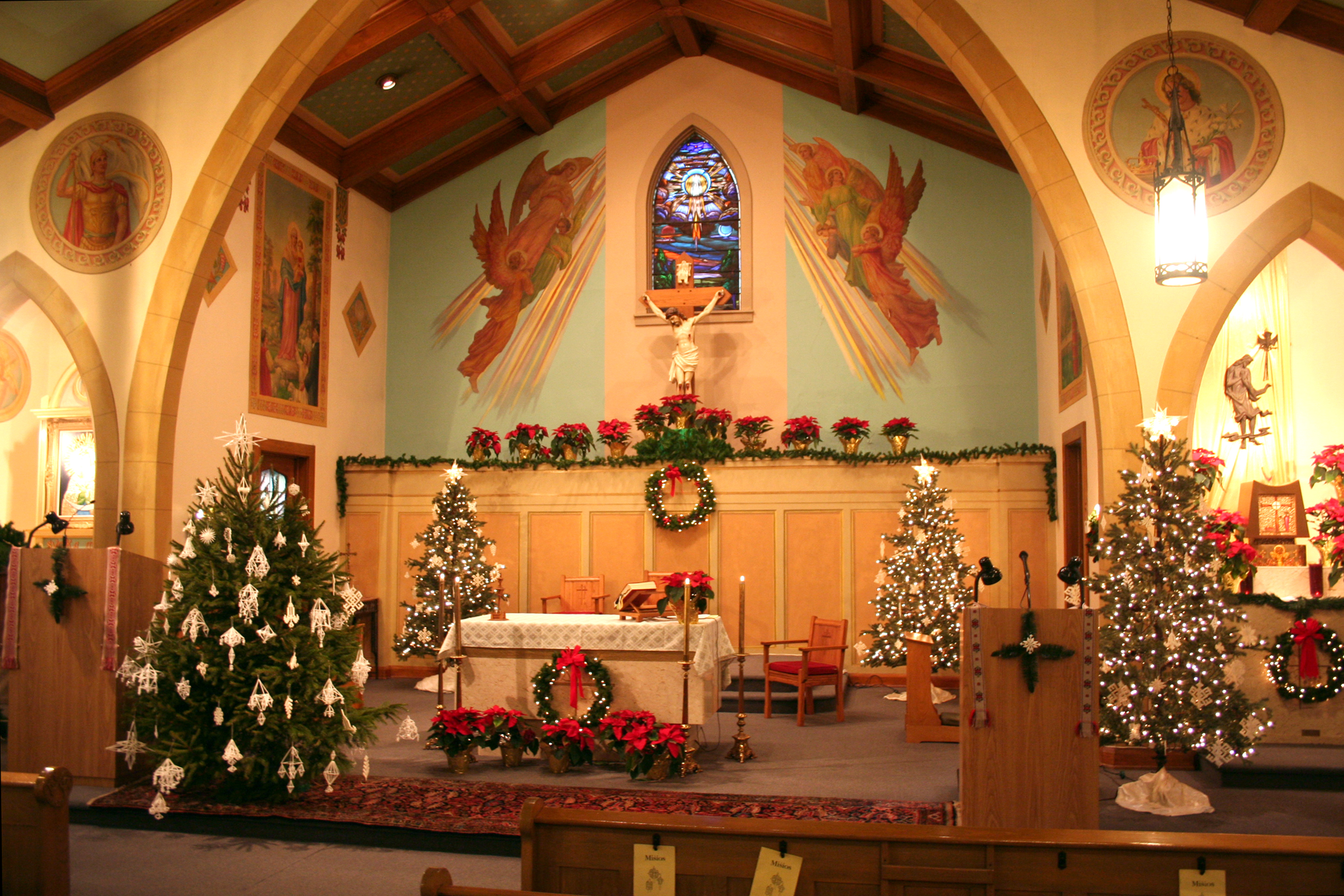
Saint George Roman Catholic Lithuanian Church, Rochester, NY, US

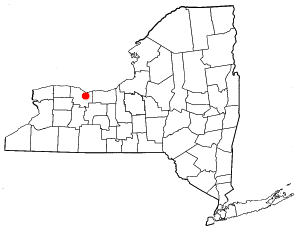
Map of Rochester, NY, US

Saint George Roman Catholic Lithuanian Church was incorporated in Rochester, New York, on January 23, 1908 and was the main gathering place for the Lithuanian community of all of western New York state, including of Buffalo, New York, which did not have a Lithuanian church. The centennial celebrations took place on October 10–12, 2008.

== Founding ==
Lithuanians began to emigrate to the United States at the end of the 19th century. There is no precise data about the first Lithuanians in Rochester. Antanas Sabalis in his 1983 book about St. George's Roman Catholic Lithuanian Parish and the Rochester Lithuanians quotes Mykolas Ventis remembering that the first Lithuanians came to Rochester about 1890. By the end of 1905, there were some 400 Lithuanians in Rochester, many of them young men having escaped the hardships of the coal mines of Pennsylvania. Visiting Lithuanian priests from other cities held Mass in Lithuanian in the Holy Redeemer Church or the parish's Concordia Hall. German Pastor Jacob Staub encouraged local Lithuanian men to seek a permanent Lithuanian priest. Before the Easter in 1905, they invited Father Kazimieras Urbonavičius to come. To appear more favorably, they also organized the Saints Peter and Paul Society with 28 initial members.

It was at the September 9, 1906, meeting of the Saints Peter and Paul Society that Adomas Butrimas proposed the idea of establishing a Lithuanian Roman Catholic Parish. All 200 members in attendance agreed. At the October 14 meeting of the Saints Peter and Paul Society, 134 members pledged their support and decided that members would go house-to-house collecting funds for the new parish. At the next meeting on November 13, the members settled on the name of Saint George, the Martyr, for their new parish. At the October 14 meeting 461 potential parishioners were enrolled; by April 1909 there were 690.

On January 23, 1908, St. George's Roman Catholic Church (Lithuanians) was incorporated.

== Building construction ==
At the April 14, 1907, parish meeting the committee to oversee the construction of the church and parish hall was named. Their proposal to buy the vacant land between Hudson, Weeger, and Dudley Streets was readily accepted. Each person at the meeting pledged an initial 25 dollar donation. At the March 8, 1908, parish meeting $25,000 was allocated to build a stone church. Although at first there were many stumbling blocks because of the hard financial situation of the time, Bishop Thomas Hickey dedicated the new church-hall-school building, costing about $18,000, on December 11, 1910.

The success of the building project was in most part due to the energy of Father Juozas Kasakaitis, who became the first pastor of St. George Church after finishing his studies at Saint Bernard's Seminary in spring 1910. In 1925 a two-story rectory was finished. By January 1927, it became clear to all members that the parish was ready to build a church which would be separate from the hall and school. When Pastor Kasakaitis died in 1930, the new Pastor, Jonas Bakšys, took on the building project of the new church. Finally, on August 11, 1935, the new church, built to seat 400 members, was dedicated with great celebrations by Archbishop Edward Mooney and Bishop Teofilius Matulionis. The old church was converted to a parish hall and opened with a concert and play on November 17, 1935.

== Parish school ==
In 1929 a primary school was opened to house four grades. Father Jonas Baksys later expanded it to eight grades and invited Lithuanian Franciscan Sisters from Pittsburgh, Pennsylvania, to staff it. The parish built them a convent on the church grounds. By 1930 the school had grown to 164 students, and the first graduating class included the present Pastor of Saint George, Father Dominic Mockevičius. The school closed in 1965.

== Parish organizations ==
The parish became a home of many organizations. The Sts. Peter and Paul Society, whose members took the initiative to build the church, was incorporated in 1905 and was disbanded by the 1990s. Various other societies were established: the Holy Mary Society (1908–1976), the Fraternity of Saint George the Soldier (1908–1965), Chapter 103 of the Lithuanian Roman Catholic Alliance of America (1908–1982), Saint Cecilia's Choir (1911–1940s), Chapter 93 of Knights of Lithuania (1917–1954), and others. The Grand Duke Gediminas Club, established in 1903, was the first and most controversial society. By 1912 they already had a building with a bar on the first floor and facilities for meetings on the second floor. The organization was left-leaning and did not participate in parish activities or support Lithuanian independence. In 1967 the association had 137 members. The parish supported Lithuania's goals of independence. For example, during the Lithuanian Days in 1916 Tautos Fondas raised $1,600 for the independence movement; in March 1918, 13 delegates representing Saint George parish and six other organizations took part in the Lithuanian Convention at New York's Madison Square Garden asking President Woodrow Wilson to recognize Lithuania's independence.

== Parish priests ==
At the beginning Rochester's Lithuanians were served by priests from other towns. During the parish incorporation, the Rector was Father Vincentas Vizgirda, who signed the parish incorporation document, but in May returned to Wilkes-Barre, Pennsylvania, and Father Juozas Krasnickas, who left in October. The professors of Saint Bernard's Seminary then took the parish under their care. The most frequent guests were Father J. F. Goggin, who officiated at Mass, and Seminarian Juozas Kasakaitis, who gave the sermons in Lithuanian. When Father Kasakaitis graduated in spring 1909, he was assigned as the first pastor of Saint George Roman Catholic Lithuanian Church. Kasakaitis died of cancer in 1930. He was replaced by Father Jonas Bakšys, alumni of Saint Bernard's Seminary, who worked in Hartford and Waterbury. Bakšys finished building the present Saint George's church and expanded the parish's grammar school to eight grades. Father Bakšys organized relief for the Lithuanian refugees of World War II: he organized clothing donations and raised $10,000 in June 1947 under the auspices of the local chapter of United Lithuanian Relief Fund. When immigration rules permitted Lithuanian refugees to come to the United States, Bakšys himself sponsored many families and found jobs for many of the new arrivals.

Because of failing health, Father Bakšys handed over the pastorate to Pranas Valukevičius in 1956. Valukevičius was born and raised in Rochester and worked the assistant parish priest in 1938–1950. During his term he remodeled the church, hall, and school. To make the parish financially more secure, he started the bingo games. He was also one of the founders in 1950 of the Lithuanian Radio Program, which is still in existence today. Before his death of cancer in 1972, Father Valukevičius worked to find a Lithuanian pastor. The Lithuanian Franciscan Fathers responded to his search and in 1972 took over the leadership of Saint George's Parish. Fathers Rafaelis Šakalys, Bernardinas Grauslys, and Augustinas Simanavičius presided over the parish only for a few months. Father Jonas Dyburys was appointed in 1973, but died of a heart attack in 1976.

He was replaced by father Justinas Vaškys, a distinguished personality. Having studied theology, philosophy, history, and pedagogy in Kaunas, Lithuania, and in Austria, in 1939 Vaškys was appointed Principal of the Franciscan High School in Kretinga, Lithuania. When in 1940 the Soviets occupied Lithuania, the Franciscan hierarchy sent Vaškys to America to find a place that would house the Lithuanian Franciscan Friars now scattered throughout the world. He found a place for a monastery in Kennebunk, Maine, which is still in existence. There, he was responsible for laying the foundations for the Lithuanian newspaper Darbininkas and the magazines Aidai and Šv. Pranciškaus Varpelis. Because of failing health, Father Vaškys had to resign as pastor in June 1991 and went to live in a nursing home, run by the Sisters of the Immaculate Conception of the Blessed Virgin Mary in Putnam, Connecticut, where he died in 1994. With him ended the Franciscan leadership at Saint George's.

The Diocese made Father Ralph Fraats the temporary administrator of Saint George. One year later, in 1992, brothers Charles and Dominic Mockevičius returned from retirement to serve Saint George's parishioners. They both had graduated from the Saint George's Grammar School, studied at Saint Andrew and Saint Bernard's Seminaries. In 1997 St. George's celebrated Charles' 80th Birthday and the 50th anniversary of his priesthood. Father Charles died in 2002. Father Dominic's 60th anniversary of priesthood was celebrated here in the summer of 2008. With help from the Honorary Consul of Lithuania Rimantas Česonis and Bishop Eugenijus Bartulis, Kazimieras Gražulis and Gintaras Antanas Jonikas came from Lithuania to assist Father Dominic.

=== Pastors ===
- 1910–1930 Juozas Kasakaitis
- 1930–1956 Jonas Bakšys
- 1956–1972 Pranas/Frank Valukevičius
- 1972 Rafaelis Šakalys
- 1972 Bernardinas Grauslys
- 1972–1973 Augustinas Simanavičius
- 1973–1976 Jonas Dyburys
- 1976–1991 Justinas Vaškys
- 1991–1992 Ralph Fraats
- 1992–1994 Kazimieras/Charles Mockevičius
- 1994–2010 Domininkas/Dominic Mockevičius

=== Assistant priests ===
- to 1910 Juozas Kasakaitis
- 1938–1950 Pranas/Frank Valukevičius
- 1950–1956 Domininkas/Dominic Mockevičius
- 1962–1965 Antanas Račaitis
- 1965–1971 Liudas Januška
- 1970s Antanas Petrauskas
- 1972–1973 Eugenijus Jurgutis
- 1976 Gabrielius Baltrušaitis
- 1980s Tadas Degutis
- 1994–2002 Kazimieras/Charles Mockevičius
- 2004–2006 Kazimieras Gražulis
- 1990, 2006–2009 Gintaras Antanas Jonikas

== Post-World War II parish organizations ==
In 1942 a Rochester Chapter of the Lithuanian-American Council (LAC) was established and merged with a chapter of the United Lithuanian Relief Fund of America in 1943. The chapter organized observances of the Lithuanian Independence Day, anti-Soviet demonstrations, cultural events, Lithuanian Days with car parades in the city, and raised funds for Lithuania's struggle for freedom and for needy Lithuanians. The chapter officers have, for a number of years, selected people for recognition and award of Lithuanian Foundation medals for achievement in the field of culture. Beginning in 1971, ten such awards were bestowed. Especially during 1987–1994 their focus was on supporting the struggle for Lithuania's independence. Worthy of notice at that time was the walk on foot from Rochester to Washington, D.C., by activist Paulius Klimas to publicize the case of jailed Lithuanian dissident Petras Gražulis, who eventually regained his freedom and is now member of the Lithuanian Parliament. His brother, Rev. Kazimieras Gražulis, served as Rev. Dominic Mockevičius' assistant in 2004–2006. With the arrival of new immigrants the dearth of candidates was overcome and a new slate of officers elected in 2002. On their agenda, among other things, were efforts to support Lithuania's membership in NATO, and to participate in the long-term effort by the Eastman School of Music and the Episcopal Diocese to install at Christ Church a copy of the organ from Holy Ghost Church in Vilnius, Lithuania. (The inaugural concert of this organ took place in October 2008.)

The Rochester Lithuanian Choir (later known as Lithuanian Community Choir, Putinas) was established in 1949. The choir has sung at Mass and in concerts, at all North American Lithuanian Song Festivals as well as those in Lithuania in 1994, 1998 and 2002. 1949 also saw the start of a Lithuanian Folk Dance group. It debuted at the traditional Lithuanian Day at Schuetzen Park. Later the group was named Lazdynas (Hazel) while a spin-off veteran group was named Lazdyno Šaknys (Roots of Hazel). The group participated in folk dance festivals in North America as well as in Lithuania, including appearance in Vatican for the Pope in 1983. The last appearance for Lazdynas appears to have been the showing of its veterans group at the dance festival in Toronto in 2000. In 1984 a second Lithuanian folk dance group named Žilvinas appeared. The group performed in Atlanta in 1985 and at the Folk Dance Festival in Hamilton, Ontario, in 1988. The group disbanded in 1991.

Lithuanian Scouts and Ateitis (Future, a Catholic student organization) were established in 1949, a chapter of Ramovė (organization of Lithuanian Army veterans) and Lithuanian radio program Dainos Aidas (Echo of Song) were organized in 1950. First aired on February 16, 1950, Dainos Aidas still broadcasts at 9 AM every Sunday for a half-hour on 90.1 FM. The program was started on a commercial basis, but soon a Radio Club was organized for raising funds through dues and contributions. Dainos Aidas won the Lithuanian-American Community's Cultural Council's award for 2002. In 1951 members of Ateitis organized a Lithuanian book stall in the church hall. During 1951–1973, 10,323 books were sold. Members of Ateitis also launched a drama circle, which staged plays locally and in other cities like Philadelphia, New York, Cleveland, Toronto, Montreal. The youth group took one to the 3rd Drama Festival in Chicago in 1974. Music group Sutartinė performed from 1977 to 1981 in cities like Cleveland, Baltimore, Detroit, Toronto. After about eight years of performance, a pop music band Slibinas (Dragon) split up in 1977.

A Lithuanian Saturday school was established in 1961. Instruction was to take place Saturday mornings 32 weeks and subsequently ran all Saturday morning until after noon. The school, named for Mindaugas Tomonis, lasted until 1993. During its first 20 years the school graduated 56 students. In 2005 another Lithuanian school, The Edward Gervickas Lithuanian Heritage School, opened in Rochester. The school currently has 18 students, 4 to 15 years of age.

Baltų Vaikai (Children of the Balts) was organized in 2005 and currently has 28 members (22 adults and 6 children), mostly recently arrived immigrants. The goals of Baltų Vaikai are to foster Lithuanian culture, customs, and traditions. Since their beginning, Baltų Vaikai have organized many events of their own and helped other organizations with their events.

The Parish Council requested to organize a Parish Future Committee in fall 2005. The purpose was to assess the future of St. George Parish and make recommendations with regards to aging clergy, financial support, declining parish enrollment, deteriorating buildings. The committee was successful in securing the services of Father Gintaras Antanas Jonikas who arrived in Rochester in the summer of 2006 from Lithuania to assist Father Dominic Mockevicius. An outgrowth of the Parish Future Committee was the Lithuanian Heritage Society of Rochester, an umbrella organization with over 100 members. The Society's main purpose is to continue and promote Lithuanian culture and traditions in the Rochester area. One of its principal goals is to secure a facility that is separate from the St. George Parish buildings.

On June 21, 2010, the parish transitioned to Our Lady of Lourdes Church in Brighton, NY.
