= John Francis O'Hern =

American prelate (1874–1933)

His Excellency, The Most Reverend John Francis O'Hern
- Bishop of Rochester
- Diocese: Diocese of Rochester
- In office: January 4, 1929 – May 22, 1933
- Predecessor: Thomas Francis Hickey
- Successor: Edward Mooney

Orders
- Ordination: February 17, 1901 by Pietro Respighi
- Consecration: March 9, 1930 by Patrick Joseph Hayes

Personal details
- Born: June 4, 1874 Olean, New York, US
- Died: May 22, 1933 (aged 58) Rochester, New York, US
- Denomination: Roman Catholic
- Parents: Patrick and Ellen (née Casey) O'Hern
- Education: St. Andrew's Preparatory Seminary; St. Bernard's Seminary; Pontifical North American College; College of Propaganda

John Francis O'Hern (June 4, 1874 – May 22, 1933) was an American prelate of the Roman Catholic Church who served as bishop of the Diocese of Rochester in New York State from 1929 until his death in 1933.

== Biography ==
=== Early life ===
One of ten children, John O'Hern was born on June 4, 1874, in Olean, New York, to Patrick and Ellen (née Casey) O'Hern. Three of his brothers also entered the priesthood, and another served in the field staff of US Army General John J. Pershing during World War I. After graduating from Olean High School, John O'Hern attended St. Andrew's Preparatory Seminary and St. Bernard's Seminary, both in Rochester, New York.

In 1897, O'Hern was sent to Rome to reside at the Pontifical North American College in Rome, later earning a Doctor of Divinity degree from the College of Propaganda.

=== Priesthood ===
O'Hern was ordained a priest in Rome for the Diocese of Rochester by Cardinal Pietro Respighi in Rome on February 17, 1901. Upon his return to Rochester, the diocese assigned him as curate at Immaculate Conception Parish. He was later transferred to St. Patrick's Cathedral Parish in Rochester, where he became pastor in 1908. O'Hern was named pastor of Corpus Christi Parish in Rochester in 1921. Bishop Thomas Hickey named O'Hern as vicar general of the diocese in 1922.

=== Bishop of Rochester ===
On January 4, 1929, O'Hern was appointed the third bishop of Rochester by Pope Pius XI. He received his episcopal consecration at St. Patrick's Cathedral on March 9, 1929, from Cardinal Patrick Hayes, with Archbishop Edward Hanna and Bishop Thomas O'Reilly serving as co-consecrators. During his tenure as bishop, O'Hern worked toward establishing ecumenical ties with non-Catholics and promoting numerous associations of the laity. He supported the Community Chest and American Red Cross, and provided chaplains for Catholics attending secular colleges in the diocese.

O'Hern died in Rochester on May 22, 1933, at age 58.

Catholic Church titles
| Preceded by Thomas Francis Hickey | Bishop of Rochester; 1929–1933 | Succeeded by Edward Mooney |
