= Lietuvos skaučių seserija =

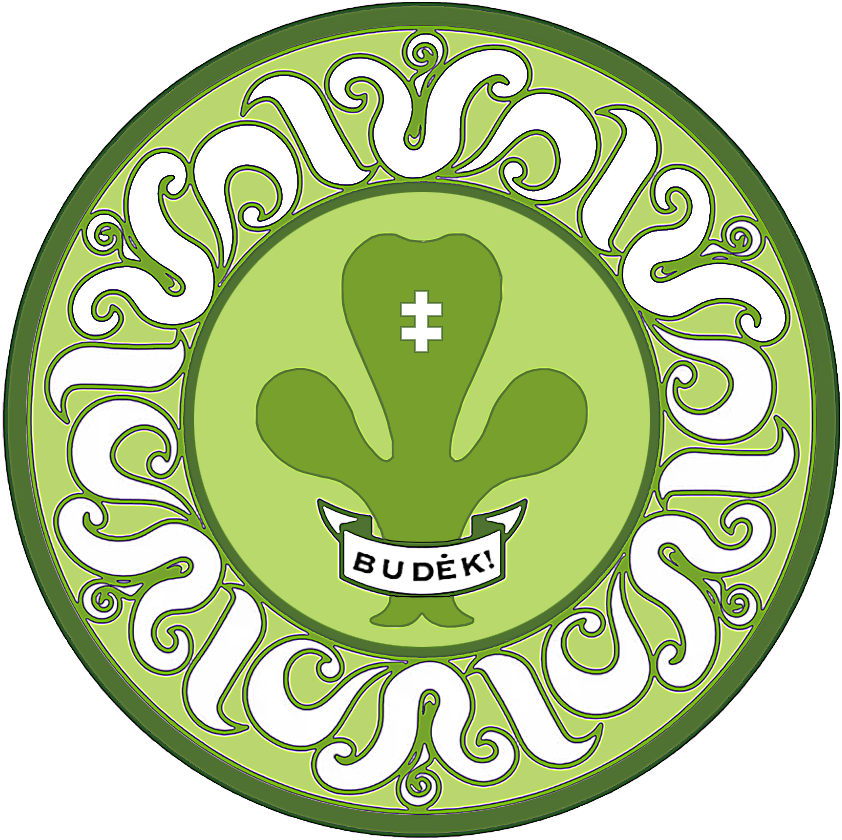
- The Lithuanian Girl Scouts
- Country: Lithuania
- Founded: 1989
- Membership: 742 (2012)
- Affiliation: World Association of Girl Guides and Girl Scouts

Lietuvos skaučių seserija (LSSes; Lithuanian Girl Guides) is a Guiding association in Lithuania. Guiding in Lithuania started in 1926, was banned by the Soviets in 1940 and restarted in 1990.

The association became an associate member of the World Association of Girl Guides and Girl Scouts (WAGGGS) in 2008. The girls-only association had 742 members in 2012.

After three years without contacts to the LSSes, the Europe Committee and the World Board of WAGGGS recommended a termination of membership in 2017. The respective motion was not carried during the 36th World Conference and LSSes retained its membership.

The organizations has strong ties to Lithuanian Scouts-in-Exile in the United States and Canada.

The Guide Motto is Budėk, translating as Be Prepared in Lithuanian.

The Guide emblem incorporates the Cross of Lorraine.

== See also ==
- Scouting in Lithuania
- Lietuvos Skautija
