= Thomas Francis Hickey (bishop) =

American prelate

His Excellency, The Most Reverend Thomas Francis Hickey
- Bishop of Rochester titular archbishop of Viminacium
- Diocese: Diocese of Rochester
- In office: May 24, 1905 to October 30, 1928
- Predecessor: Bernard John McQuaid
- Successor: John Francis O'Hern

Orders
- Ordination: March 25, 1884 by Bernard John McQuaid
- Consecration: May 24, 1905 by John Farley

Personal details
- Born: February 4, 1861 Rochester, New York US
- Died: December 10, 1940 (aged 79) Rochester, New York
- Denomination: Roman Catholic
- Education: St. John's Seminary; Fordham University; St. Joseph's Seminary

Thomas Francis Hickey (February 4, 1861 – December 10, 1940) was an American prelate of the Roman Catholic Church. He served as the second bishop of the Diocese of Rochester in New York (1909–1928). He was named titular archbishop of Viminacium in 1928

== Biography ==
=== Early life ===
Hickey was born in Rochester, New York on February 4, 1861, to Jeremiah and Margaret Hickey. He studied at St. John's Seminary and Fordham University, both in New York City, and at St. Joseph's Seminary in Troy New York.

=== Priesthood ===
Hickey was ordained to the priesthood for the Diocese of Rochester on March 25, 1884 by Bishop Bernard John McQuaid in Rochester, New York. After his ordination, the diocese assigned Hickey to pastoral positions in parishes in Geneva and Moravia, New York. Hickey then became chaplain of the New York State Industrial School in Rush, New York. McQuaid later appointed Hickey as rector of St. Patrick's Cathedral in Rochester.

=== Coadjutor Bishop and Bishop of Rochester ===
On February 18, 1905, Hickey was appointed as coadjutor bishop of the Diocese of Rochester and titular bishop of Berenice by Pope Pius X to assist McQuaid. He received his episcopal consecration at St. Patrick's Cathedral on May 24, 1905, from Cardinal John Farley, with McQuaid and Bishop Patrick Ludden serving as co-consecrators.

After McQuaid died on January 18, 1909, Hickey automatically succeeded him as bishop of Rochester. During his tenure, Hickey was a strong advocate of Catholic education, and established a catechetical program for Catholic children enrolled in public schools. He supported the apostolate to deaf persons and pioneered the work of Catholic Charities within the diocese He also helped establish an office to aid the bishops of New York State in lobbying the New York Legislature about their concerns. Hickey led the creation of the Aquinas Institute for Boys and Nazareth Academy for girls, both in Rochester. He also assisted in the founding of Nazareth College in Pittsford, New York.

=== Resignation and death ===
Hickey's resignation as bishop of Rochester was accepted by Pope Pius XI on October 30, 1928; the pope appointed him as titular archbishop of Viminacium on the same date.

Thomas Hickey died on December 10, 1940, in Rochester of what was termed a "toxic condition" at St. Mary's Hospital, at age 79.

Catholic Church titles
Preceded by Bernard John McQuaid	Bishop of Rochester; 1909–1928	Succeeded by John Francis O'Hern
