= Andrew Breen =

American Catholic Priest, theologian and author

A.E. (Andrew Edward) Breen (June 15, 1863 - September 10, 1938) was an American Catholic Priest, notable theologian and author. Rev. Breen was born in Amity, Allegany County, NY to David and Ellen Breen. He had an older brother, John Breen who was six years old at the time of Andrew's birth. Rev. Breen was ordained in Rome, May 27, 1893. He was rector of St. Patrick's Church, Mt. Morris, New York, Professor of Holy Scripture and Hebrew at Saint Bernard's Seminary, Rochester New York and at St Francis Seminary, St Francis, Wisconsin, US.

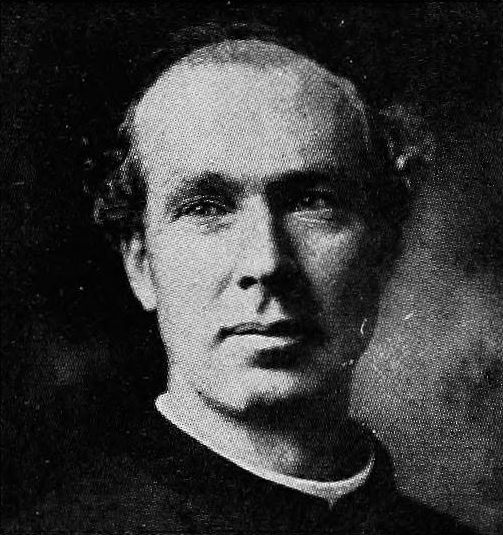
A.E. Breen

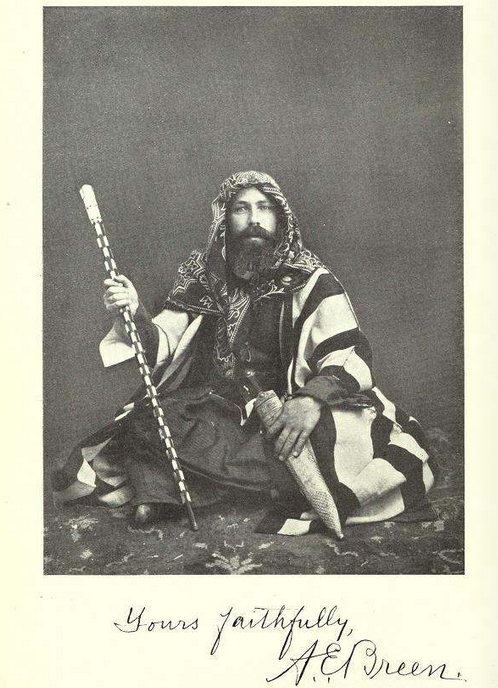
A.E. Breen from A diary of my life in the Holy Land

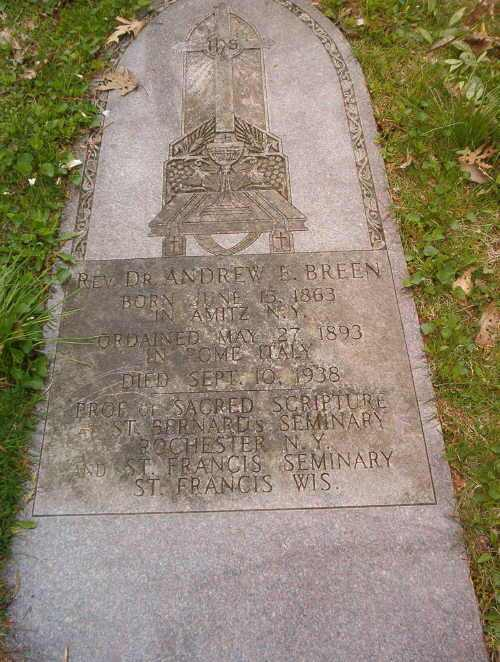
Grave of A.E. Breen

== Published works ==
- A general and critical introduction to the study of Holy Scripture (1897)
- A general introduction to the study of Holy Scripture, (1908)
- A harmonized exposition of the four Gospels (4 Volumes), (1899)
- A Diary of my Life in the Holy Land, (1906)
- A daughter of Mexico: a historical romance founded on documentary evidence, (1916)
- A compendious critical life of St. Thérèse of Lisieux, (1928)

Rev Breen contributed the following articles to the Catholic Encyclopedia (1907-1912): Acts of the Apostles, Aseneth, Aser, Asiongaber, Asmodeus, Bethania, Bethany, Bethany Beyond the Jordan
