= Lietuvos Skautija =

National Scouting organization of Lithuania

Lietuvos skautija
- Lithuanian Scouting
- Headquarters: Kaunas
- Country: Lithuania
- Founded: 1918/1995
- Membership: 2832
- Chief Executive (Vyriausioji skautininkė): Gabrielė Kučytė - Bunė
- Affiliation: World Organization of the Scout Movement
- Website www.skautai.lt

Lietuvos skautija, the primary national Scouting organization of Lithuania, became a member of the World Organization of the Scout Movement in 1997. The coeducational Lietuvos skautija has around 3000 members as of 2023.

== History of Lithuanian Scouting ==
Scouting first came to Lithuania in 1909, as part of the Russian Empire. The indigenous Lithuanian Scout movement began in 1918, when the first Scout patrol and then troop was founded in Vilnius by Scouter Petras Jurgėla. In 1922, the first Scout General Assembly united the Lithuanian Scout Movement into the Scout Association of Lithuania. In 1924, the Scout Association of Lithuania was registered as a member of the World Bureau. Lithuania was a member of the World Organization of the Scout Movement from 1923 to 1940. Scouting prospered until 1940, when occupation forces banned Scouting.

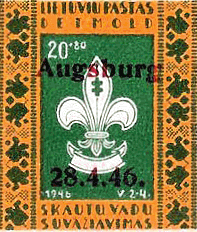
Stamp of Lithuanian Scout postal system for displaced persons camps

In 1940, the Soviet occupation of Lithuania resulted in Scouting being banned. In the years after World War II, a displaced Scouting movement started in the camps for displaced persons, and provided a makeshift but quite effective camp postal system, using Scout postage stamps like the one illustrated.

Many of the Scouts-in-Exile soon moved to the United States and Australia. The organization was able to continue its work abroad, and grew into a large organization with Boy Scouts, Girl Scouts and academic Scout divisions in Canada, the United States, Australia, England, Germany, Italy, Argentina, Uruguay and Brazil. If the Scouting movement had not been kept alive in the diaspora, Scouting would have had a slower time being reestablished upon Lithuania's regaining of independence.

On April 29, 1989, on the eve of the restoration of Lithuanian independence, the Scout Movement in Lithuania was reestablished and Scouting activity restarted. Regular contacts were established and maintained with WOSM. In November, 1989, after the fall of communism, Scouting formally reemerged in the newly democratic Lithuania. Scouting in Lithuania is conducted by several organizations. In 1992, Scouting in Lithuania applied for membership in WOSM. Their constitution was approved by the World Committee. However, serious conflicts with the organization of Lithuanian Scouting, especially former Scouts, resulted in the postal vote being suspended. From 1992 to 1995, attempts were made to insure democratic decision-making processes and to simplify structure, with little progress made.

A new association, formed by the majority of youth leaders in all regions of Lithuania as well as by key members of the former National Council, was created in the spring of 1995 under the name Lietuvos skautija. It was registered by the Ministry of Justice in September, 1995. A meeting of the general assembly was called in November, 1996, which was open to all active leaders registered in any of the several Scout Associations existing in Lithuania. A new constitution, conforming to WOSM requirements, was adopted and a new National Council was elected. Members of Lietuvos skautija, Lietuvos Skautų Sąjunga and the Lithuanian Sea Scout Association attended as delegates. The Lietuvos Lenkų Skautų Sajunga (the Polish Scout Association in Lithuania) attended as observers. Representatives of all the above-mentioned associations were involved in the drafting of the constitution and planning the meeting. It was confirmed by the General Assembly that the name of the organization would henceforth be Lietuvos skautija, Lithuanian Scouting.

Lietuvos skautija (Lithuanian Scouting) is the World Organization of the Scout Movement recognized Scout organization. Lithuania was readmitted as a national member organization of WOSM on July 25, 1997. Lietuvos skautija has a membership of around 3000 boys and girls as of 2023, spread throughout the country. Lietuvos skautija has sent contingents to European and World Scout events. Lietuvos skautija was represented at the 1995, 1998, 2007, 2011 World Jamborees, and held a national camp in 1998 in Nemunaitis near Alytus to celebrate the 80th anniversary of the founding of Scouting in Lithuania. National jamborees are held every 5 years and were also organized in 2003 (in Plateliai), 2008 (in Zarasai district), in 2013 (in Telšiai), in 2018 (in Rumšiškės, for the centenary) and in 2023 (in Klaipėda).

Historic membership badge of Lithuanian Scouting

== Programme sections and uniform ==
Age group	Age range	Uniform
Cub Scouts	6 to 9	Orange Scout scarf, grey or green T-shirt or jumper with "Stengsiuos!" ("I will do my best!") printed on the back
Scouts	10 to 13	Yellow Scout scarf, beige shirt, khaki trousers/skirt
Venture Scouts	14 to 17	Maroon Scout scarf, beige shirt, khaki trousers/skirt
Rovers and Rangers	18 to 29	Blue (girls) or purple (boys) Scout scarf, beige shirt, khaki trousers/skirt. Male rovers also traditionally carry a Y-shaped Scout staff

Lietuvos skautija also contains Sea Scout and Air Scout units, with different uniforms.

Age group	Age range	Uniform
Junior Sea Scouts (Beavers)	6 to 9	Light blue Scout scarf
Sea Scouts	10 to 13	Blue Scout scarf with 3 white stripes, navy shirt, navy trousers/skirt
Sea Venture Scouts	14 to 17	Black Scout scarf with 3 white stripes, navy shirt, navy trousers/skirt
Rovers and Rangers	18 to 29	Navy scarf with a piece of amber sewn on (girls) or navy tie with thin white stripe (boys), navy shirt, navy trousers/skirt

Age group	Age range	Uniform
Junior Air Scouts	6 to 10	Orange Scout scarf with a blue stripe
Air Scouts	10 to 13	Yellow Scout scarf with a blue stripe, sky blue shirt
Air Venture Scouts	14 to 17	Green Scout scarf with a blue stripe, sky blue shirt

== Programme details and ideals ==
The official organisation logo includes the traditional Scouting lily as used in Lithuania. The Lithuanian Scouting lily includes the Columns of Gediminas and is framed by a line symbolising the rue, which traditionally was a Lithuanian Girl Scout symbol

The Scout Motto is Budėk!, translating as Be Prepared in Lithuanian; the response is Vis budžiu!, I am always prepared. The Lithuanian noun for a single Scout is Skautas.

The Cub Scout programme is based on Rudyard Kipling's Jungle Book, the focus of the programme is on learning through play. Scout troops are organised in patrols and the programme takes Scouts through 3 Achievement Levels before they are invested into Venture Scouts. The youth programme for 6-18 year-olds also includes a variety of activity badges. The rover/ranger section follows the tradition of accepting new members into crews for a candidacy period before proper investment.

== Scout Oath ==
"Do not expect anything from others, always give them what you can. Live for your Motherland and mankind; be a friend of nature and animals. Be a gentleman and a protector of the poor and weak, and always take the right road. Strengthen your body and soul and educate yourself. May your will be as a bowstring resiliently drawn. Follow Saint George, the patron of Scouts: exterminate the evil in the world, but first of all in yourself. First think of others and only then yourself. Grow up as a mighty oak tree and do not bow down as a weeping willow. Be better tomorrow than you are today or than you were yesterday. Keep God in your heart and remember your motto, 'be prepared.'"

== Scout Law ==
- A Scout is straight forward and keeps their word.
- A Scout is faithful to God and Motherland.
- A Scout is useful and helps neighbors.
- A Scout is a friend to neighbors and is a brother or sister to other Scouts.
- A Scout is polite.
- A Scout is a friend of nature.
- A Scout obeys parents and the authorities.
- A Scout is lively, does not lose both self-control and hope.
- A Scout is thrifty.
- A Scout is sober and chaste in mind, words and actions.

== See also ==
- Lietuvos skaučių seserija
- Lietuvos skautų sąjunga
- Scouting in Lithuania
- Young Riflemen
