= Scouting and Guiding in Lithuania =

Outdoor organizations within Lithuania

historic emblem of Lithuanian Scouting

Scouting and Guiding in Lithuania consist of a number of different organizations, some of them connected to international bodies. Besides open associations, there are also some for the national minorities living in Lithuania, as well as Girl Scouts of the USA.

== Lithuanian organizations ==
Lithuanian Scout organizations include (membership numbers from)

- Lietuvos skautija (LS), member of the World Organization of the Scout Movement, registered in 1996, 1,446 members
- Lietuvos skaučių seserija, associate member of the World Association of Girl Guides and Girl Scouts, restarted in 1989, 652 members
- Lietuvos jaunųjų krikščionių sąjungos skautai ir skautės (LJKSSS), YMCA and YWCA Scouts and Guides, registered in 1996, 130 members
- Jūrų skautija "Divytis", Lithuanian Sea Scouts, registered in 2001, 600 members
- Lietuvos lenkų harcerių (skautų) sąjunga (LLHS), connected to Związek Harcerstwa Polskiego, aimed at ethnic Poles, restarted in 1989, 400 members
- Lietuvos Nacionalinė Europos Skautų Asociacija (LNESA), belonging to the UIGSE, founded in 1992, 300 members
- Lietuvos skautų sąjunga (LSS), restarted in 1989, 1,000 members
- Visagino skautų organizacija (VSO), connected to LS and to ORYuR, aimed at ethnic Russians, founded in 1992, 300 members (50 active)
- Žemaitijos skautų organizacija (ŽSO), belonging to the World Federation of Independent Scouts (WFIS), founded in 2002, 150 members
- "Związek Harcerstwa Polskiego na Litwie" (ZHPnL) (Polish Scouting Association in Lithuania) belonging to the Confédération Européenne de Scoutisme

== Alumni organizations ==
Alumni organizations include

- Lietuvos suaugusių skautų bendrija (LSSB) for former Scouts and Guides, member of ISGF, founded in 1992, 50 members
- Studentų skautų korporacija "Vytis", Akademinė skaučių draugovė ir Skautų filisterių sąjunga (Korp!Vytis, ASD ir SFS), an academic corporation of Scouts and Guides, restarted in 1989, 200 members

== Lithuanian Scouts-in-exile ==
The association Lietuvių Skautų Sąjunga was formed after World War II and serves the Lithuanian communities abroad. As of 2008, there were active units in Australia, Canada, the United Kingdom and the United States. Most of these units were also members of the respective National Scout Organization within WOSM.

== International Scout units in Lithuania ==
In addition, there are USA Girl Scouts Overseas in Vilnius, serviced by way of USAGSO headquarters in New York.

== See also ==
- Lithuanian Riflemen's Union
