= Saint Bernard's Seminary =

Historic seminary in New York, US

- U.S. National Register of Historic Places
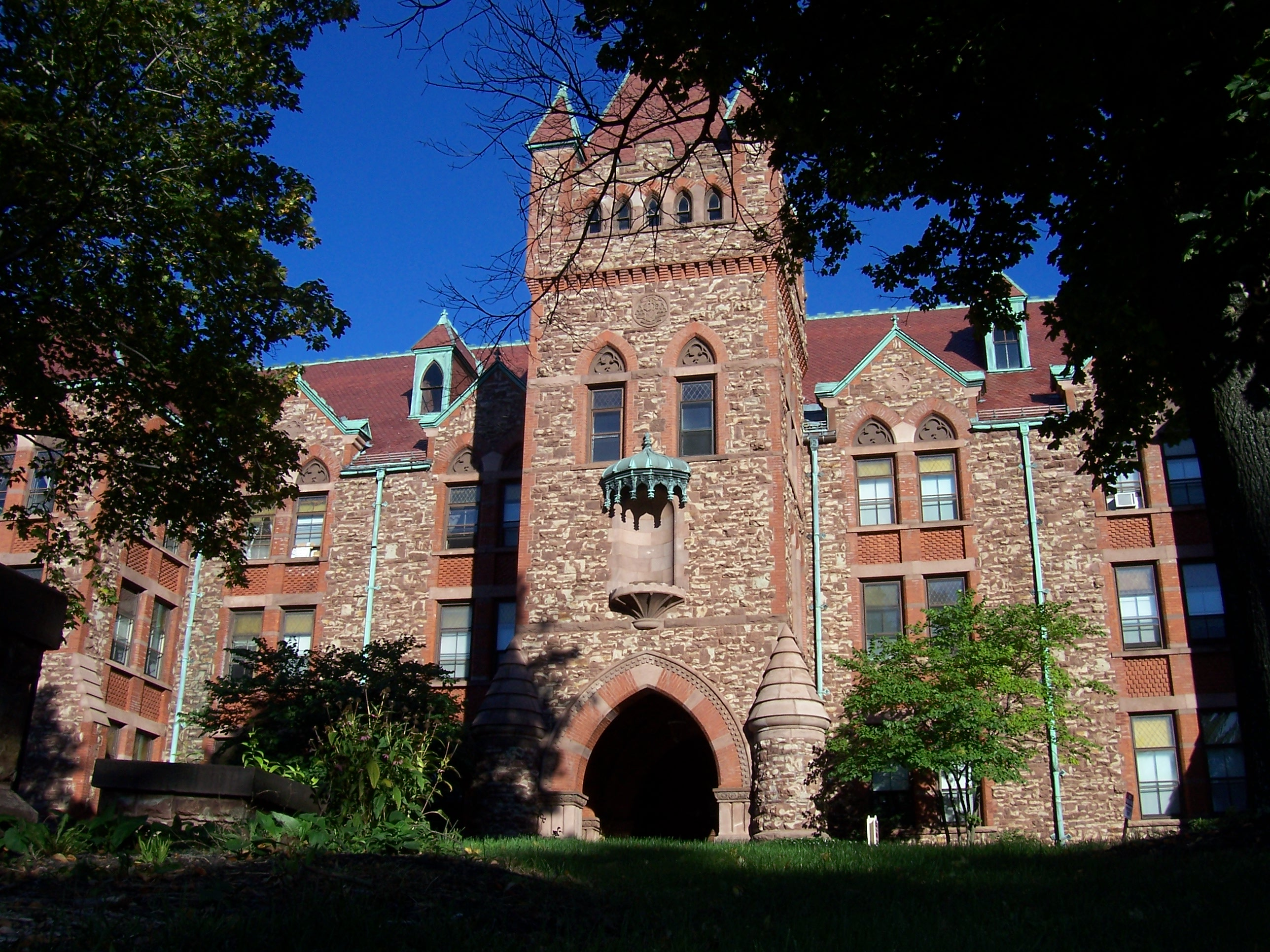
- Saint Bernard's Seminary, October 2012

- Location within New York Location within the United States
- Location: 2260 Lake Ave. Rochester, New York
- Coordinates: 43°12′34″N 77°37′44″W
- Area: 13.8 acres (5.6 ha)
- Built: 1891
- Architect: Warner & Brockett
- Architectural style: Gothic
- NRHP reference No.: 96000435
- Added to NRHP: April 18, 1996

Saint Bernard's Seminary is a historic former Catholic seminary complex located at Rochester in Monroe County, New York. The educational institution formerly inhabiting the complex changed its name to St. Bernard's Institute and moved to the campus of Colgate Rochester Divinity School in 1981 and was renamed again to St. Bernard's School of Theology and Ministry when it moved to a new campus on French Road in 2003. The original property was owned by Kodak between 1982 and 1992. It was eventually sold to a private developer and is now a senior citizen residential complex.

== Description ==
The campus of Saint Bernard's is a group of four interconnected buildings designed by noted Rochester architects Warner & Brockett and built between 1891 and 1908. The four buildings are the Center or Main Building (1891–1893), the Chapel (1891–1893), the South Building or Philosophy Hall (1900), and the North Building or Theology Hall (1908). All four buildings use Medina Sandstone in their construction and share a Victorian Gothic style of architecture with stone walls and brick trim.

It was listed on the National Register of Historic Places in 1996.

== Gallery ==
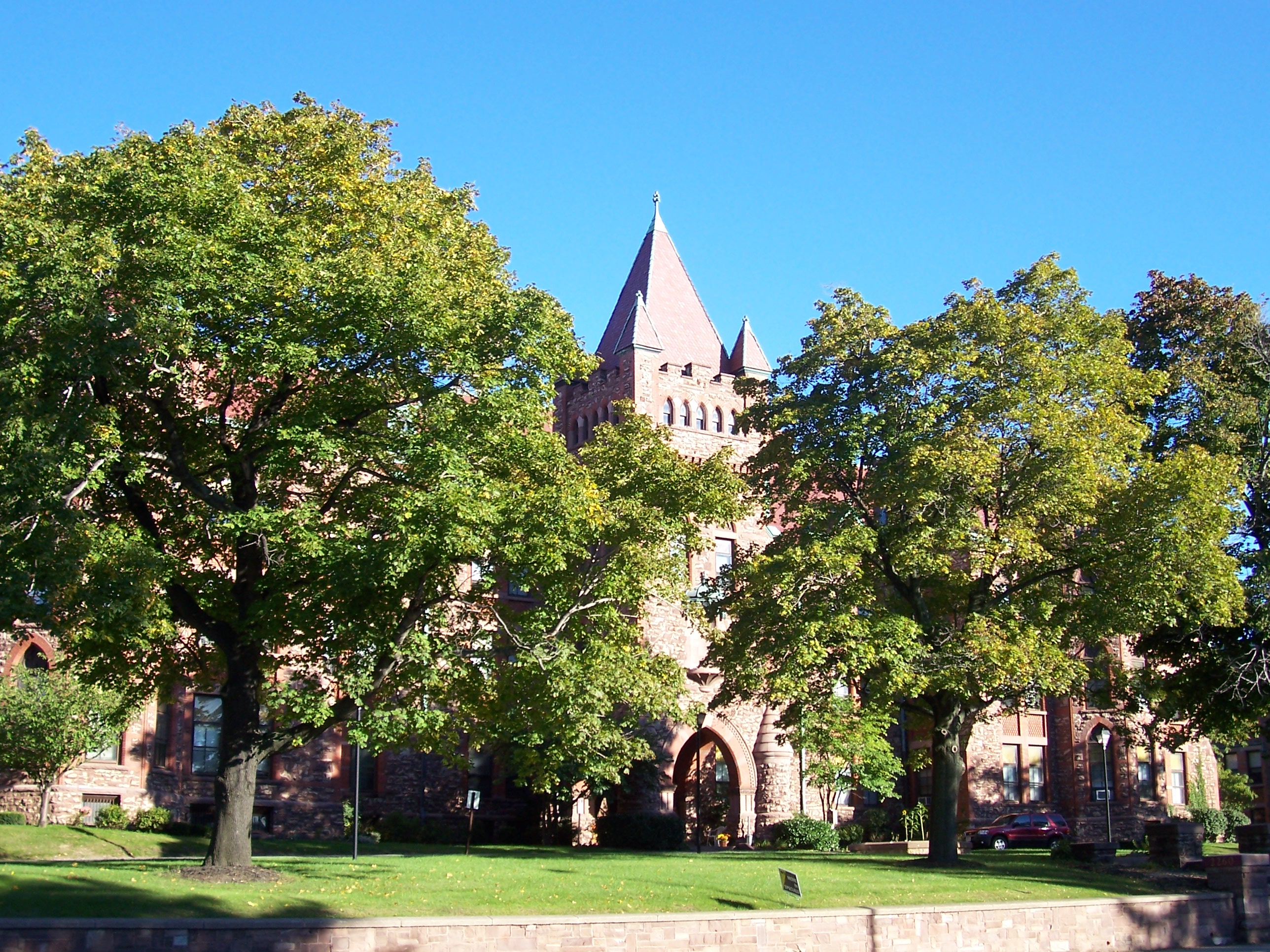
Main building

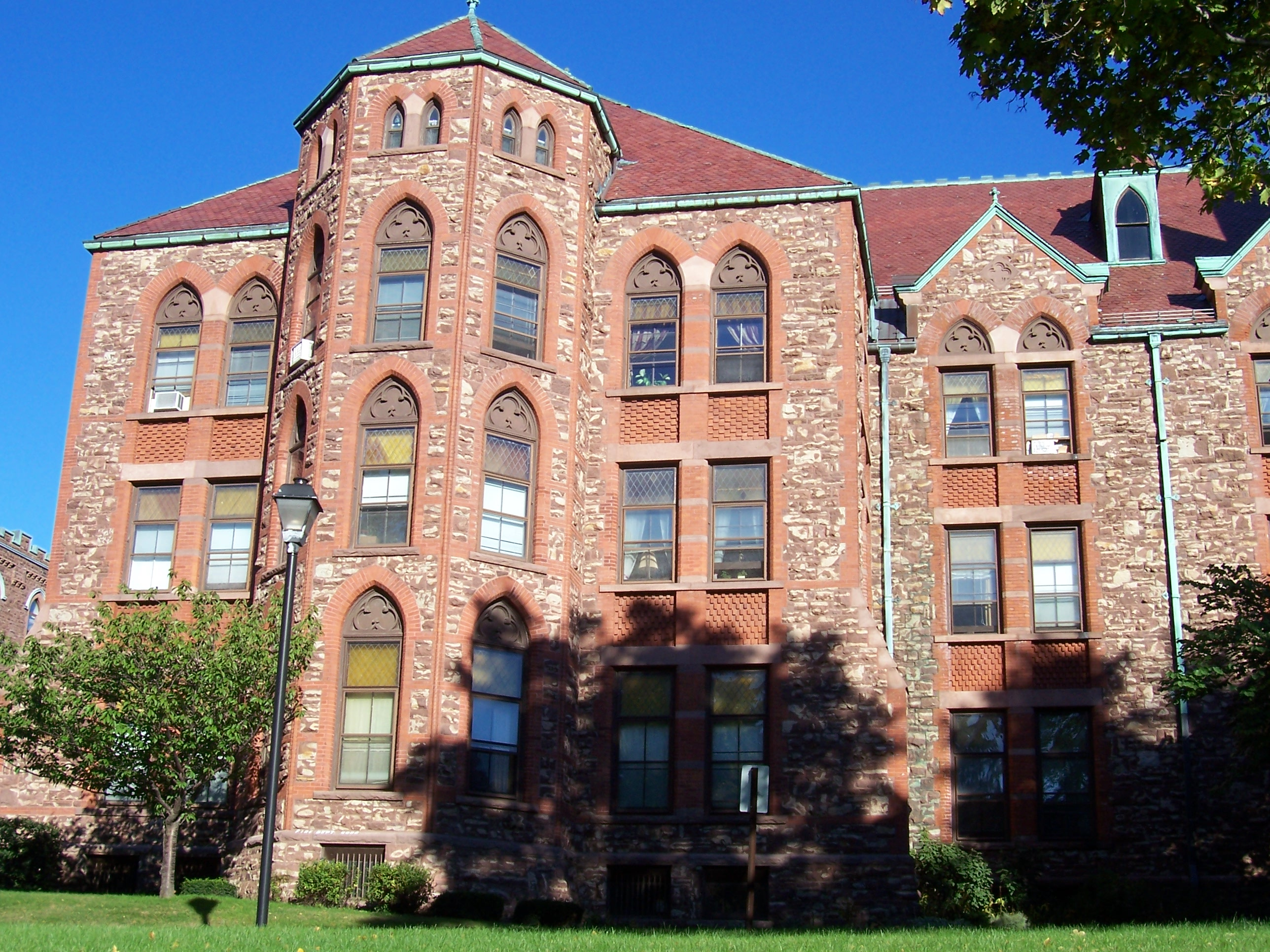
North building

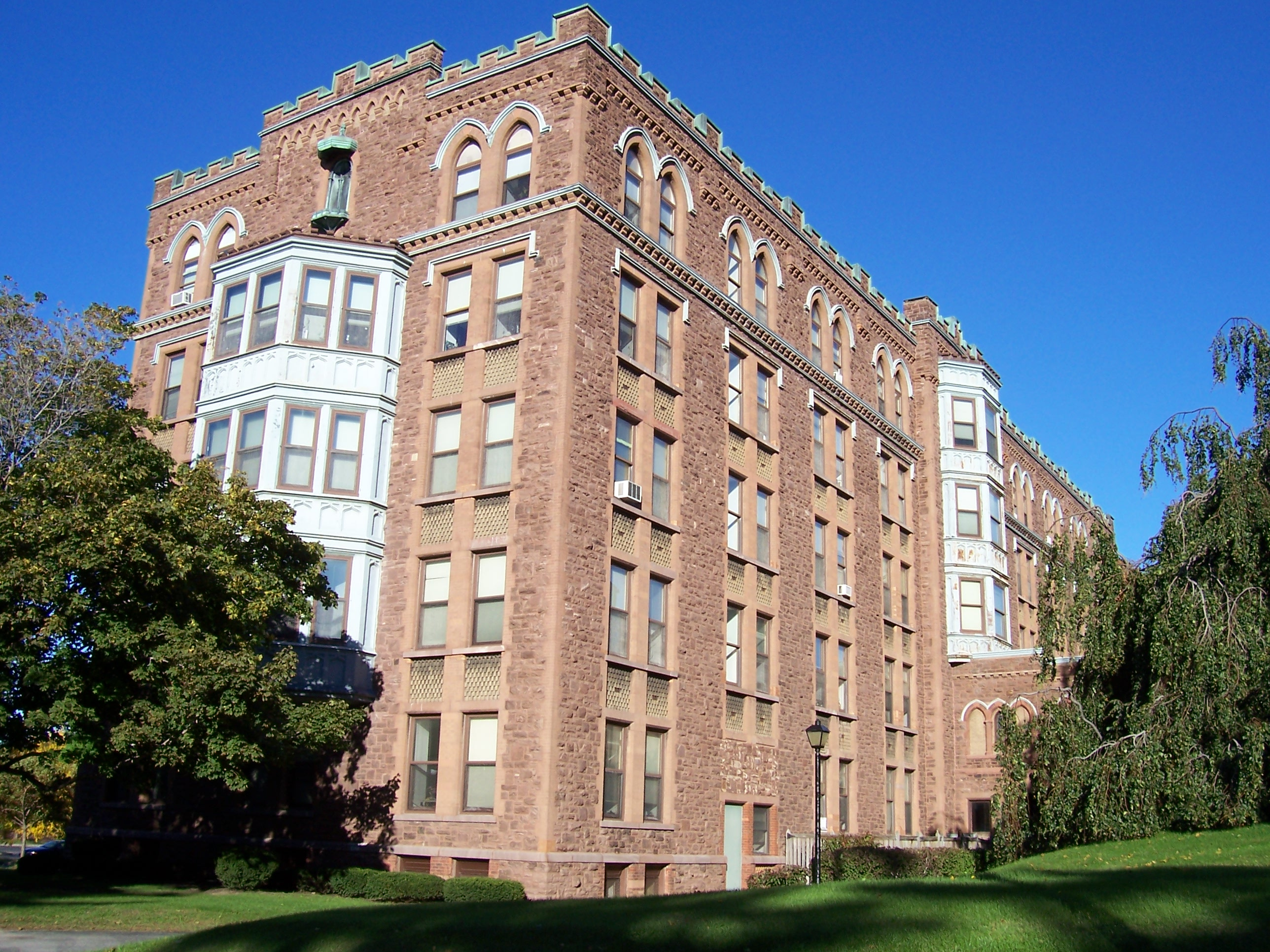
South building

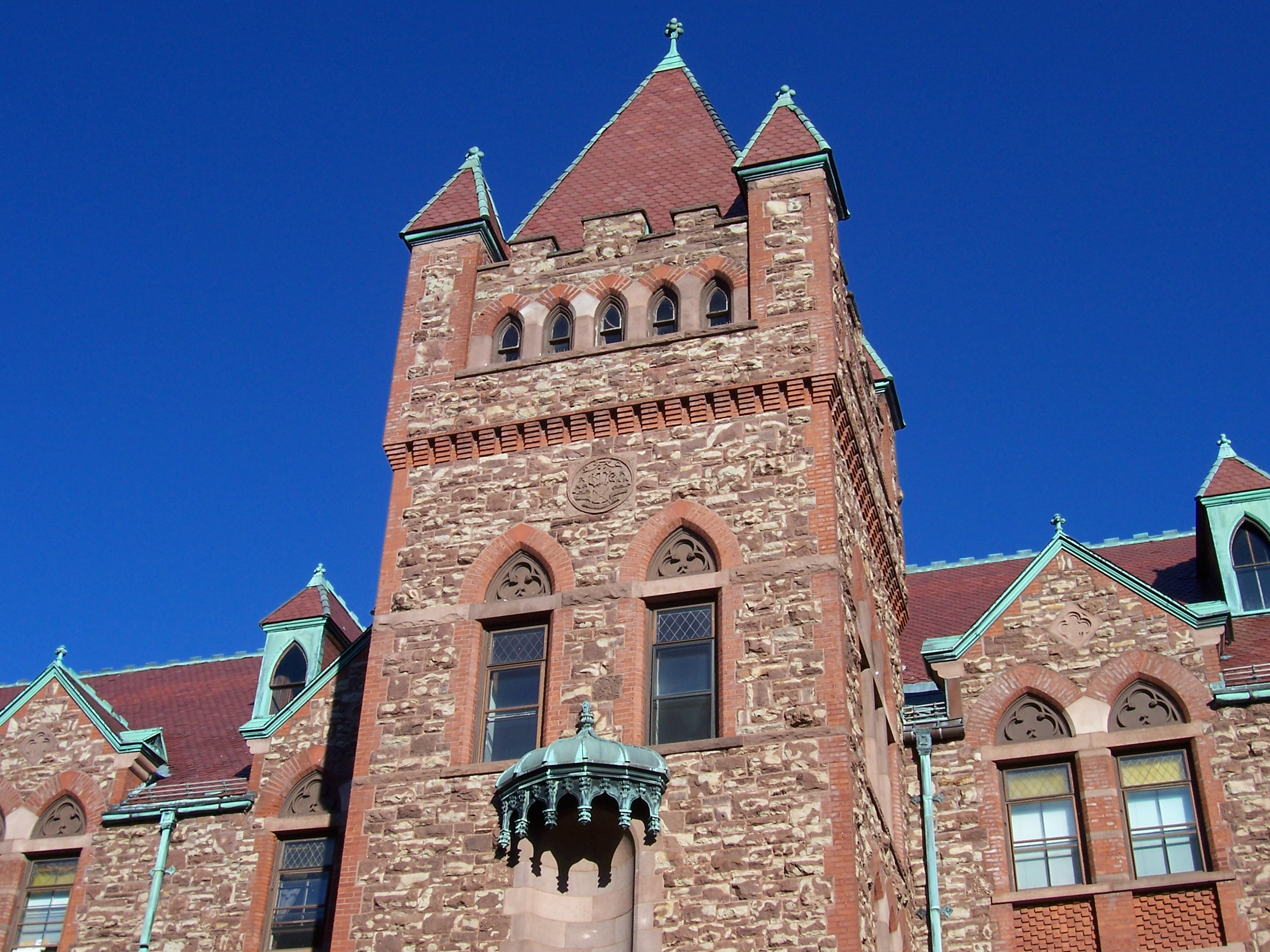
Tower

== See also ==
- St. Bernard's School of Theology and Ministry
