= St. Bernard's School of Theology and Ministry =

Private Catholic graduate school in Rochester, New York, United States

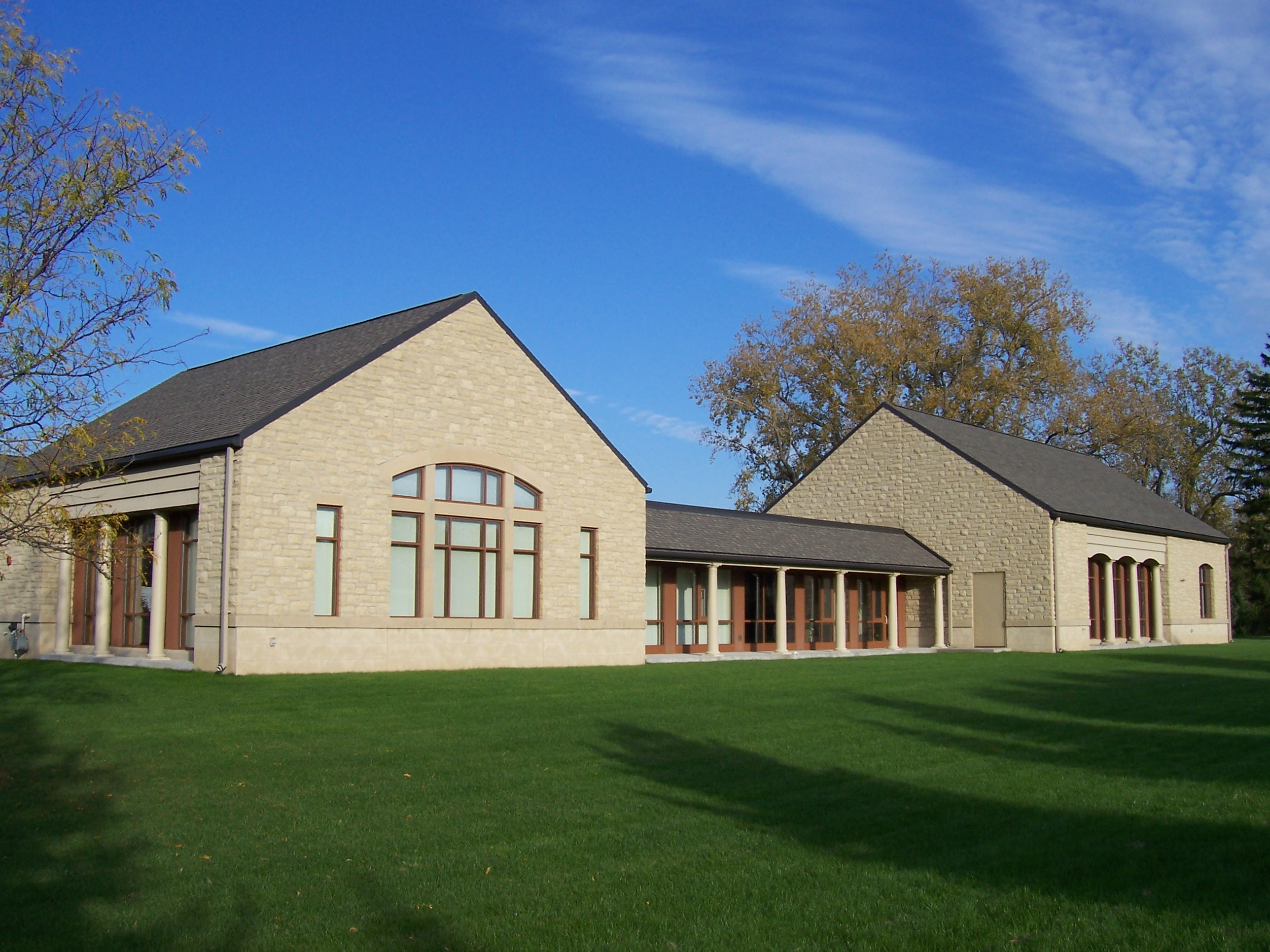
- Rochester
- Motto: Ipsa propitia pervenis
- Motto in English: You have reached the most favorable places.
- Type: Private graduate school
- Established: 1893 (original St. Bernard's); 1981 (current institution)
- Religious affiliation: Catholic Church
- Academic affiliations: University of Rochester, Colgate Rochester Crozer Divinity School (Rochester), Siena College (Albany)
- President: Stephen Loughlin
- Dean: Matthew Kuhner
- Faculty: 6
- Students: 130 (spring 2023)
- Location: Rochester, New York, United States; 43.1013°N 77.5260°W
- Campus: Main campus in Pittsford; extension in Albany; classes in Syracuse at LeMoyne College
- Website: www.stbernards.edu

St. Bernard's School of Theology and Ministry is a private Catholic graduate school in Rochester, New York, United States. It has existed in its current form since 2003 but has existed in previous forms since 1893.

== History ==
St. Bernard's original institution was Saint Bernard's Seminary, founded in 1893 in Rochester. Standing for 98 years in its original location on the north side of Rochester, it also educated men and women for lay ministry, and was one of the first U.S. seminaries to accept laity. The St. Bernard's Seminary building still exists and is on the National Register of Historic Places. It is currently known as St. Bernard's Park, a senior living apartment community, which completed a $27.98 million renovation in 2021.

On 25 September 1981, Saint Bernard's Seminary was granted by the New York State Education Department an amendment to its charter, changing its corporate name to St. Bernard's Institute. The campus was relocated to that of Colgate Rochester Divinity School, sharing the buildings, including the library, and cross-registering students for classes that fit both schools' curricula. The institute also opened an extension in the Roman Catholic Diocese of Albany in autumn 1989.

In 2003, St. Bernard's assumed its current name and moved to its own facility on French Road in Rochester, New York. It has been there ever since and offers four graduate degrees in theology, pastoral studies, divinity, and Catholic philosophy - all of which can be taken online.

It is the official repository for the writings and papers of the noted evangelist and author, Archbishop Fulton J. Sheen, who was Bishop of Rochester.

== See also ==
- Saint Bernard's Seminary
