= DeSales High School (Geneva, New York) =

Private school in Geneva, New York, United States

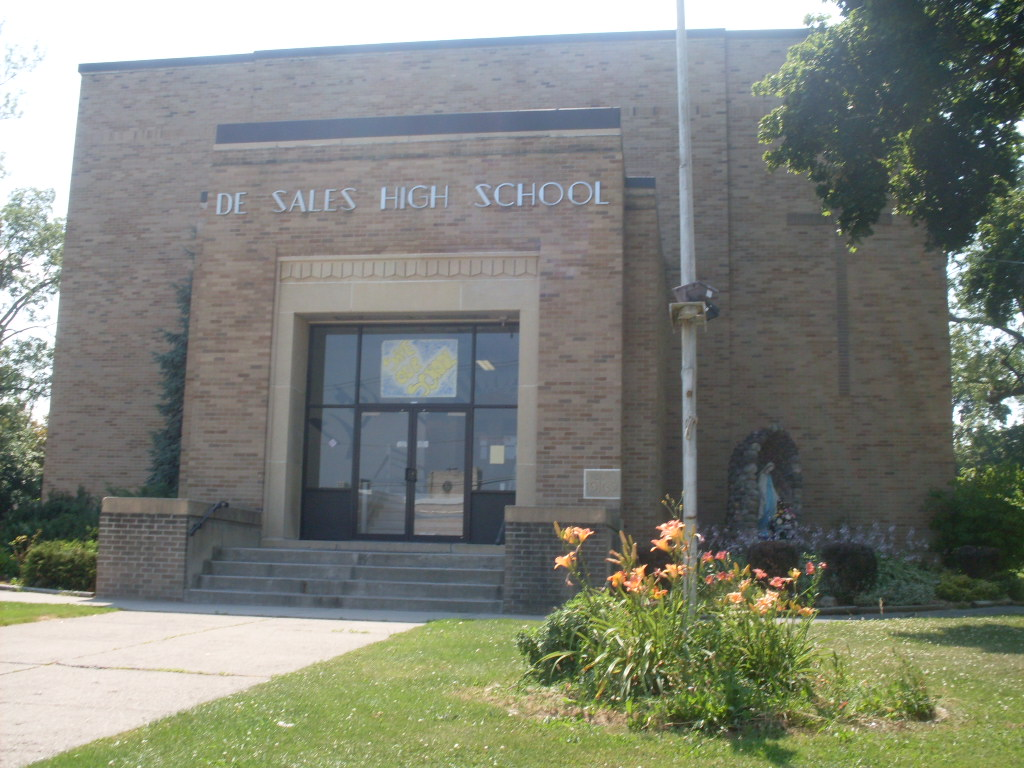

Location
- 90 Pulteney Street; Geneva, (Ontario County), New York 14456; United States; 42°51′59.4″N 76°59′18″W

Information
- Type: Private, Coeducational
- Religious affiliation: Roman Catholic
- Established: 1912
- Closed: 2012
- Grades: 9-12
- Campus: Urban
- Colors: Blue and Gold
- Team name: Saints
- Accreditation: Middle States Association of Colleges and Schools
- Yearbook: The Salesian
- Website: https://web.archive.org/web/20050401233927/http://www.desaleshs.org/

DeSales High School was a Catholic school established in 1912 in the Diocese of Rochester. It was located in the northern sector of Geneva, New York. DeSales High's mission was "to provide an academically excellent education in an intimate, faith-filled community". It was the only Catholic high school in the Finger Lakes region. DeSales closed on July 31, 2012 by the Diocese of Rochester due to financial struggles and decreasing enrollment. The final Senior class (the class of 2012) graduated in the centennial of the school.

== History ==
=== Former principals ===
Previous assignment and reason for departure denoted within parentheses.

- John Muckle–1912-1916
- Francis Mason–1916-1928
- Edward K. Ball–1928-1939
- Raymond P. Nolan–1939-1953
- Joseph Hogan–1953-1955
- C. Richard Nagle–1955-1957 (Unknown, transferred to St. Thomas' Church)
- John A. Morgan–1957-1958
- Marie Margaret –1958-1959 (Latin/Music teacher - DeSales High School, named Vice Principal of St. Agnes High School)
- Rose Adelaide–1959-1965
- Andrew–1965-1970 (English teacher - DeSales High School, unknown)
- Agnes Catherine Battersby–1970-1975 (Vice Principal - St. Agnes High School, named Pastoral Assistant of St. Patrick's Church)
- Edward J. Tracey–1975-1999 (Principal - Bishop Kearney High School, retired)
- Daniel E. Skinner–1999-2002 (Vice Principal - Waterloo High School, retired)
- Karen M. Juliano–2002-2005 (Principal - Holy Rosary Academy, named President of Notre Dame Academy)
- Joseph A. Grasso C.PP.S.–2005-2007 (Principal - Aquinas Institute, resigned)
- Martin D. Cox–2007-2009 (Principal - Elma Primary School, named Superintendent/Principal of Grades PreK-4 of Fillmore Central School)
- Scott C. Redding–2009 (Vice Principal - DeSales High School, named Assistant Administrator of Mynderse Academy)
- Gerald J. Macaluso–2009-2012 (Interim Superintendent - Naples Central School District, retired)

== Gallery ==
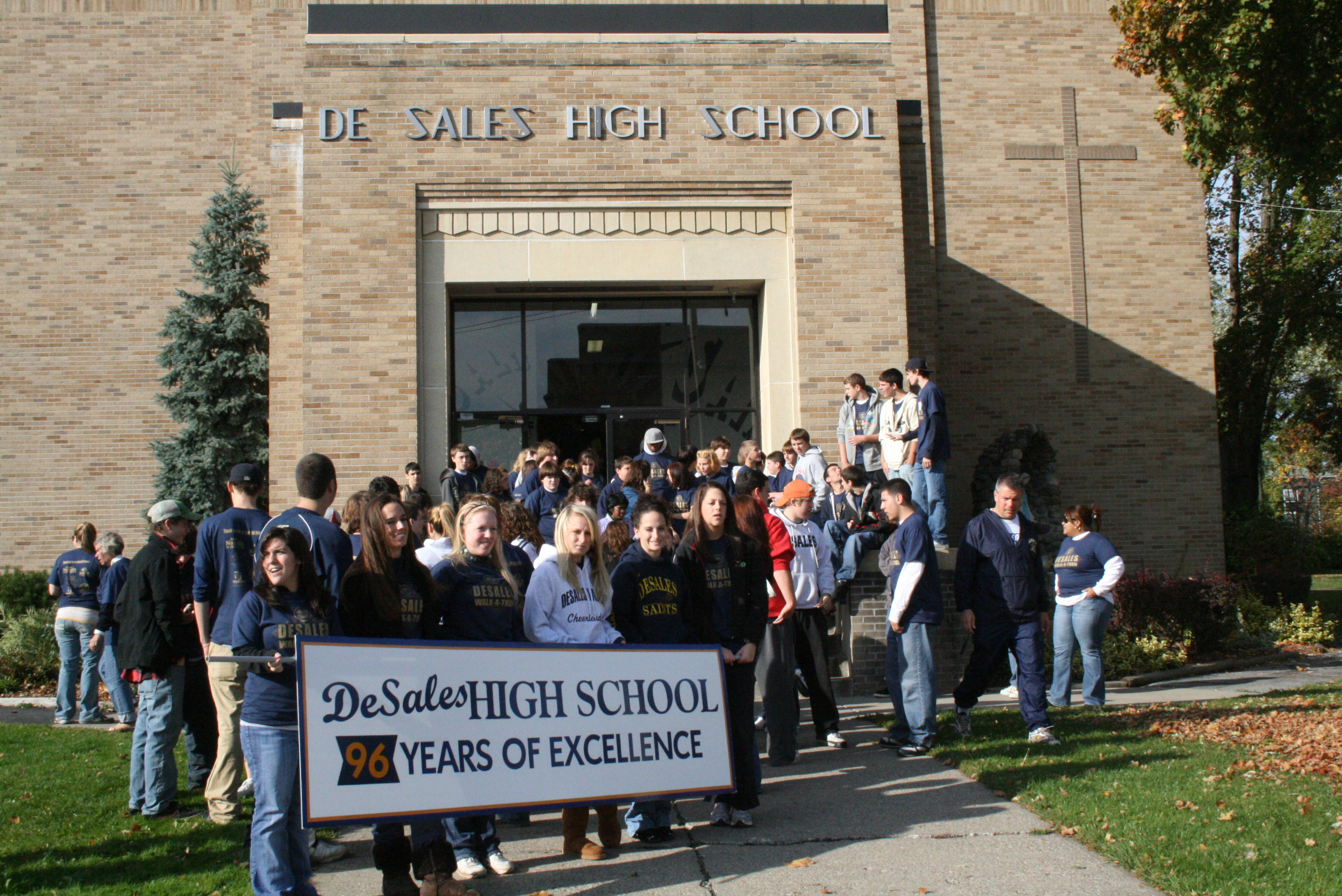
DeSales students on their 2nd annual Walk-a-Thon.

== See also ==
- St. Francis-St. Stephen's School
- Geneva High School
