= Penn Yan Central School District =

School district in New York, United States

Location
- Penn Yan, New York Finger Lakes United States

District information
- Motto: Our Children, Our Community, Our Future
- Grades: K-12
- Superintendent: Howard Dennis
- Schools: 3

Students and staff
- Athletic conference: Section V
- District mascot: Mustang
- Colors: Blue and orange

Other information
- Asst. Superintendent - Business: Cathleen Milliman
- Website: Penn Yan Central School District

Penn Yan Central School District is a school district in Penn Yan, New York, United States. The superintendent is Howard Dennis. The district operates three schools: Penn Yan Academy, Penn Yan Middle School, and Penn Yan Elementary School.

== Administration offices ==
The district offices are located at 1 School Drive. The current superintendent is Howard Dennis.

=== Selected former superintendents ===
- Willard F. Joslyn
- Carl W. Thompson
- Michael Thompson–?-1986
- Daniel Farsaci
- Gloria C. Carroll 1992–1999
- Gene M. Spanneut–?-2004 (unknown, retired)
- Tiffany Phillips [interim]–2004-2005
- Ann E. Orman–2005-2011 (Assistant Superintendent of Curriculum/Instruction - Geneva City School District, retired)
- Thomas A. Cox–2011 [interim] (Deputy Superintendent - Monroe 1 BOCES, named Interim Superintendent of Lyndonville Central School District)
- David S. Hamilton–Superintendent–2011-2014 (Director of Instruction - Churchville-Chili Central School District, named Superintendent of Baldwinsville Central School District)

== Penn Yan Academy ==
Penn Yan Academy
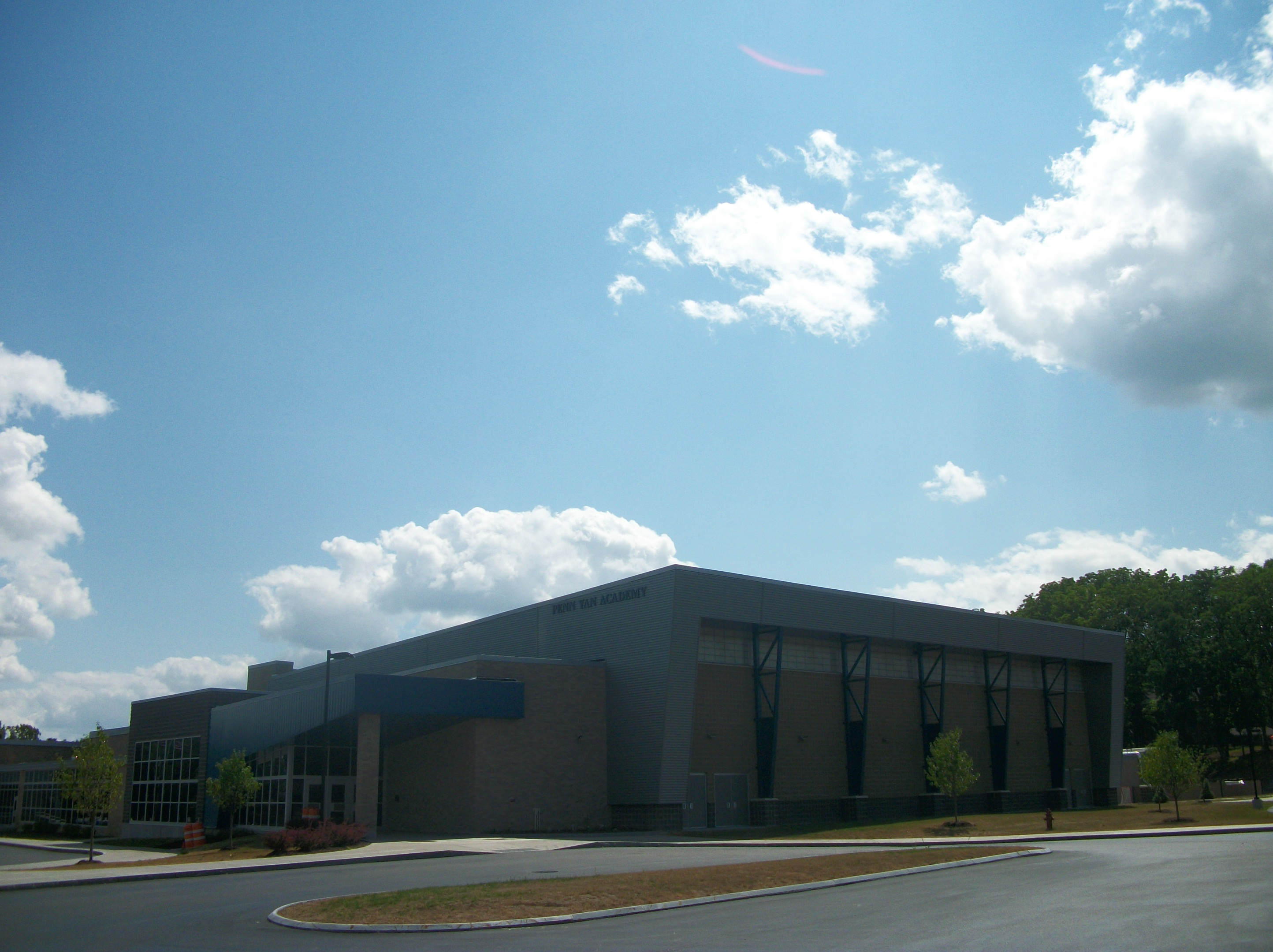

Information
- Principal: David D. Pullen
- Grades: 9-12
- Website: Penn Yan Academy

Penn Yan Academy is located at 305 Court Street and serves grades 9 through 12. The current principal is David Pullen.

=== History ===
==== Selected former principals ====
Previous assignment and previous assignment denoted in parentheses

- William Joslyn
- O. Roger Killian–?-1962
- David Durkee–1962-1972 (Principal - Averill Park High School, named Director of Guidance for Penn Yan Academy)
- Glenn W. Bronson–1972-1988 (Principal - Delcastle Technical High School, placed on special assignment)
- Thomas A. Rakovan–1988-1997 (Principal - West Genesee High School, retired)
- Keith E. Mathews–1997-2009 (Principal - Cayuga/Onondaga BOCES, retired)

== Penn Yan Middle School ==
Penn Yan Middle School
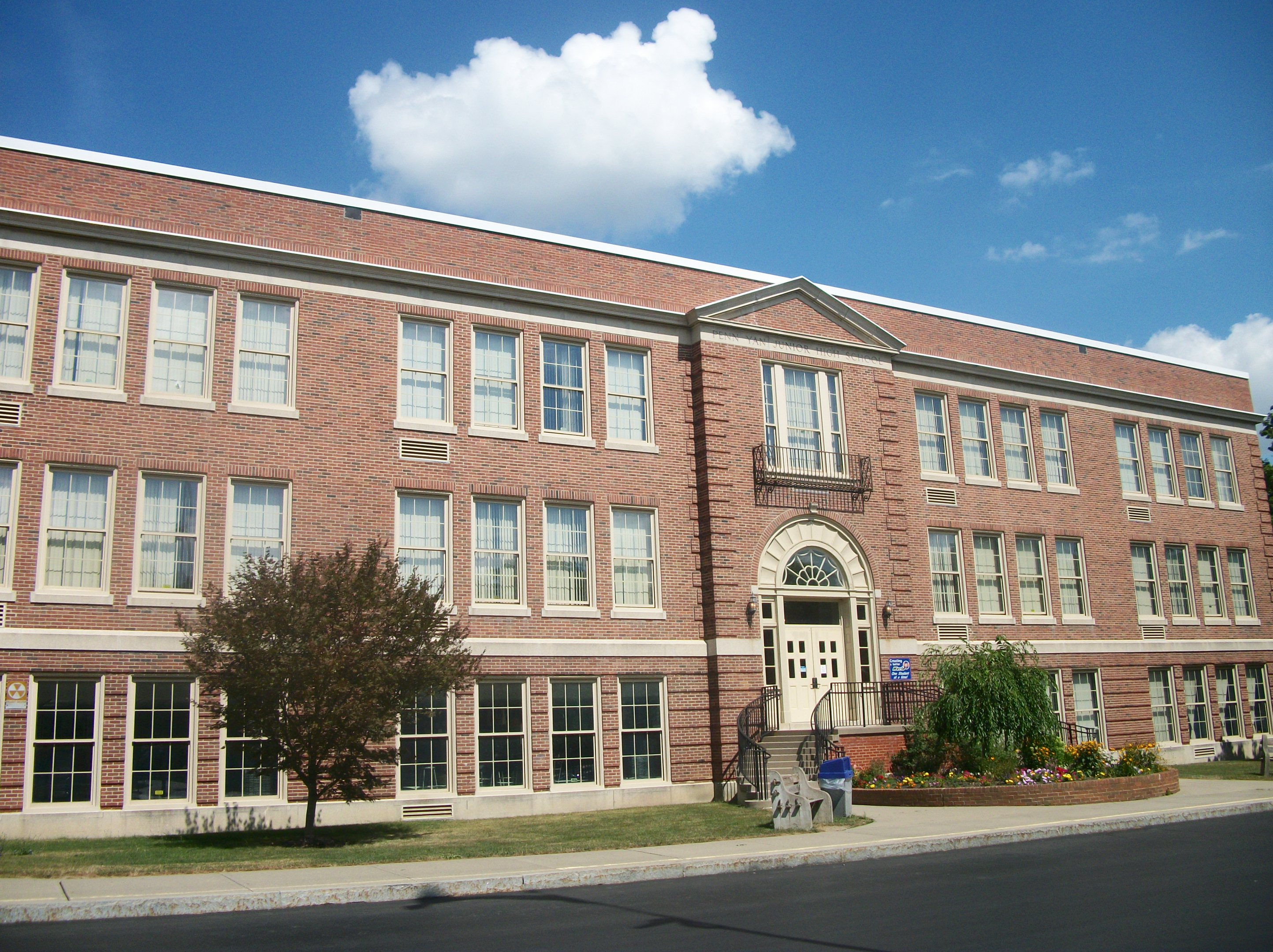

Information
- Principal: Kelley S. Johnson
- Grades: 6-8
- Website: Penn Yan Middle School

Penn Yan Middle School is located at 515 Liberty Street and serves grades 6 through 8. The current principal is Kelley Johnson.

=== History ===
==== Selected former principals ====
Previous assignment and reason for denoted in parentheses

- John R. Barry
- Shirley Callison (Unknown, named Special Projects Coordinator for Penn Yan Central School District)
- Richard Rodriguez–1986-1988 (Assistant Principal - Penn Yan Academy, named Superintendent of Forestville Central School)
- M. Douglas Zoller–1988-1989 (Superintendent - Seneca Falls Central School District, retired)
- Billie Bauman–1989-1996 (Unknown, named Principal of Watkins Glen Elementary)
- Linda J. Raide–1996-2007 (Unknown, retired)
- David Pullen–2007-2009 (Principal - Geneva High School, named Principal of Penn Yan Academy)
- Howard Dennis–2012-2013 (Associate Superintendent - Penn Yan Central School District, returned to position)

== Penn Yan Elementary ==
Penn Yan Elementary
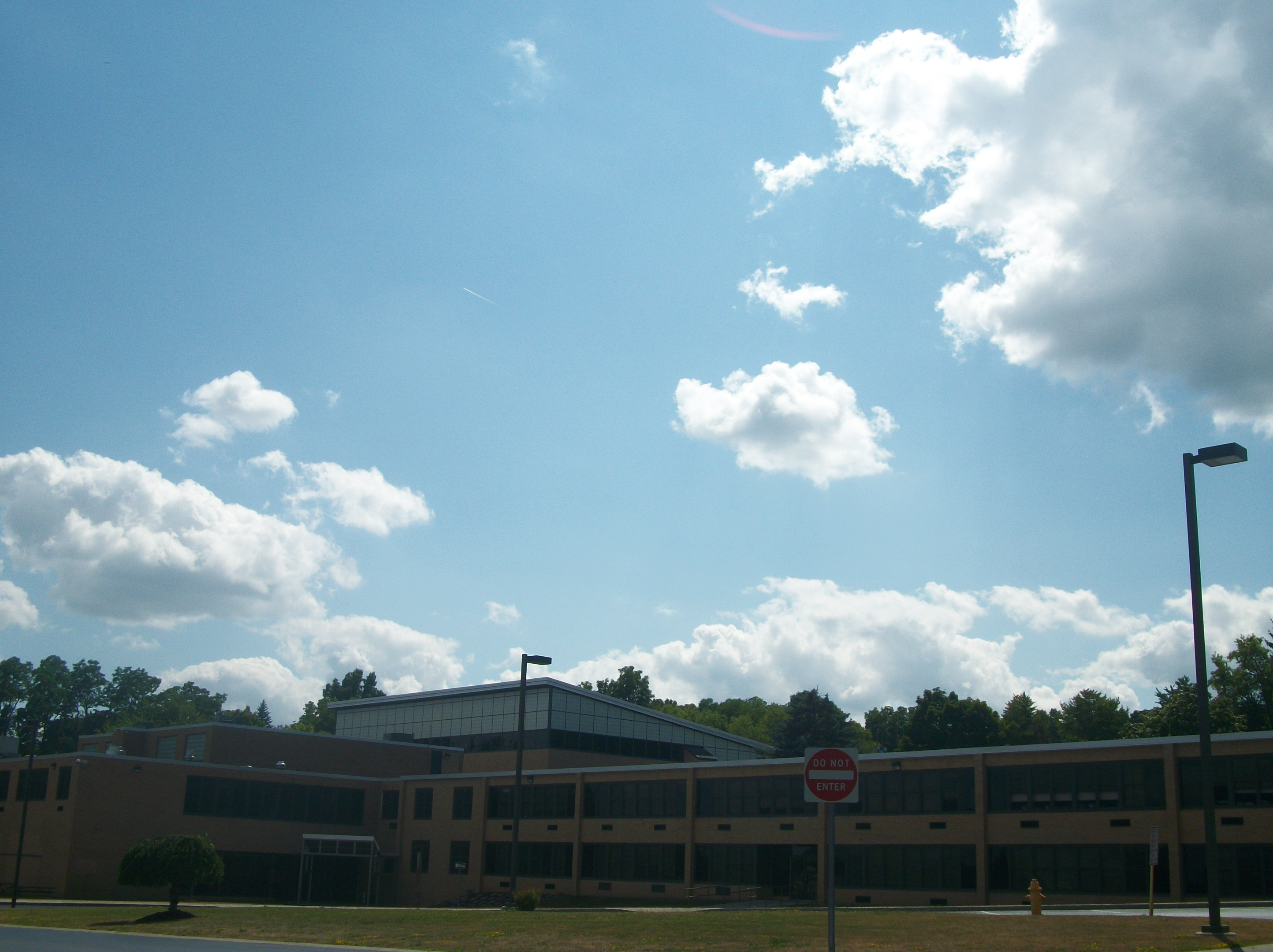

Information
- Grades: K-5
- Website: Penn Yan Elementary

Penn Yan Elementary is located at 3 School Drive and serves grades K through 5. The current principal is Edward Foote.

=== History ===
==== Selected former principals ====
Previous assignment and reason for departure denoted in parentheses

- Elmer A. Willard
- Thomas A. Cox–2005-2006 (interim)

== Selected former administrators ==
Year	Superintendent	Elementary Principal	Elementary Vice Principal	Middle School Principal	Middle School Vice Principal	Academy Principal	Academy Asst. Principal	
1999-2000	Gene Spanneut	Matt Herz		Linda Raide		Keith Mathews		
2000-2001	Gene Spanneut	Matt Herz	Ed Bronson	Linda Raide		Keith Mathews		
2001-2002	Gene Spanneut	Matt Herz	Ed Bronson	Linda Raide		Keith Mathews		
2002-2003	Gene Spanneut	Matt Herz	Ed Bronson	Linda Raide		Keith Mathews		
2003-2004	Gene Spanneut	Matt Herz	Ed Bronson	Linda Raide		Keith Mathews		
2004-2005	Tiffany Phillips*	Matt Herz	Ed Bronson	Linda Raide		Keith Mathews		
2005-2006	Ann Orman	Tom Cox*	Ed Bronson	Linda Raide		Keith Mathews		
2006-2007	Ann Orman	Ed Bronson	Marcie Ware	Linda Raide		Keith Mathews		
2007-2008	Ann Orman	Ed Bronson	Marcie Ware	Dave Pullen	Warren Kinsey	Keith Mathews	Becky Perrault	
2008-2009	Ann Orman	Ed Bronson	Marcie Ware	Dave Pullen	Warren Kinsey	Keith Mathews	Becky Perrault	
2009-2010	Ann Orman	Ed Bronson	Marcie Ware	Becky Perrault	Warren Kinsey	Dave Pullen	Paul Tansey	
2010-2011	Orman/Cox*	Ed Bronson	Marcie Ware	Becky Perrault	Warren Kinsey	Dave Pullen	Paul Tansey	
2011-2012	David Hamilton	Marcie Ware	Warren Kinsey	Becky Perrault		Dave Pullen	Paul Tansey	
2012-2013	David Hamilton	Marcie Ware		Dennis*/Johnson	Warren Kinsey	Dave Pullen	Paul Tansey	
2013-2014	David Hamilton	Ed Foote	Kelly Dalos	Kelley Johnson		Dave Pullen	Paul Tansey	Warren Kinsey
2014-2015	Howard Dennis	Ed Foote	Kelly Dalos	Kelley Johnson		Dave Pullen	Paul Tansey	Warren Kinsey
2015-2016	Howard Dennis	Ed Foote	Kelly Dalos	Kelley Johnson		Dave Pullen	Paul Tansey	Warren Kinsey
2016-2017	Howard Dennis	Ed Foote	Kelly Dalos	Kelley Johnson		Dave Pullen	Paul Tansey	Warren Kinsey
2017-2018	Howard Dennis	Ed Foote	Kelly Dalos	Kelley Johnson		Dave Pullen	Paul Tansey	Warren Kinsey

== St. Michael School ==
St. Michael's School
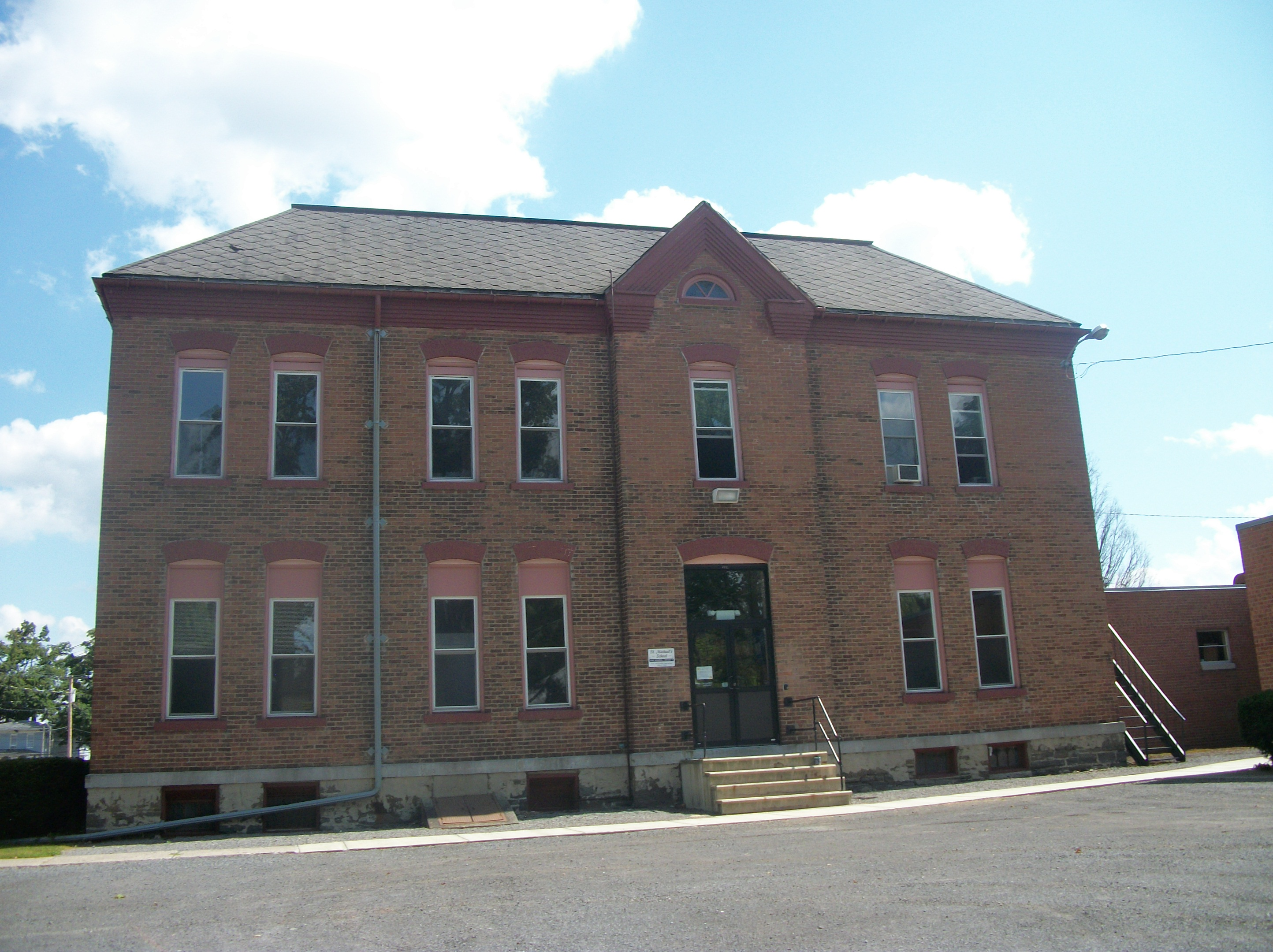

Information
- Type: private school, Coeducational
- Religious affiliation: Roman Catholic
- Oversight: Diocese of Rochester
- Principal: Debra Marvin
- Grades: PK-5
- Website: St. Michael's School

St. Michael School is a parochial school located at 214 Keuka Street and serves grades PK through 5. The current principal is Debra Marvin.

=== History ===
The school was founded in 1882.

==== Selected former principals ====
Previous assignment and previous assignment denoted in parentheses

- Anne Maura Morris
- Catherine Gibbons
- Jo Ann Struck–?-2005
- James P. Tette–2005-2009 (Computer teacher - St. Michael's School, retired)
- David M. Paddock–2009-2012 (Principal - Fairport High School, retired)
- Thomas Flood
