= Karthaus =

Karthaus may refer to the following:

- Karthaus Township, Pennsylvania, a township in Clearfield County
- Kartuzy, a town in Poland, known in German as Karthaus
- Jim Karthaus, an Australian rules footballer who played with Richmond
- Olaf Karthaus, a German polymer chemist
- Karthaus/Certosa, a frazione of the municipality of Schnals/Senales in South Tyrol
