= Jasper Collins =

American gridiron football player (born 1991)

Uconn Huskies
- Title: Assistant Wide Receivers coach

Personal information
- Born: November 28, 1991 (age 34); Geneva, New York, U.S.
- Listed height: 5 ft 10 in (1.78 m)
- Listed weight: 185 lb (84 kg)

Career information
- High school: Geneva (NY)
- College: Mount Union
- NFL draft: 2013: undrafted

Career history

Playing
- Miami Dolphins (2013)*; Cleveland Browns (2013)*; Miami Dolphins (2013)*; Pittsburgh Steelers (2014)*; Cincinnati Bengals (2014)*; Boston Brawlers (2014–2015); Hamilton Tiger-Cats (2015–2017); BC Lions (2018)*
- * Offseason or practice squad member only

Coaching
- Seton Hill (2015) Assistant coach; Marietta (2019–2020) Wide receivers coach; Mount Union (2021) Wide receivers coach; Mount Union (2022) Offensive coordinator & wide receivers coach; Indianapolis Colts (2023) Offensive Assistant; Mount Union (2024–2025) Quarterbacks coach; UConn (2026–present) Assistant Wide Receivers Coach

Awards and highlights
- First-team All-OAC (2011, 2012); 2014 FXFL All-Star
- Stats at Pro Football Reference
- Stats at CFL.ca

Jasper “Junior” Collins (born November 28, 1991) is an American former professional football wide receiver and current football coach for the Indianapolis Colts. He played college football for Mount Union. He was signed by the Miami Dolphins as an undrafted free agent hours after the 2013 NFL draft. After being let go, he became a member of the Cleveland Browns, Dolphins, and Pittsburgh Steelers practice squads before being signed by the Bengals in 2014.

== Early life ==
Collins attended Geneva High School in Geneva, New York. He was a four-year letterwinner who was an all-state, all-conference, and all-area selection multiple times during his career.

== College career ==
Collins attended Mount Union from 2009–2012. During his tenure, he played with former purple raiders wide receiver Cecil Shorts III, and played for the same school as Pierre Garçon. As a freshman, he played in 11 games and had seven catches for 81 yards, and had two punt returns 105 yards including an 89-yard return for a touchdown against Marietta, which is the longest punt return touchdown in Mount Union history. The following season, he played in 15 games and has 66 catches for 908 yards and two touchdowns and was a conference honorable mention. As a junior, he played in 11 games and led team with 67 catches for 844 yards with 13 touchdowns, and had four 100-yard receiving games and earned first-team all-conference accolades. In his last season, he played in 15 games and led the Ohio Athletic Conference in yards per game (112.9), receptions (92), receiving yards (1,694) and receiving touchdowns (22). And was once again earned first-team all-conference honors.

== Professional career ==
=== NFL draft ===
Jasper Collins was not selected in the 2013 NFL Draft.

=== Miami Dolphins ===
On April 27, 2013, Jasper Collins signed as an undrafted free agent with the Miami Dolphins. On July 31, 2013, Collins was waived/injured by the Miami Dolphins. Collins cleared waivers and was placed on injured reserve. On August 3, 2013, he was released with an injury settlement.

=== Cleveland Browns ===
On September 2, 2013, the Cleveland Browns signed Collins to their practice squad.
