= Red Jacket Orchards =

- Industry: Juice, produce
- Founded: 1958; 68 years ago in Geneva, New York, United States
- Key people: Brian Nicholson (president and CEO)
- Number of employees: Up to 200 seasonally
- Website: redjacketorchards.com

Red Jacket Orchards is a fruit juice and produce company based in Geneva, New York.

== History ==
The company was founded in 1958 by Joe and Emily Nicholson on land that was used to grow fruit since 1917. Red Jacket is still owned by the Nicholson family, with the founders' grandson, Brian Nicholson, serving as president and CEO. The company started primarily as a fruit farm and roadside produce stand but since 2010 has focused mainly on beverage production; as of 2019, about 80 percent of the company's revenue came from its beverages. As of 2023, the company managed 250 acres of orchards, down from 500 acres a decade prior. In addition to apples, the orchard's main crop, Red Jacket is a major producer of fresh apricots.

== Supplier ==
Red Jacket supplies the store brand apple juice and apple cider for Wegmans supermarkets and has supplied apples for Angry Orchard. The company also sells apples and juice to Whole Foods.
