= Geneva City School District =

School district in New York, United States

Geneva City Schools

Location
- Geneva, New York Finger Lakes United States

District information
- Motto: Respect ~ Achievement ~ Opportunity
- Grades: PK-12
- Superintendent: Lawrence Bo Wright
- Schools: 4

Students and staff
- Athletic conference: Section V
- District mascot: Panthers
- Colors: Red and Black

Other information
- Assistant Superintendent for School Improvement & Accountability: Tracy Marchionda
- Assistant Superintendent for Administrative Services: Stephen Kruger
- Website: http://www.genevacsd.org/

Geneva City School District is a school district in Geneva, New York, United States. The current superintendent is Lawrence Bo Wright.

Part of the district is in Ontario County and part is in Seneca County.

The district operates four schools: Geneva High School, Geneva Middle School, West Street School, and North Street School.

== History ==
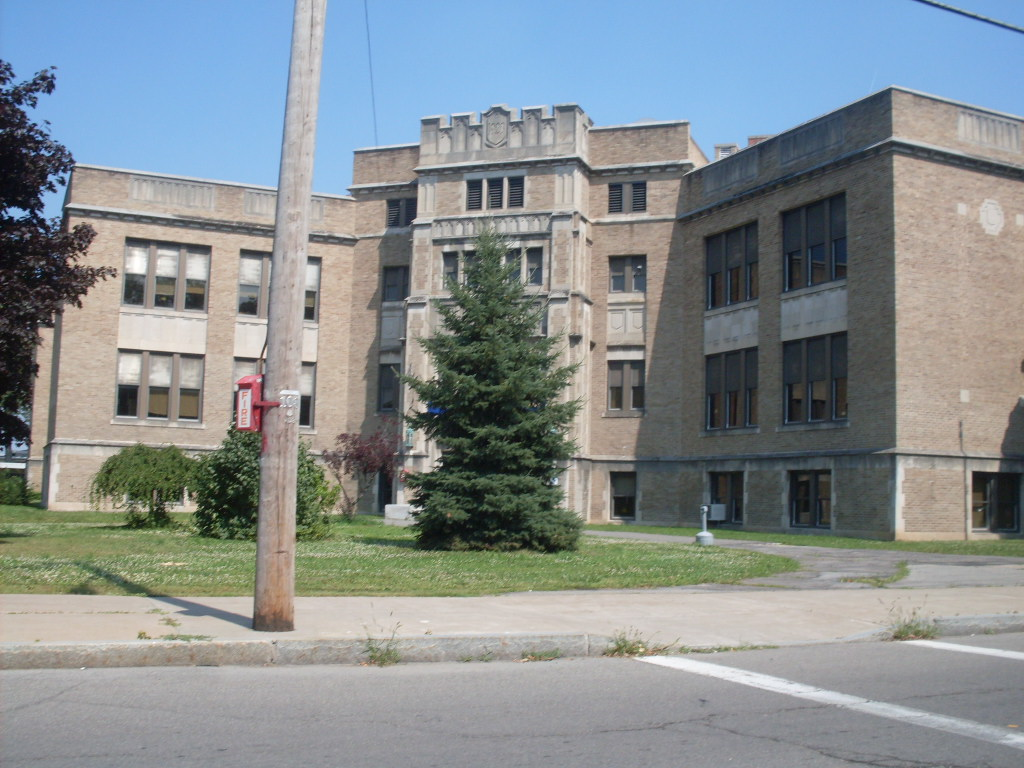
Geneva Senior High School Campus from 1926-1981 Geneva Junior High/Middle School Campus from 1981-2004

Relatively little is known about the early history of Geneva public schools. On June 19, 1812, the New York State legislature passed an act for the establishment of Common Schools which became the basis of the common school system in the State of New York. The date of the first public school established in Geneva in compliance with this act was in 1815. Subsequently, a number of schools were established in Geneva.

In 1853, the Geneva Union School was incorporated and authorized to maintain a classical department and to instruct a normal class. In 1863, Geneva schools were desegregated. On March 16, 1869, the Union School’s corporate title was changed to “The Geneva Classical and Union School.” It was the first Union School built in New York State.

In 1924-1925, a commodious High School building was built at the corner of Milton and Pulteney Streets in the City of Geneva. The school was erected on the grounds formerly occupied by a cemetery; the bodies from which were exhumed and removed to Glenwood Cemetery. The building was used by Finger Lakes Community College for several years starting in 2007, before being demolished in 2014.

In 1981, the high school was moved to its present location at 101 Carter Road in the City of Geneva.

== Administration ==
The District offices are located at 400 West North Street in Geneva. The current Superintendent is Patricia Garcia. Previously, the school's offices were located at 649 South Exchange Street in Geneva, but were moved before the 2010 school year.

== Geneva High School ==
Geneva High School
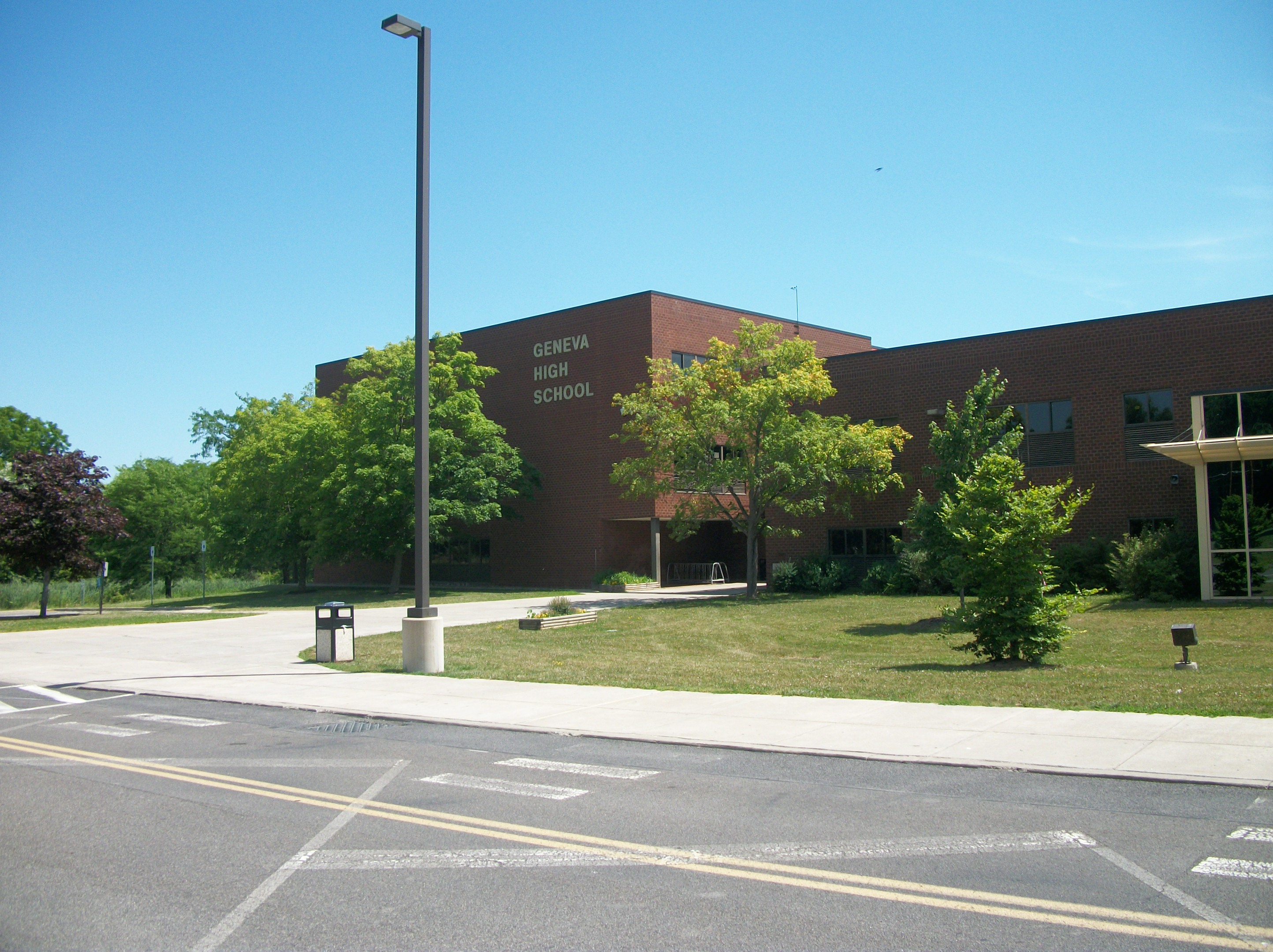

Location
- 101 Carter Road

Information
- Principal: Matt Heath
- Grades: 9-12
- Rival: Canandaigua Academy
- Website: Geneva High School

Geneva High School is located at 101 Carter Road and serves grades 9 through 12. The current principal is Matt Heath.

Geneva High School was originally based on 63 Pulteney Street in Geneva, a three-story building that was constructed in 1926. A new classroom wing was added to the building in 1965 on the southern half of the building. In 1981, following the construction of a new high school building on 101 Carter Road, the High School moved to the new location, the Pulteney Street campus served as the location of Geneva Middle School.

== Geneva Middle School ==
Geneva Middle School
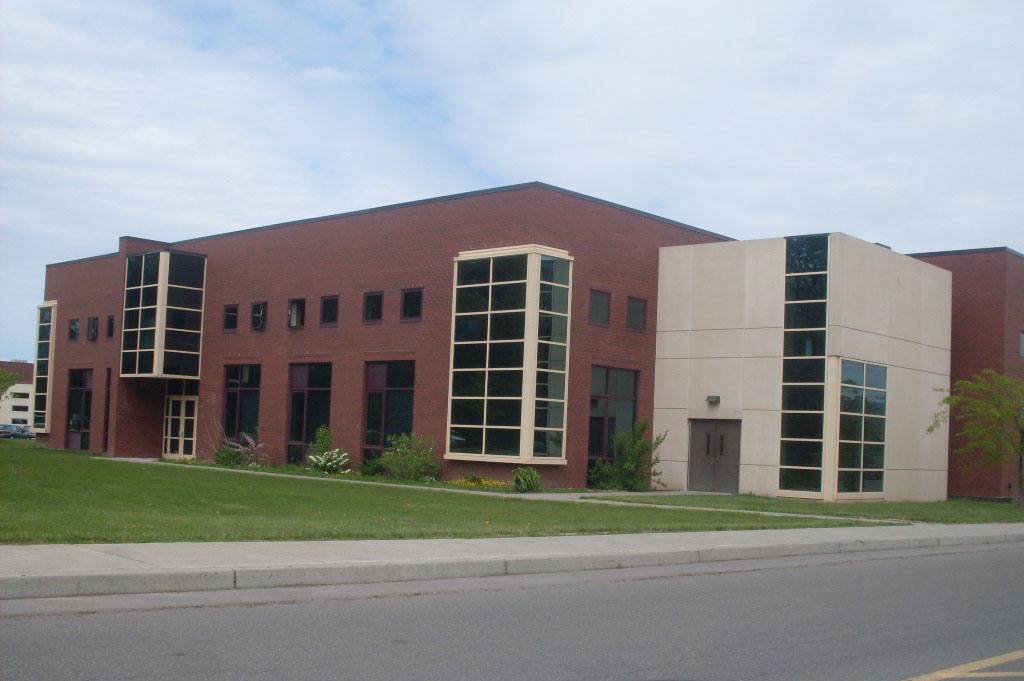

Location
- 101 Carter Road; Suite 200

Information
- Principal: Shannon Kelley
- Grades: 6-8
- Website: Geneva Middle School

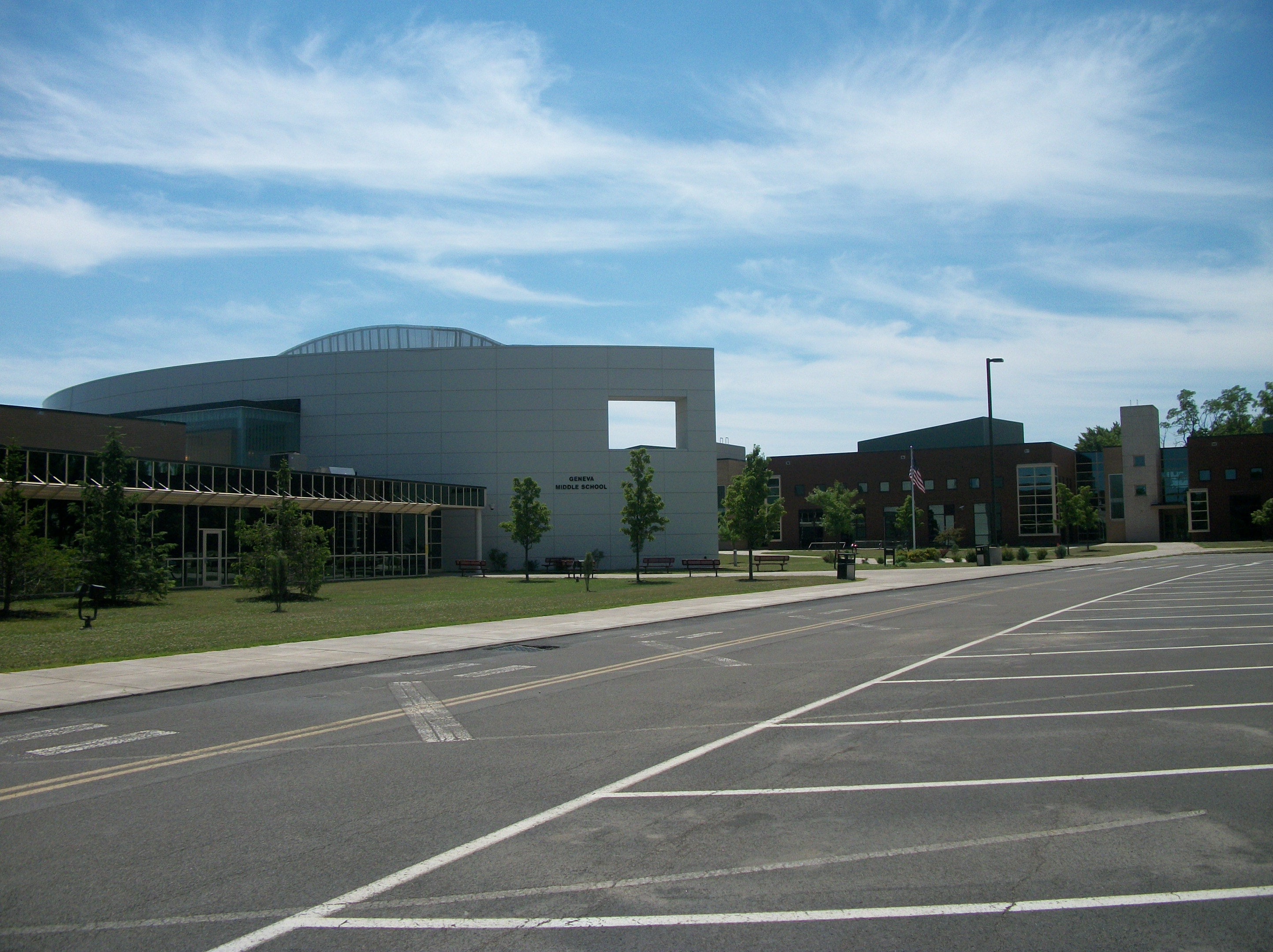
Geneva Middle School

Geneva Middle School is located at 101 Carter Road and serves grades 6 through 8. The current principal is Shannon Kelley.

The middle school began on what is now North Street School on West North Street in Geneva. In 1981, the school moved to the former high school on 63 Pulteney Street and remained there until the 2004 school year. At that time, it moved to a brand new building and campus built adjacent to the High School.

== North Street School ==
North Street School
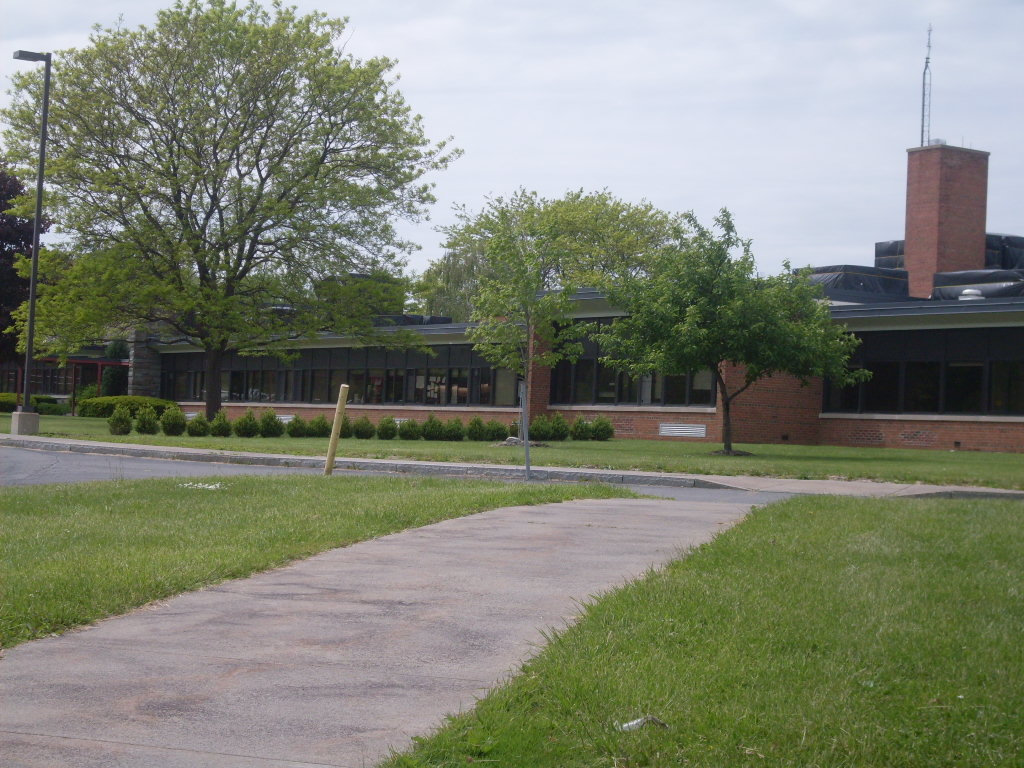

Location
- 400 West North Street

Information
- Principal: Heather Eysaman
- Grades: 2-5
- Website: North Street School

North Street School is located at 400 West North Street and serves grades 2 through 5. The current principal is Heather Eysaman

Originally constructed as the Geneva Junior High School, the building switched to an elementary school housed Grades K through 5 for students who lived within the area close to the school. In 2008-2009, the school became a school for grades 3 through 5, switching principals and some faculty.

Second grade was added to the school along with new classrooms in the fall of 2018.

== West Street School ==
West Street School
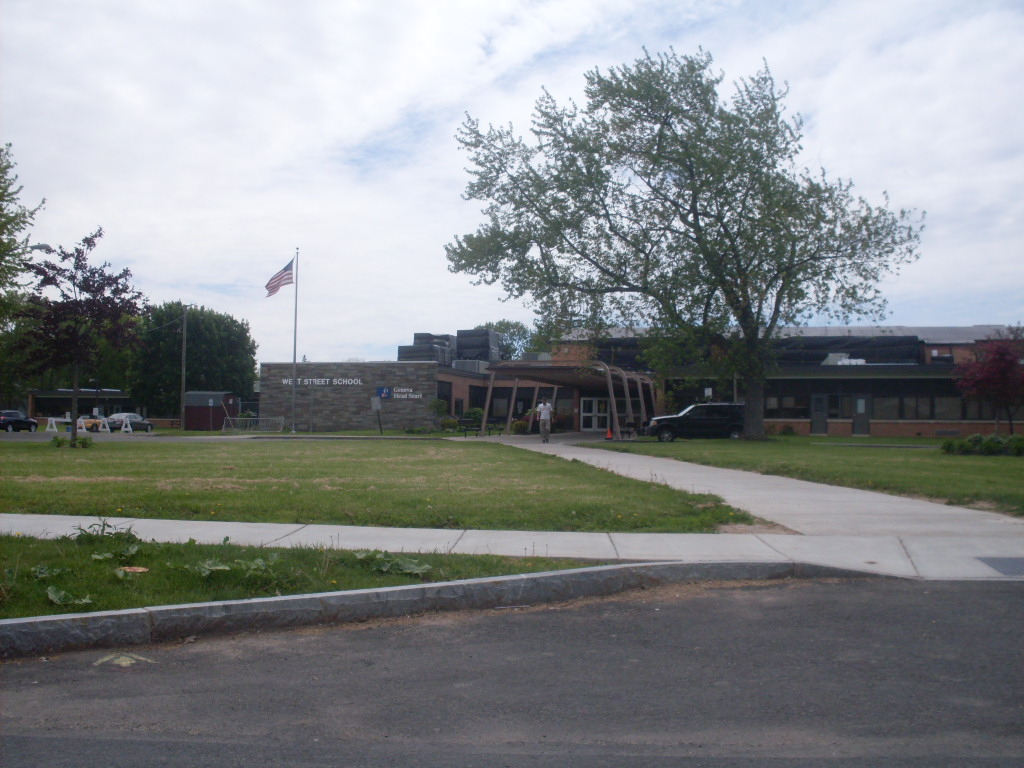

Location
- 30 West Street

Information
- Principal: Tricia Budgar
- Grades: K-1
- Website: West Street School

West Street School is located at 30 West Street and serves grades K through 1. The current principal is Tricia Budgar.

West Street school opened in 1956. The school originally housed Grades K through 6 (eventually Grades K through 5) for students who lived within the area close to the school. In 2008-2009, the school became a school for grades K through 2, switching principals and some faculty.

In 2018, Grade 2 moved to North Street School.

== See also ==
- DeSales High School
- St. Francis-St. Stephen's School
