= Embedded Racism =

2015 book by Debito Arudou

- First edition
- Author: Debito Arudou
- Genre: Non-fiction
- Publication date: 2015

Embedded Racism: Japan's Visible Minorities and Racial Discrimination is a 2015 non-fiction book by Debito Arudou, published by Lexington Books.

The book discusses how in Japan the concept of the Yamato people and Japanese citizenship are closely intertwined and how that affects non-Yamato Japanese citizens. Jeff Kingston, director of Asian Studies at Temple University Japan, wrote in The Japan Times that the book is "a fuller scholarly elaboration" of the author's beliefs regarding "politics, policies and perils of an exclusionist national identity". Within the book Arudou contrasts the treatment of people who conventionally appear Japanese, defined as Wajin (Yamato people), versus people who do not, known as "visible minorities", regardless if the latter have Japanese citizenship or are citizens of other countries. The book states that people with Japanese appearances have societal advantages over citizens and non-citizens who are not visibly Japanese, and therefore the latter can be discriminated against on the basis of their races.

Rebecca Chiyoko King-O'Riain of Maynooth University stated that undergraduate university students seem to be the primary market for this book. Tessa Morris-Suzuki of Australia National University stated that "the deep-seated assumption" that every person with an appearance differing from the typical Japanese person is not a Japanese person is a recurring "central issue".

The second edition was released in November 2021.

== Background ==
Arudou, originally an American and who became a Japanese citizen, and described by Morris-Suzuki as "of relatively ‘Caucasian’ appearance", used his PhD thesis as the basis of this book, and he also included details from his previous activism. There was an instance where an onsen owner had allowed his then-wife and one of his children entry, but not Arudou and the other child, as the former two appeared like Japanese people. Arudou detailed this incident in his book.

== Content ==
The introduction discusses critical studies on race. The body of the book has five sections.

In the first, "The Context of Racism in Japan," Arudou discusses how physical appearance is used to determine whether or not a person is "Japanese" and how racism there has subtlety. This section has two chapters, with the second discussing the country's history of racism.

Section II, with one chapter, has information on the Otaru onsen discrimination case, as well as signs saying that only "Japanese people" are allowed at certain establishments. Arudou had previously written about the topic.

Racial discrimination in Japanese society is covered in the third, "The construction of Japan’s embedded racism’." Four chapters, numbered four through seven, are in this section. They discuss, respectively, the ties between legal rights in the country and the Yamato ethnicity, how one's appearance determines how Japanese someone is according to governmental bureaucracies, issues involving the legal system, and representation of foreigners in the Japanese media.

The fourth section includes information on how the Japanese government reacted to the 2005-2006 United Nations investigation and other accusations of racism in Japan made by foreign parties, as well as activism opposing racism in Japan; only one chapter is in this section.

The fifth section contains information about the consequences of systemic racism and Japan and the book's conclusion; two chapters are in this section. Here the author discusses race theory and makes his case that the Japanese government and society should change course and recognize that people of other ethnicities can improve Japanese society. Morris-Suzuki stated that the recommendation were "clear and cogent" although she felt that Arudou was not having "great optimism" about what may come next.

== Reception ==
Robin W. Aspinall of Doshisha University wrote that the book was "very welcome" due to the hitherto lack of material covering racism in Japan. He concluded it is "highly recommended reading to anyone—whether they self identify as Japanese or foreign or both—who is interested in Japan’s future."

Ralph Ittonen Hosoki of University of California, Irvine described the book as "a timely and important contribution to social and scholarly debates about racial discrimination in Japan."

King-O'Riain wrote that it "makes an important contribution for those wishing to understand racism in Japan better". She in particular praised the fifth chapter as the "strongest", and the final section as "the most interesting contribution to the field in my view."

Morris-Suzuki wrote that the book is "an important, courageous and challenging book".
