= William Smith (businessman) =

American businessman

William Smith (September 2, 1818 – February 6, 1912) was an American businessman. Born in Canterbury, England, he set up a successful nursery business in Geneva, New York with his brothers in the mid 19th century. He also organised the Standard Optical Company in 1883 and was director of the First National Bank of Geneva.

== Astronomy ==
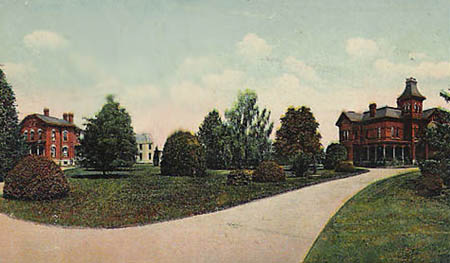
From right to left: Smith's mansion, the Smith observatory, and Brooks' house

Smith, like many wealthy people of the period, had an interest in astronomy and astrology. He had an observatory built behind his mansion in Geneva. He later commissioned the Smith Observatory, with a dome built by the Warner & Swasey Company, and persuaded William Robert Brooks, a prolific comet-finder, to direct it, attracting him with the state-of-the-art observatory and a house built for Brooks and his family. Smith also promoted free lectures given by Brooks.

== Academic institution ==
He then became interested in founding a women's college, a plan that he pursued to the point of breaking ground before realizing that the plan was beyond even his means. Meanwhile, president of Hobart College, Langdon C. Stewardson learned of his interest and tried to persuade Smith to become a donor to the financially struggling college. Unable to convince Smith to provide direct assistance to Hobart, Stewardson redirected the negotiations toward founding a coordinate institution for women, a plan that appealed to the philanthropist. On December 13, 1906, he formalized his intentions; two years later William Smith School for Women - a coordinate, nonsectarian women's college - enrolled its first class of 18 students. That charter class grew to 20 members before its graduation in 1912.

As well as the observatory on his own property, Smith had the Smith Opera House built in 1894 in downtown Geneva. In 1906, Smith donated it to the college.

William Smith died in Geneva on February 6, 1912 at the age of 93, shortly before the charter class of William Smith College was to graduate. Smith left his mansion, the observatory and the house he had had built for Brooks to Hobart College. The house was subsequently bought back by Brooks' daughter, Anna.
