= Ada L. F. Snell =

American poet

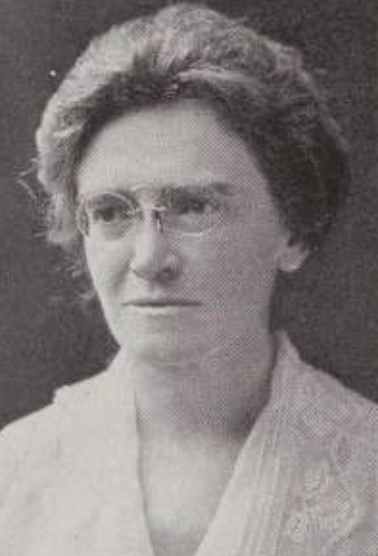
- Ada L. F. Snell, from the 1922 yearbook of Mount Holyoke College
- Born: May 11, 1870; Geneva, New York
- Died: April 18, 1972 (aged 101); South Hadley, Massachusetts
- Occupations: Writer, poet

Ada Laura Fonda Snell (May 11, 1870 – April 18, 1972) was an American poet and college professor. She taught English at Mount Holyoke College from 1892 until 1938.

== Early life and education ==
Ada Laura Fonda Snell was born in Geneva, New York, the daughter of Marvin Snell and Sarah Eleanor Fonda Snell. Her family ran a dairy farm. She graduated from Mount Holyoke College in 1892. She earned a master's degree from Yale University. She completed doctoral studies in English at the University of Michigan, with a dissertation titled Pause and the Formation of Rhythmical Units: A Study based on a Consideration of Milton's Blank Verse (1916), under the advice of Fred Newton Scott.

== Career ==
Snell began teaching at Mount Holyoke College in 1892. "Young students, I have discovered in my teaching of English, are very loath to believe that any great writer ever contemplated problems of form," she wrote in 1913; "they like to think that the commas, capitals, spelling and content are all the happy result of genius." She retired as English department head in 1938, but remained involved in the campus community.

Snell's academic work involved studies of poetic meters, using recordings and other new technologies. She was the author of Pause: A Study of its Nature and its Rhythmical Function in Verse, Especially Blank Verse (1918), Mount Holyoke College Verse (1928), Palatines along the Mohawk and their church in the wilderness (1948), Joyful Songs: Carols of the Nativity (1958), The First Noel: Animal Songs of the Nativity (1958), and Where Birds Sing (1959, with Freda Reiter). She also edited Thomas Henry Huxley's Autobiography and Selected Essays (1909), the Riverside Essays series (1913, 1914), and a collection of Katherine Irene Glascock's poetry.

Snell was a member of the Modern Language Association and the National Council of Teachers of English. In 1942 she was honored by the Mount Holyoke Alumnae Association with a medal, and the citation "One of the great teachers of Mount Holyoke tradition. She explored the difficult field of metrical structure with the spirit of a scientist."

== Personal life ==
Snell died in 1972, aged 101 years.
