= Maria Abbey =

Nurse during the American Civil War

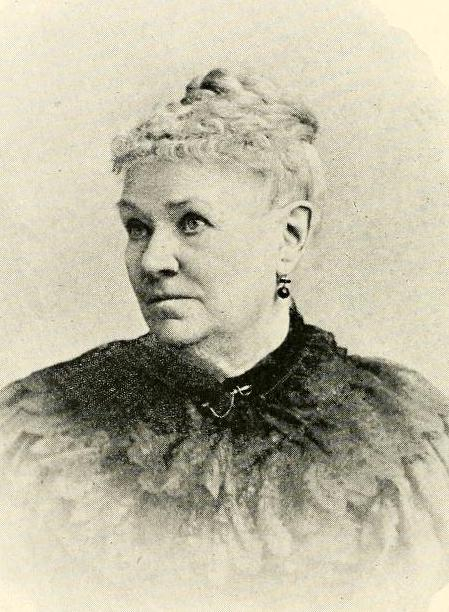
- Maria W. Abbey, from an 1897 publication.
- Born: Maria N. Young; December 17, 1816; Geneva, New York
- Died: April 13, 1903 (aged 86); Brooklyn, New York

Maria N. Abbey (née Young; December 17, 1816 – April 13, 1903) was an American nurse during the American Civil War.

== Biography ==
The daughter of Aaron Young, Maria N. Abbey was born and educated in Geneva, New York. She and her husband moved to Brooklyn, New York, in 1845.

In Mary G. Holland's collection of letters from Civil War nurses, titled, Our Army Nurses: Stories from Women in the Civil War, Abbey recounts her experience as a wartime nurse. She was called to the service after hearing Reverend H. W. Beecher speak at Plymouth Church of the duty of women to help during the war. She heard this sermon in April 1861, the Sunday after the battle at Fort Sumter, and enlisted with six other women by the first day of May. These women were some of the first to respond to the call for nurses.

Her service began at Union Hospital at Georgetown. Immediately, Abbey noticed the lack of structure and organization of the hospital, largely due to the immense need for help. Ultimately, the hospital environment proved to be too much physical and emotional stress for Abbey, who left September 3, 1861.

This did not stop Abbey from aiding the war effort. Abbey opened her own home to be used as a private hospital for two years, maintained by herself. The house continued to operate as a hospital even after Abbey moved. She reportedly never expected payment for her services.

In her later years, Abbey was chaplain for the Ladies' Relief Corps, an auxiliary to the McPherson-Doane Post of the Grand Army of the Republic.

Activities in Abbey's personal life included singing in church choirs.

Abbey died in Brooklyn on April 13, 1903, and was buried in Buffalo, New York.
