= Olaf Karthaus =

German chemist (born 1963)

Olaf Karthaus (born 1963 in Koblenz) is a German polymer chemist and Professor at the Chitose Institute of Science and Technology in Chitose, Hokkaidō, Japan, researching polymer chemistry, thin films, photonics, and nanotechnology.

Karthaus received a PhD from Johannes Gutenberg University of Mainz in Mainz, Germany, in 1992 under the supervision of Helmut Ringsdorf. From 1992 to 1993 he worked as a post-doctoral fellow of the Japan Society for the Promotion of Science (JSPS) and the Alexander von Humboldt Foundation at Tohoku University. He then served as a research assistant from 1994 to 2000 at the Research Institute for Electronic Science at Hokkaido University in Sapporo.

Karthaus was a co-plaintiff with Debito Arudou and Kenneth Sutherland in an anti-discrimination lawsuit against a hot spring (onsen) in Otaru, Japan, that refused entry to individuals with foreign appearance even if they were Japanese citizens.

Karthaus's wife, Yuki Karthaus (カートハウス由希, Kātohausu Yuki), received a personal reply to a letter written to Katsumaro Yamada (山田 勝麿, Yamada Katsumaro), the mayor of Otaru, in 1999.

== Selected publications ==
He has authored or coauthored 54 peer-reviewed articles in scientific journals: according to Science Citation Index, the ones that have been the most cited are:

- Karthaus, Olaf; Norihiko Maruyama; Xavier Cieren; Masatsugu Shimomura; Hirokazu Hasegawa; Takeji Hashimoto (2000). "Water-Assisted Formation Of Micrometer-Size Honeycomb Patterns Of Polymers". Langmuir. 16 (15): 6071–6076. doi:10.1021/la0001732. (cited 116 times)
- Karthaus, Olaf; Lars Gråsjö; Norihiko Maruyama; Masatsugu Shimomura (1999). "Formation Of Ordered Mesoscopic Polymer Arrays By Dewetting". Chaos. 9 (2): 308–314. Bibcode:1999Chaos...9..308K. doi:10.1063/1.166407. PMID 12779828. (cited 72 times)
- Maruyama, Norihiko; T. Koito; J. Nishida; T. Sawadishu; Xavier Cieren; K. Ijiro; Olaf Karthaus; Masatsugu Shimomura (1998). "Mesoscopic Patterns Of Molecular Aggregates On Solid Substrates". Thin Solid Films. 329: 854–856. Bibcode:1998TSF...327..854M. doi:10.1016/S0040-6090(98)00777-9. (cited 67 times)
- Karthaus, Olaf; H. Ringsdorf; V.V. Tsukruk; J.H. Wendorff (1992). "Columnar Ordering Of Liquid-Crystalline Discotics In Langmuir-Blodgett-Films". Langmuir. 8 (9): 2279–2283. doi:10.1021/la00045a034. (cited 65 times)
- Bengs, H.; O. Karthaus; J. Ringsdorf; C. Baehr; M. Ebert; J.H. Wendorff (1991). "Induction Of A Nematic Columnar Phase In A Discotic Hexagonal Ordered Phase Forming System". Liquid Crystals. 10 (2): 161–168. Bibcode:1991LoCr...10..161B. doi:10.1080/02678299108036422. (cited 44 times)
