= Naples Central School District =

School district in the U.S. state of New York

Naples Central Schools

Location
- Naples, New York Finger Lakes United States

District information
- Grades: K-12
- Superintendent: Kevin Swartz
- Schools: 2

Students and staff
- Teachers: 91
- Staff: 251
- Athletic conference: Section V
- District mascot: Big Green
- Colors: Green and White

Other information
- Website: www.naplescsd.org

Naples Central School District is a school district in Naples, New York, United States. The superintendent is Kevin Swartz. The district operates two schools: Naples Junior Senior High School and Naples Elementary School. The District offices are located 136 North Main Street.

== Naples Junior/Senior High School ==
Naples Junior/Senior High School
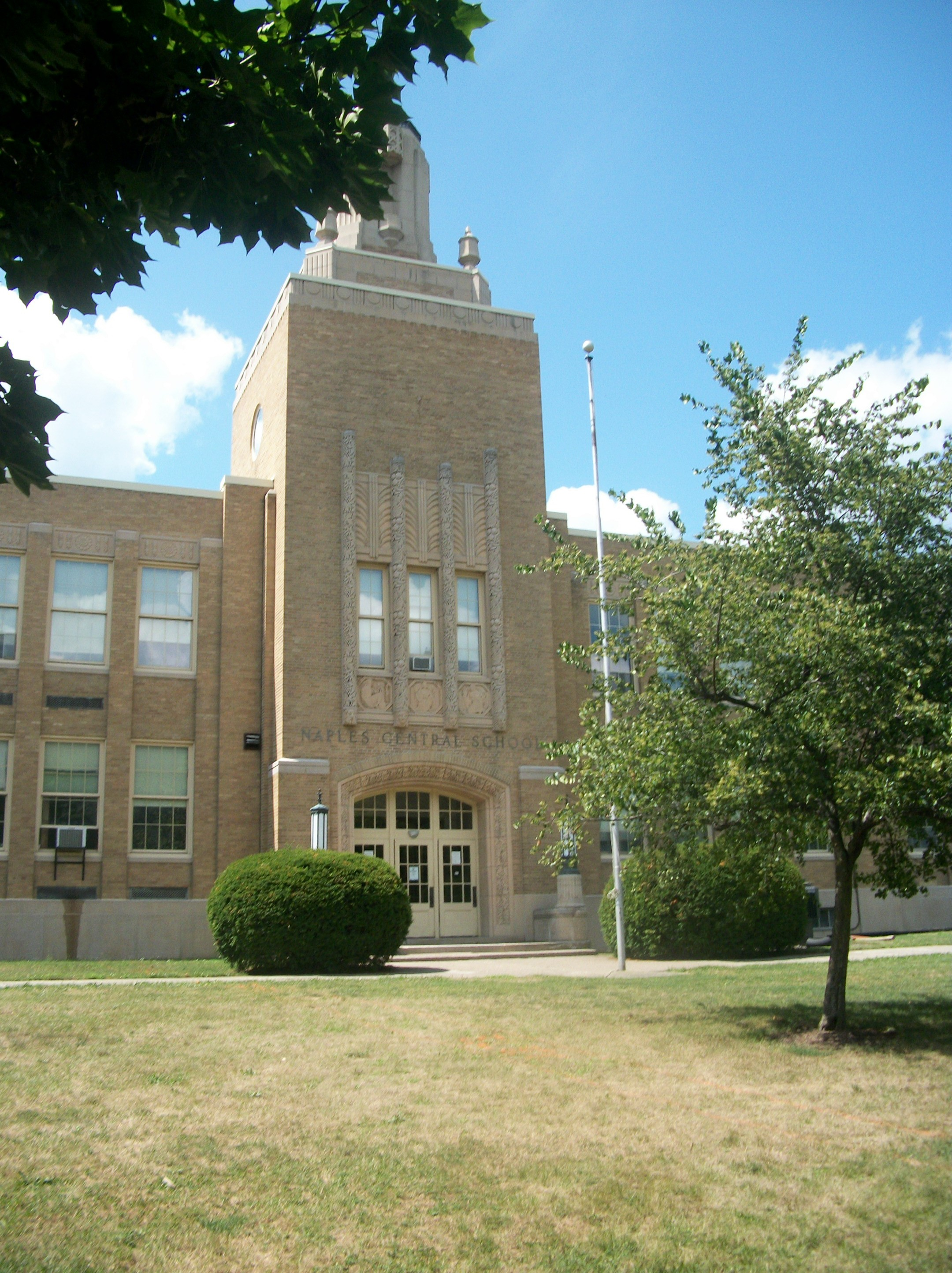

Information
- Principal: Nicole Green
- Grades: 7-12
- Website: Naples Junior/Senior High

Naples Junior/Senior High School is located at 136 North Main Street and serves grades 7 through 12. The current principal is Mrs. Nicole Green.

=== History ===
Naples Junior/Senior High School was constructed in 1880. It was named "Naples Academy" and served grades K-12. Eventually, it split into a 7-12 school while younger students attended the elementary school.

==== Former alumni ====
- Meghan Musnicki–Olympic Gold Medalist in Rowing

== Naples Elementary School ==
Naples Elementary School
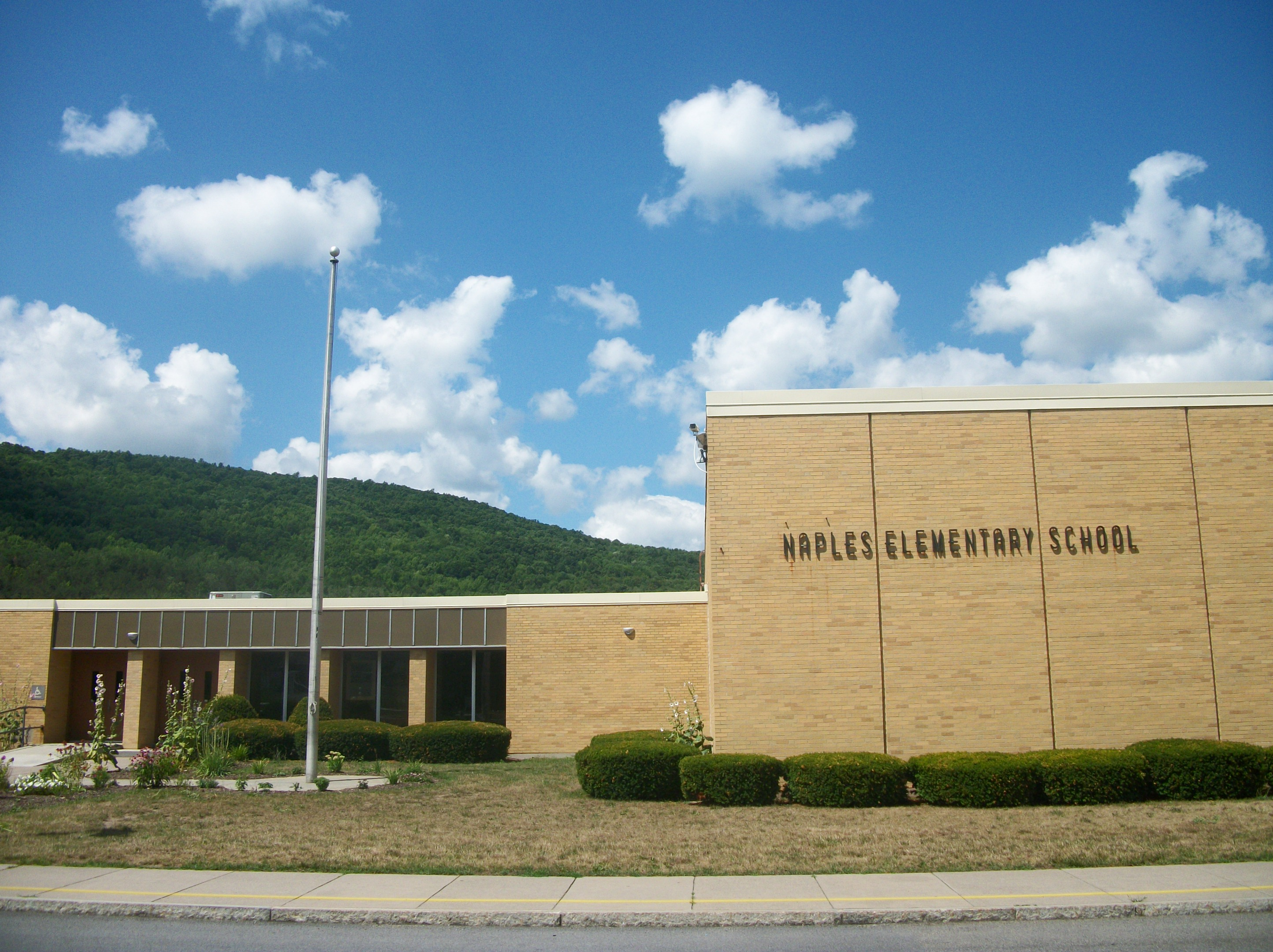

Information
- Principal: Katherine Piedici
- Staff: 128
- Teaching staff: 42
- Grades: K-6
- Website: Naples Elementary School

Naples Elementary School is located at 2 Academy Street and serves grades K through 6. The current principal is Katherine Piedici.
