= Geneva High School (New York) =

Coordinates: 42°52′44″N 76°59′31″W

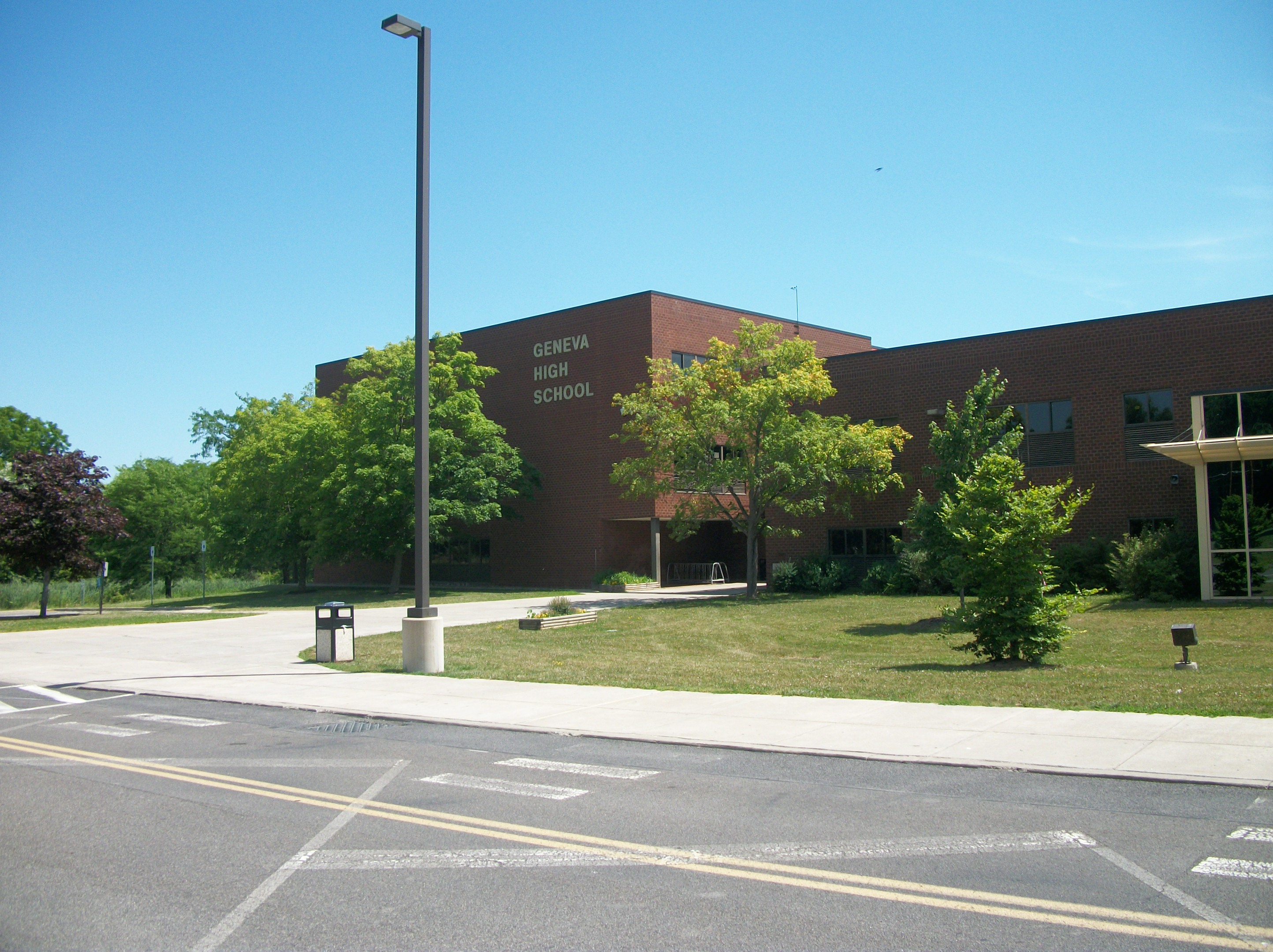

Location
- 101 Carter Road; Finger Lakes; Geneva, (Ontario County), New York 14456; United States

Information
- Type: Public, coeducational
- School board: Geneva School Board
- School district: Geneva City School District
- Superintendent: Trina Smith Newton
- Principal: Gregory Baker
- Teaching staff: 59.50 (FTE)
- Grades: 9-12
- Student to teacher ratio: 10.12
- Colors: Red and black
- Athletics conference: Section V
- Mascot: Panther
- Accreditation: Finger Lakes League, Section V, NYSPHSAA
- USNWR ranking: 1. 139870
- Test average: 3.5
- Yearbook: The Seneca Saga
- Website: Geneva High

Geneva High School is a public high school located in Geneva, New York, United States. The school serves grades 9-12 and is a part of the Geneva City School District. The principal is Gregory Baker, the assistant principal is Timothy Baker, and the associate principal is Tricia Budgar.

== History ==
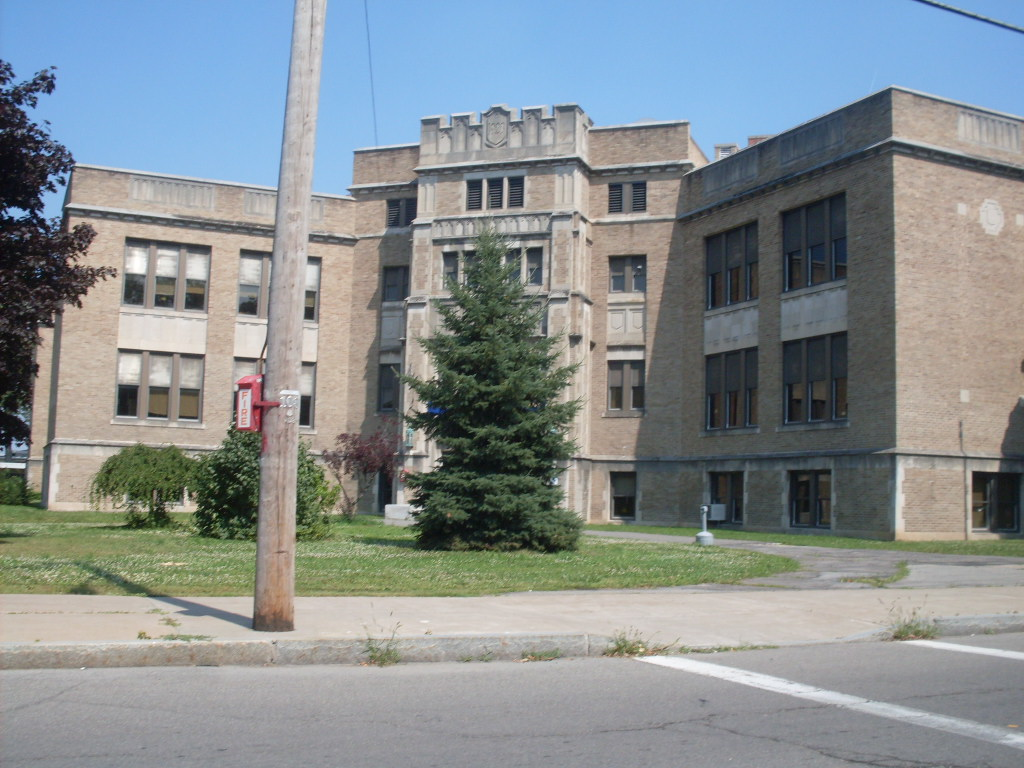
Geneva High School (1926-1981)

Relatively little is known about the early history of Geneva public schools. On June 19, 1812, the New York State legislature passed an act for the establishment of Common Schools which became the basis of the common school system in the state. The date of the first public school established in Geneva in compliance with this act was in 1815. Subsequently, several schools were established in Geneva.

In 1853, the Geneva Union School was incorporated and authorized to maintain a classical department and to instruct a normal class. In 1863, Geneva schools were desegregated. On March 16, 1869, the Union School's corporate title was changed to "The Geneva Classical and Union School." It was the first Union School built in New York State.

In 1924-1925, a commodious high school building was built at the corner of Milton and Pulteney Streets in the City of Geneva. The school was erected on the grounds formerly occupied by a cemetery, the bodies from which were exhumed and removed to Glenwood Cemetery.

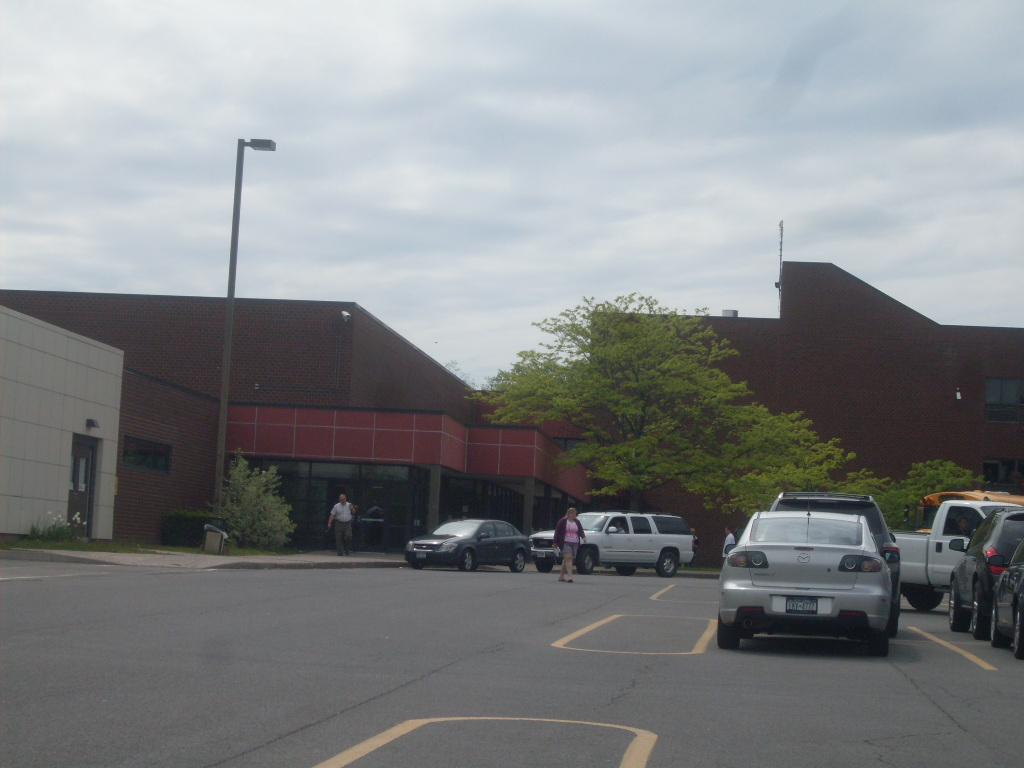
Geneva High's rear entrance

In 1981, the high school was moved to its present location at 101 Carter Road in the City of Geneva.

== Athletics ==
Geneva High School is a member of the Finger Lakes League, Section V, and the New York State Public High School Athletic Association. The school's athletic teams are named the Panthers, and the school colors are black and red.

On November 6, 1900, the Geneva High School football team set a football scoring record, defeating Weedsport High School 109 to 0 on Hobart Field in Geneva.

== Past principals ==
- Lewis Collins (1921-1950)
- S. Wuertenberger (1951-1971)
- Vince Scalise (1971-1985)
- Ed Signa (1985-1994)
- Brian Mazza (1994-1997)
- Mike Simon (1997-2004)
- Ann Goldfarb (2004-2005)
- Dave Pullen (2005-2007)
- Bill Rotenberg (2007-2011)
- Greg Baker (2011-)

== Notable alumni ==
- Debito Arudou/Dave Aldwinckle '83 – Japan activist and author
- Jasper Collins '09 – NFL wide receiver for the Miami Dolphins, CFL Wide Receiver for the Hamilton Tigercats
- Lauren Holly '81 – actress
- Travie McCoy '99 – co-founder of Gym Class Heroes
- Matt McGinley '01 – co-founder of Gym Class Heroes
- Scott LaFaro '54 – jazz double bassist
