= Geneva, New York =

Geneva
- City
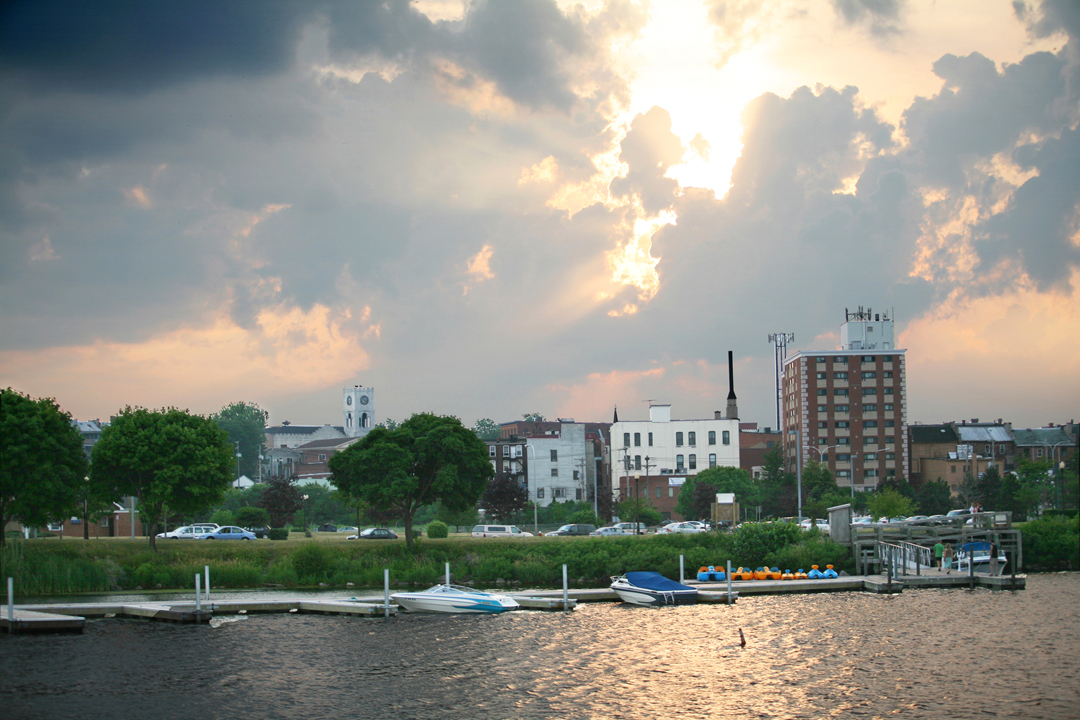

- Location within the state of New York
- Coordinates: 42°52′44″N 76°59′35″W
- Country: United States
- State: New York
- County: Ontario, Seneca

Government
  - Type: Council-Manager
  - Mayor: Jim Cecere (D)
  - City Manager: Taylor Youngs
  - City Council: Members' List: • W1: Christopher Lavin (D); • W2: Ben Gummoe (D); • W3: Patrick Grimaldi (R); • W4: Peter Gillotte (D); • W5: James Petropoulos (D); • W6: Jaime Kaime Jr. (D); At-Large Members: • Ahmad Whitfield (D); • John Brennan (D)

Area
  - Total: 5.85 sq mi (15.14 km^{2})
  - Land: 4.21 sq mi (10.91 km^{2})
  - Water: 1.63 sq mi (4.23 km^{2})

Population (2020)
  - Total: 12,812
  - Density: 3,040.2/sq mi (1,173.84/km^{2})
- ZIP code: 14456
- Area codes: 315 and 585
- FIPS code: 36-28640
- GNIS feature ID: 0978993
- Website: www.cityofgenevany.gov

Geneva is a city in Ontario and Seneca counties in the U.S. state of New York. It is at the northern end of Seneca Lake; all land portions of the city are within Ontario County; the water portions are in Seneca County. The population was 12,812 at the 2020 census. The city is supposedly named after the city and canton of Geneva in Switzerland. The main settlement of the Seneca was spelled Zoneshio by early European settlers, and was described as being two miles north of Seneca Lake.

The city borders the town of Geneva and was once a part of it. The city identifies as the "Lake Trout Capital of the World."

== History ==
The area was long occupied by the Seneca tribe, which had established a major village of Kanadaseaga here by 1687. The British helped fortify the village against the French of Canada during the Seven Years' War (locally known as the French and Indian War); later they added defensive fortifications against the Americans during the Revolutionary War. During the latter warfare, the punitive Sullivan Expedition of 1779 mounted by rebel forces destroyed many of the dwellings, as well as the winter stores of the people, and they abandoned the ruins. Following the war and the forced removal of the Seneca from their native land, European-Americans settled here about 1793. They developed a town encouraged by the Pulteney Association, which owned the land and was selling plots.

At the end of the Revolutionary War, Lt. Col. Seth Reed (né Read), who had fought at Bunker Hill, was one of many pioneers who moved from Massachusetts into Ontario County. By trade with the Seneca, he bought a tract of land eighteen miles in extent. This occurred in 1787, while his wife Hannah stayed in Uxbridge, Massachusetts, with their family. (This was before the first Trade and Intercourse Act, or Nonintercourse Act, was passed in 1790, formally declaring that land sales to individuals were invalid unless they occurred during a public treaty held under the authority of the United States.) "Seth Read moved his wife Hannah and their family to Geneva, Ontario County, New York, in the winter of 1790".

The settlement at Geneva was not yet permanent; the European Americans continued to harass the Seneca on the frontier. In 1795 Read and his family removed to Erie, Pennsylvania, where they became its earliest European-American settlers.

The Village of Geneva was incorporated in 1806, formally separating it from the surrounding area of Geneva Town. Later the village became a city through a 1871 charter.

In the 1830s, a government surveyor named John Brink named both Geneva Lake and Lake Geneva in Wisconsin after Geneva, New York. Geneva, Nebraska, founded in 1871, is considered to have been named after the one in New York, rather than directly for the Swiss city.

== Geography ==
The town is at the 2 miles (3.2 km) wide northern outlet of Seneca Lake, a lake that spans 38 miles (61 km) south to Watkins Glen. Geneva is in the Finger Lakes region, the largest wine-producing area in New York State. The Cayuga-Seneca Canal is part of the watershed of Keuka Lake. It flows north through Geneva, connecting to the Erie Canal, which was completed in 1825, giving access for the region to the Great Lakes and midwestern markets for their produce, as well as to buy natural resource commodities.

According to the United States Census Bureau, the city has a total area of 5.8 square miles (15 km^{2}). 4.3 square miles (11 km^{2}) of it is land and 1.6 square miles (4.1 km^{2}) of it (27.18%) is water.

Geneva is connected via the east–west US 20, concurrent with NY 5. NY 14 is a north–south highway through the city. It is approximately equidistant from Rochester and Syracuse, each being about 45 miles away.

=== Climate ===
According to the Köppen Climate Classification system, Geneva has a warm-summer humid continental climate, abbreviated "Dfb" on climate maps. The hottest temperature recorded in Geneva was 99 °F (37.2 °C) on July 22, 2011, while the coldest temperature recorded was −16 °F (−26.7 °C) on February 18, 1979, and January 22, 2005.

Climate data for Geneva, New York, 1991–2020 normals, extremes 1969–present
Month	Jan	Feb	Mar	Apr	May	Jun	Jul	Aug	Sep	Oct	Nov	Dec	Year
Record high °F (°C)	67 (19)	69 (21)	84 (29)	89 (32)	93 (34)	96 (36)	99 (37)	97 (36)	95 (35)	86 (30)	78 (26)	70 (21)	99 (37)
Mean maximum °F (°C)	55.3 (12.9)	52.8 (11.6)	64.8 (18.2)	78.9 (26.1)	85.4 (29.7)	89.5 (31.9)	90.8 (32.7)	89.3 (31.8)	87.4 (30.8)	78.3 (25.7)	68.0 (20.0)	56.6 (13.7)	92.5 (33.6)
Mean daily maximum °F (°C)	30.4 (−0.9)	32.2 (0.1)	40.0 (4.4)	53.7 (12.1)	66.6 (19.2)	75.1 (23.9)	79.4 (26.3)	77.8 (25.4)	71.2 (21.8)	58.5 (14.7)	46.4 (8.0)	35.9 (2.2)	55.6 (13.1)
Daily mean °F (°C)	23.1 (−4.9)	24.5 (−4.2)	31.9 (−0.1)	44.2 (6.8)	56.5 (13.6)	65.6 (18.7)	70.0 (21.1)	68.4 (20.2)	61.3 (16.3)	49.9 (9.9)	38.9 (3.8)	29.4 (−1.4)	47.0 (8.3)
Mean daily minimum °F (°C)	15.8 (−9.0)	16.7 (−8.5)	23.9 (−4.5)	34.8 (1.6)	46.4 (8.0)	56.0 (13.3)	60.6 (15.9)	59.0 (15.0)	51.5 (10.8)	41.3 (5.2)	31.5 (−0.3)	22.9 (−5.1)	38.4 (3.5)
Mean minimum °F (°C)	−2.8 (−19.3)	−0.5 (−18.1)	6.7 (−14.1)	23.5 (−4.7)	34.1 (1.2)	43.8 (6.6)	51.0 (10.6)	48.9 (9.4)	38.9 (3.8)	30.1 (−1.1)	18.6 (−7.4)	6.9 (−13.9)	−5.5 (−20.8)
Record low °F (°C)	−16 (−27)	−16 (−27)	−7 (−22)	10 (−12)	27 (−3)	36 (2)	44 (7)	40 (4)	30 (−1)	21 (−6)	4 (−16)	−12 (−24)	−16 (−27)
Average precipitation inches (mm)	1.79 (45)	1.58 (40)	2.40 (61)	2.76 (70)	3.27 (83)	3.63 (92)	3.73 (95)	3.49 (89)	3.26 (83)	3.83 (97)	2.55 (65)	2.32 (59)	34.61 (879)
Average snowfall inches (cm)	13.5 (34)	13.3 (34)	12.8 (33)	1.8 (4.6)	0.0 (0.0)	0.0 (0.0)	0.0 (0.0)	0.0 (0.0)	0.0 (0.0)	0.1 (0.25)	4.7 (12)	10.4 (26)	56.6 (143.85)
Average extreme snow depth inches (cm)	9.7 (25)	9.9 (25)	10.5 (27)	1.4 (3.6)	0.0 (0.0)	0.0 (0.0)	0.0 (0.0)	0.0 (0.0)	0.0 (0.0)	0.1 (0.25)	3.1 (7.9)	6.2 (16)	15.5 (39)
Average precipitation days (≥ 0.01 in)	13.9	11.3	12.0	12.5	13.2	12.7	12.0	12.2	12.4	15.5	12.3	12.7	152.7
Average snowy days (≥ 0.1 in)	8.9	8.6	5.7	1.3	0.0	0.0	0.0	0.0	0.0	0.1	2.7	6.6	33.9
Source 1: NOAA
Source 2: National Weather Service

== Demographics ==
Historical population
Census	Pop.	Note	%±
1870	5,521		—
1880	5,878		6.5%
1890	7,557		28.6%
1900	10,433		38.1%
1910	12,446		19.3%
1920	14,846		19.3%
1930	16,053		8.1%
1940	15,555		−3.1%
1950	17,144		10.2%
1960	17,286		0.8%
1970	16,793		−2.9%
1980	15,133		−9.9%
1990	14,143		−6.5%
2000	13,617		−3.7%
2010	13,261		−2.6%
2020	12,812		−3.4%
U.S. Decennial Census

=== 2020 census ===
As of the 2020 census, Geneva had a population of 12,812. The median age was 33.3 years. 17.9% of residents were under the age of 18 and 15.9% of residents were 65 years of age or older. For every 100 females there were 91.4 males, and for every 100 females age 18 and over there were 90.4 males age 18 and over.

100.0% of residents lived in urban areas, while 0.0% lived in rural areas.

There were 5,026 households in Geneva, of which 24.3% had children under the age of 18 living in them. Of all households, 30.0% were married-couple households, 23.8% were households with a male householder and no spouse or partner present, and 35.7% were households with a female householder and no spouse or partner present. About 40.1% of all households were made up of individuals and 15.7% had someone living alone who was 65 years of age or older.

There were 5,612 housing units, of which 10.4% were vacant. The homeowner vacancy rate was 1.8% and the rental vacancy rate was 6.9%.

Racial composition as of the 2020 census
Race	Number	Percent
White	9,105	71.1%
Black or African American	1,122	8.8%
American Indian and Alaska Native	26	0.2%
Asian	249	1.9%
Native Hawaiian and Other Pacific Islander	6	0.0%
Some other race	1,101	8.6%
Two or more races	1,203	9.4%
Hispanic or Latino (of any race)	2,217	17.3%

=== 2000 census ===
As of the 2000 census, there were 13,617 people, 5,014 households, and 2,933 families residing in the city. The population density was 3,199.5 inhabitants per square mile (1,235.3/km^{2}). There were 5,564 housing units at an average density of 1,307.4 units per square mile (504.8 units/km^{2}). The racial makeup of the city was 81.52% White, 10.22% African American, 0.25% Native American, 1.23% Asian, 0.05% Pacific Islander, 3.39% from other races, and 3.34% from two or more races. Hispanic or Latino of any race were 8.50% of the population.

There were 5,014 households, out of which 29.5% had children under the age of 18 living with them, 38.6% were married couples living together, 15.9% had a female householder with no husband present, and 41.5% were non-families. 34.1% of all households were made up of individuals, and 14.8% had someone living alone who was 65 years of age or older. The average household size was 2.35 and the average family size was 3.03.

In the city, the population was spread out, with 23.2% under the age of 18, 18.9% from 18 to 24, 24.3% from 25 to 44, 18.1% from 45 to 64, and 15.5% who were 65 years of age or older. The median age was 32 years. For every 100 females, there were 87.4 males. For every 100 females age 18 and over, there were 84.5 males.

The median income for a household in the city was $31,600, and the median income for a family was $41,224. Males had a median income of $31,315 versus $23,054 for females. The per capita income for the city was $15,609. About 13.7% of families and 17.5% of the population were below the poverty line, including 27.2% of those under age 18 and 7.8% of those age 65 or over.

== Economy ==
One of the major industries in and around Geneva is winemaking. The area is becoming increasingly popular for agritourism: there are over 100 wineries in the Finger Lakes Region, and the Seneca Lake wine trail provides easy access to many of these from Geneva. As Geneva grows as a tourist destination, so does the number of rooms available. Along with this growth, FLX Table opened in 2016 under the vision of a master sommelier, soon after winning the USA Today recognition of best new restaurant in the country. Red Jacket Orchards is also based in Geneva.

In 2015, the National Civic League chose Geneva as one of ten cities from across the country to receive its annual All-America City Award. In June 2017, it was announced Geneva would receive $10 million from New York (state) as part of a downtown revitalization initiative as well as an additional $5 million for a welcome center.

== Government ==
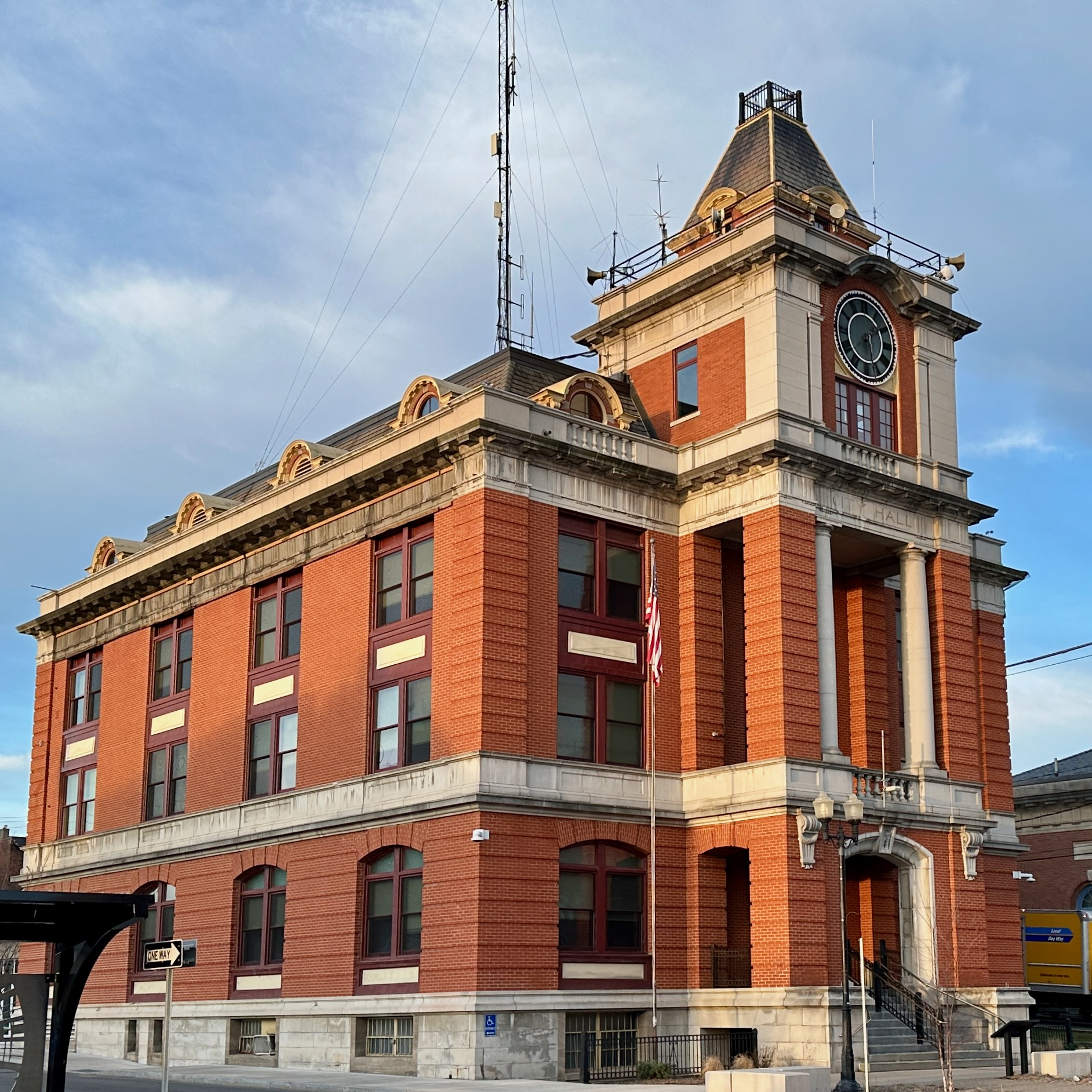
Geneva City Hall

The City of Geneva began using a mayor-council form of government in 1964. The mayor is elected at large. The council consists of eight members. Six are elected from one of six wards. The other two are elected at large. James Cecere is the Mayor of the City of Geneva and Taylor Youngs serves as the acting City Manager. Council began serving on staggered terms in 2024, with Wards 1,3,5 and one at-large elected in one four year cycle and the Mayor, wards 2, 3, 4, and at-large being elected in a separate cycle. Elections occur every other year. The next election will be 2027 for the odd numbered wards.

== Education ==
The Geneva City School District operates the local public primary and secondary schools. The district has two elementary schools, North Street School (3rd-5th) and West Street School (K–2). The district's secondary schools are Geneva Middle School and Geneva High School.

Private schools include:

- Children's Hours School, a private school for pre-school and elementary. The current director is Lauren Glick.
- St. Francis-St. Stephen's School, a Roman Catholic elementary school that teaches grades PreK-6 in Geneva. The current principal is Mrs. Mary Mantelli.
- Rose Academy, a school of Experiential Learning for grades 1–5. The curriculum includes GLOBAL Science, Reading A-Z Program, Touch Point Math, Art, Music, Physical Education. It was founded by Dr. Lorraine Williams.

Colleges and universities include:

- Hobart and William Smith Colleges, the successor institution to Geneva College.
- The New York State Agricultural Experiment Station of Cornell University's College of Agriculture and Life Sciences.
- Finger Lakes Community College has two campuses in Geneva: the Geneva Campus Center and the Viticulture and Wine Center.

== Arts and culture ==
=== The Dove Block ===
The Dove Block is a notable art center in Geneva. Having been commissioned by William G. Dove, it was designed and built by Rochester architect Andrew Jackson Warner in 1878. It was once the workshop of notable American modernist and abstract painter Arthur Dove, but has since been renovated to serve the community by offering lessons, promoting local artists, and serving as a for-rent venue space.

=== Historic Geneva ===
Historic Geneva is a historical society overseeing the Geneva History Museum, Rose Hill Mansion, and the John Johnston House. Dating back to 1883, the society first received a provisional charter as the Geneva Historical Society in 1905, before being granted a permanent charter in 1957. In 2021, it was renamed Historic Geneva.

=== The Smith Opera House ===
The Smith Opera House, often referred to simply as "The Smith" is a theater with a capacity of 1,400 spectators located in Geneva's downtown. Its construction was originally commissioned by notable Geneva resident William Smith, and opened its doors for the first time in 1894. Despite the name, the theater is not limited to opera productions, but instead frequently hosts a myriad of plays, orchestral performances, and films.

== Notable people ==
- Maria Abbey – nurse during the American Civil War
- Debito Arudou – writer, blogger, and human rights activist
- Elizabeth Blackwell – physician and the first woman to earn a medical degree in the United States
- Robert Stanley Breed – biologist who served as head of bacteriology at the New York Agricultural Experiment Station
- Sara Miranda Maxson Cobb – art teacher, artist, and writer
- Maria Cook – first woman to be recognized as a Universalist preacher
- Cynthia DeFelice – children's book author
- Mike Diana – underground cartoonist
- Timothy DiDuro – drummer for the rock bands Skid Row and Slaughter
- Peter M. Dox, former U.S. Congressman for the 5th District of Alabama
- Arthur Dove – artist
- Charles J. Folger – lawyer and politician
- Rocky Fratto – champion boxer known as "The Pride of Geneva"
- Libby Gill – speaker, executive coach, and author
- Steve Golin – film producer and founder of Anonymous Content; won an Academy Award for Best Picture at the 2016 Academy Awards for Spotlight
- Gym Class Heroes – rap rock band
- Michael Hashim – jazz alto and soprano saxophonist
- Thomas Hillhouse – farmer, banker, and politician
- U.P. Hedrick – botanist and horticulturist at the New York State Agricultural Experiment Station
- Robert Holley – biochemist affiliated with Experiment Station who won the Nobel Prize Winner in 1968
- John H. Hobart – third Episcopal bishop of New York; founder of Geneva College (predecessor of Hobart College); namesake of Hobart, Wisconsin
- Lauren Holly – actress
- David Hudson – lawyer, writer, and politician
- Luther Sage "Yellowstone" Kelly – soldier, hunter, scout, adventurer, and administrator
- Michael Muhammad Knight – novelist, essayist, journalist, and convert to Islam
- Scott LaFaro – jazz double bassist known for his work with the Bill Evans Trio
- Christine Lavin – singer-songwriter and promoter of contemporary folk music
- Travie McCoy – rapper, singer, and songwriter; co-founder and lead vocalist of the Gym Class Heroes
- John Kemp Mizner – US Army brigadier general
- John Nicholas – lawyer, farmer, and politician; US Congressman from 1793 to 1801
- Robert Nicholas – politician and New York Congressman from 1839 to 1842
- Rhoda Palmer – suffragist, abolitionist and longest surviving signer of the Declaration of Sentiments
- John Raines – lawyer and politician who was a US Congressman from 1889 to 1893
- Seth Reed – pioneer who fought at Bunker Hill; early settler of Geneva and Erie, Pennsylvania
- Robert L. Rose – politician and US Congressman from 1847 to 1851
- William Smith – businessman and namesake of William Smith College
- Ada L. F. Snell – poet and college professor
- Otto Stern – inventor of Miracle-Gro
- Mark Thornton – economist, author, and politician
- Jerry Wall – soldier in the Civil War who received the Medal of Honor
- Marshall P. Wilder – actor, monologist, humorist, and sketch artist
- Wilmer & the Dukes – R&B band
- William W. Wright – politician
- John Zakour – science-fiction and humor writer
- Michael E. Conley – United States Air Force lieutenant general
