= Debito Arudou =

Author/activist with Japanese citizenship born in the USA

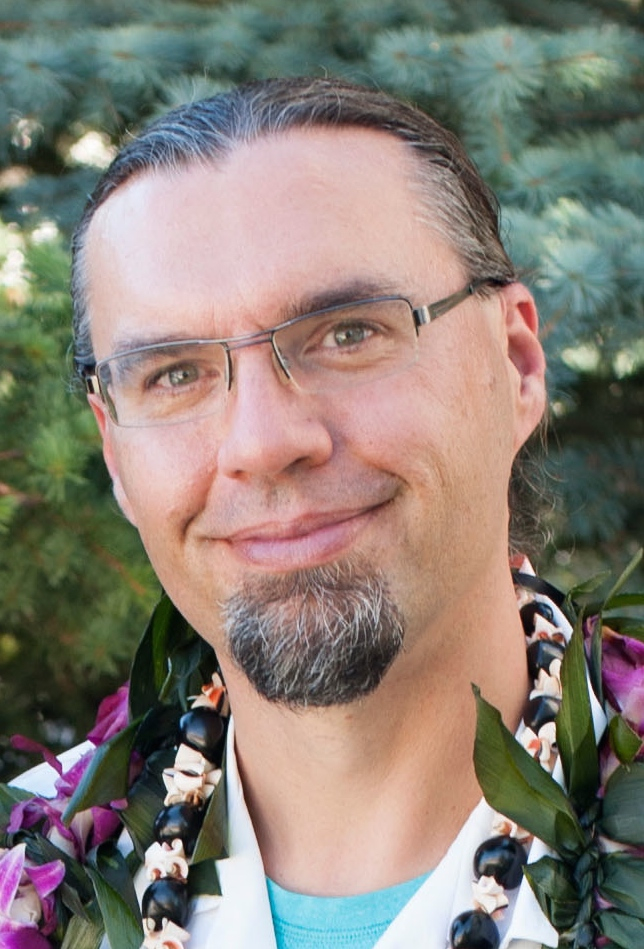
- Debito Arudou in 2014
- Born: David Christopher Schofill; January 13, 1965 (age 61); California, United States
- Other names: David Christopher Aldwinckle, Sugawara Arudōdebito, Debito Beamer
- Education: Cornell University (BA) 1987; University of California, San Diego (MA) 1991; Meiji Gakuin University (PhD) 2014
- Known for: Human rights activism
- Website: debito.org

Debito Arudou (有道 出人, Arudō Debito; born David Christopher Schofill on January 13, 1965) is an American-born Japanese writer, blogger, and human rights activist. He was born in the United States and became a naturalized Japanese citizen in 2000. Arudou has since left Japan after living in the country for over 20 years.

Arudou currently is employed as a part-time lecturer in political science at California State University, Long Beach.

== Background ==
=== Early life and academic career ===
Arudou was born David Christopher Schofill in California in 1965. He was raised in Geneva, New York, and became "David Christopher Aldwinckle" when his stepfather adopted him in the 1970s. He graduated from Cornell University in 1987, dedicating his senior year to studying Japanese after visiting his pen pal and future wife in Japan. Aldwinckle moved to Japan for one year where he taught English in Sapporo, Hokkaido, and later spent one year at the Japan Management Academy in Nagaoka, Niigata Prefecture, before returning to complete a Master's of Pacific International Affairs (MPIA) at the University of California, San Diego (UCSD).

In 1993, Arudou joined the faculty of Business Administration and Information Science at the Hokkaido Information University, a private university in Ebetsu, Hokkaido, where he taught courses in business English and debate. He was an associate professor until 2011 when he left the university. From 2012 to 2013, Arudou was an Affiliate Scholar at the East–West Center in Honolulu, Hawai'i. Meiji Gakuin University awarded him a Doctorate in Philosophy (International Studies) in 2014.

=== Family and Japanese naturalization ===
Aldwinckle married a Japanese citizen in 1989, and they have two daughters. Aldwinckle became a permanent resident of Japan in 1996. He became a naturalized Japanese citizen in 2000. On becoming Japanese, he changed his name to Arudoudebito Sugawara (菅原 有道出人, Sugawara Arudōdebito), taking his wife's surname. They divorced in 2006.

== Activism ==
=== Arudou v. Earth Cure ===
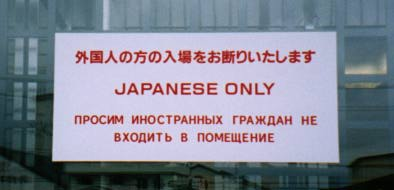
The "Japanese only" sign at the Yunohana Onsen as it appeared in 1999

Arudou objected to the policies of three bathhouses in Hokkaido in the late 1990s that had posted "No Foreigners" or "Japanese Only" signs on their doors.

Arudou led a multinational group of 17 people of various nationalities (United States, Chinese, German, and Japanese) to enter the Yunohana bathhouse in Otaru and test the firmness of the "No Foreigners" policy posted on its door. The group attempted the walk-ins twice.

Arudou returned to Yunohana in October 2000 for the third time as a naturalized Japanese citizen, but was again denied entry. The manager acknowledged that Arudou was a Japanese national but refused him entry because Arudou's foreign appearance could drive Japanese customers to take their business elsewhere. Yunohana had previously closed its bathhouse due to a decline in Japanese customers caused by the poor bathing habits of Russian sailors, and to prevent a repeat of this situation, the company refused entry to anyone who appeared to be a foreign national.

In February 2001, Arudou and two co-plaintiffs, Kenneth Lee Sutherland and Olaf Karthaus, sued Earth Cure in district court, pleading racial discrimination, and the City of Otaru for violation of the International Convention on the Elimination of All Forms of Racial Discrimination, a treaty Japan ratified in 1996. On November 11, 2002, the Sapporo District Court ordered Earth Cure to pay the plaintiffs ¥1 million in damages each. The court stated that "categorically refusing all foreigners constitutes irrational discrimination, exceeds social norms, and amounts to an illegal act". The Sapporo District and High Courts both dismissed Arudou's claim against the city of Otaru for not creating an anti-discrimination ordinance. It stated that "issues such as which measures to take, and how to implement them, are properly left to the discretion of Otaru". The Sapporo High Court upheld these rulings on September 16, 2004, and the Supreme Court of Japan denied review on April 7, 2005.

=== Other protests ===
In 2003, Arudou and several other long-term foreign residents dressed up as seals to protest the granting of an honorary jūminhyō (residency registration) to Tama-chan, a male bearded seal, in Nishi Ward, Yokohama. The protesters asserted that if the government could grant jūminhyō to animals and animation characters, as was the case in Niiza and Kasukabe in Saitama Prefecture, then there was no need to deny foreign residents the same. At the time, non-Japanese residents were registered in a separate alien registration system.

In February 2007, Arudou participated in a protest against an over-the-counter Japanese language publication titled Kyōgaku no Gaijin Hanzai Ura File – Gaijin Hanzai Hakusho 2007 ("Secret Files of Foreigners' Crimes"). The magazine highlighted crimes committed by foreigners. Arudou, calling the magazine "ignorant propaganda" that "focuses exclusively on the bad things that some foreigners do, but has absolutely nothing about crimes committed by Japanese". Arudou posted a bilingual letter for readers to take to FamilyMart stores protesting discrimination against non-Japanese residents of Japan.

In June 2008, Arudou lodged a complaint with the Hokkaido Prefectural Police that its officers were targeting foreigners as part of a security sweep prior to the 34th G8 summit in Tōyako, Hokkaido. This followed an incident where Arudou asserted his right under the Police Execution of Duties Law to not need to show identification when requested by a police officer at New Chitose Airport. After meeting with police representatives at their headquarters, Arudou held a press conference covered by a local television station.

In August 2009, Arudou—acting as the chair of FRANCA (the Foreign Residents and Naturalized Citizens Association)—began a letter-writing campaign to protest an advertisement by McDonald's Japan featuring a bespectacled, mildly geeky, 43-year-old American Japanophile known as Mr. James—a burger mascot who proclaims his love for the fast-food outlet in broken katakana Japanese. Writing in The Japan Times, Arudou argued that the "Mr. James" campaign perpetuates negative stereotypes about non-Japanese Caucasian minorities living in Japan, and demanded that McDonald's Japan withdraw the advertisement.

== Publications ==
Arudou had a book published about the 1999 Otaru hot springs incident, originally in Japanese, and then in 2004 in an expanded English version, Japanese Only – The Otaru Hot Springs Case and Racial Discrimination in Japan (ジャパニーズ・オンリー―小樽温泉入浴拒否問題と人種差別, Japanīzu Onrī – Otaru Onsen Nyūyoku Kyohi Mondai to Jinshu Sabetsu). The book is listed in the Japan Policy Research Institute's recommended library on Japan.

Arudou's next book, published in 2008, was coauthored with Akira Higuchi (樋口 彰) and titled Handbook for Newcomers, Migrants and Immigrants to Japan (ニューカマー定住ハンドブック). This bilingual book provides information on visas, starting businesses, securing jobs, resolving legal problems, and planning for the future from entry into Japan to death. Handbook came out in 2012 in an updated 2nd Edition and an ebook version in 2013.

Arudou has written a monthly column for the Community section of The Japan Times titled "Just Be Cause" since 2008, and has contributed occasional opinion columns to the newspaper since 2002. He was also a columnist for the Japan Today website and has been featured in The Asahi Evening News.

In 2011, Arudou self-published his first novella titled In Appropriate: a novel of culture, kidnapping, and revenge in modern Japan. The novella tells the story of a transnational marriage, culture shock, and child abduction. In 2015 he published Embedded Racism on the politics, policies, and perils of the exclusionist national identity of Japan through the Lexington Books imprint of The Globe Pequot Publishing Group.

Arudou has published twice in Fodor's Japan Travel Guide, in 2012 (Hokkaido Chapter) and 2014 (Hokkaido and Tohoku Chapters). He has also published academic papers in The Asia-Pacific Journal: Japan Focus and other peer-reviewed journals in the interdisciplinary field of Asia-Pacific Studies, and has contributed chapters to academic books published by Akashi Shoten (Tokyo) and Springer.

== See also ==
- Ethnic issues in Japan
- Naturalization
- Yamato people
