= Sexual abuse scandal in the Roman Catholic Diocese of Providence =

The sexual abuse scandal in the Roman Catholic Diocese of Providence is one of the most prominent episodes of sexual abuse by clerics in American history. The Diocese of Providence covers the State of Rhode Island.

Eleven clergy members who worked in the diocese have been convicted of sexual abuse crimes against minors, with sentences ranging from probation to three years in prison. The time period of the crimes ranged from the 1960s to the early 2000s. One priest who worked in the diocese was later convicted of sexual abuse crimes in two other countries. In 2002, the diocese agreed to a $13.5 million settlement for 36 individuals victimized by ten priests and one nun. However, many other sexual abuse lawsuits did not fall under this settlement.

Court documents revealed that the diocesan leadership reacted to early sexual abuse allegations by ignoring them or quietly transferring the offending cleric. Several of the lawsuits accused Bishop Louis Edward Gélineau and Auxiliary Bishop Kenneth A. Angell of these practices. The diocese acknowledged in 2021 that fifty of its diocesan priests, religious order priests and deacons had credible allegations of sexual abuse of minors.

== Actions by Diocese of Providence ==
The Diocese of Providence enacted a program in 1993 to educate its personnel on how to recognize and prevent child abuse. The mandate required all diocesan personnel and volunteers who came into contact with minors to participate in child abuse prevention and reporting training every three years.

In September 2002, Bishop Robert Mulvee announced a $13.5 million settlement for 36 sexual abuse lawsuits involving ten priests and one nun. He said,

"I hope that this action will be helpful to the victims of abuse and bring them in some way closer to closure and reconciliation with their God, their church, their families and themselves."

In October 2007, the diocese provided a court with a document listing 125 clerics accused of sexual abuse, with 95 accused of sexual abuse of minors. The diocese noted that this document contained all sexual abuse accusations, not just those that the diocese had deemed as credible.

In a 2018 interview with The Providence Journal, Bishop Emeritus Louis Gelineau denied any intention to ever cover up sexual abuse crimes while he was serving as bishop of Providence. The diocese in July 2021 published an updated list of 50 diocesan priests, religious order priests and deacons with credible accusations of sexual abuse of children over the previous 69 years. That same month, the diocese agreed to provide the Rhode Island Attorney General with all of its files relating to sexual abuse allegations.

== Ongoing sexual abuse prosecutions ==
As of 2025, the following clerics have been indicted in Rhode Island on sexual abuse charges and are awaiting trial.

=== Reverend Kevin R. Fisette ===
In August 2009, the diocese removed Fisette as pastor of St. Leo the Great Parish in Pawtucket. Rhode Island State Police had investigated an allegation by a man who said Fisette had sexually abused him in 1982. At that time, Fisette was serving as deacon in Our Lady of Victory Parish in Hopkinton and as a chaplain at Rhode Island Hospital in Providence. Prosecutors found the complainant's allegations to be credible, but could not prosecute Fisette due to the statute of limitations. Rhode Island Attorney General Peter Neronha announced in May 2022 that Fisette had been indicted on one count of first-degree sexual assault for the 1982 complaint.

=== Reverend John Petrocelli ===
Petrocelli was indicted in November 2020 on three counts of first-degree child molestation and nine counts of second-degree child molestation. He was accused of assaulting three males under age 14 when he was serving as a pastor at Holy Family Parish in Woonsocket between 1981 and 1990.

== Sexual abuse convictions ==
The following priests and deacon who served in the Diocese of Providence were convicted in an American court of sexual abuse crimes.

=== Reverend Joseph A. Abruzzese ===
In November 1993, a 16-year-old boy was walking in Roger Williams Park in Providence when Abruzzese propositioned him and groped his genitals. Abruzzese was then serving as assistant pastor of St. Anthony Parish in North Providence. The priest exposed himself to the victim, who broke free and escaped. Abruzzese was arraigned in January 1994 on second-degree sexual assault and disorderly conduct charges. In September 1994, he pleaded no contest to one count of second-degree sexual assault and was sentenced to five years of probation.

=== Reverend Daniel M. Azzarone, Jr. ===
Jeannette Costa complained in a 1993 letter to Gelineau that Azzarone had sexually abused her son Daniel Costa during the 1970s and 1980s. Daniel had told Jeanette about the abuse shortly before his death that year. Azzarone, then an assistant pastor at St. Clement Parish in Warwick, took Daniel on several trips, where he groped the boy. After hearing from Jeanette, a diocese lawyer told her that they would watch Azzarone. In 2002, the diocese said that they passed on Daniel's allegation in 1993 to the Rhode Island Department of Children and Families, but the agency refused to take action because Daniel was now an adult. The diocese kept Azzarone in ministry.

In November 2001, police arrested Azzarone, then assistant pastor at St. Mary Parish in Cranston, on multiple counts of first-degree sexual assault. The victim was a 16-year-old boy whom Azzarone sexually assaulting numerous times over the previous year at the St. Mary rectory. The family had known Azzarone for 12 years. A second victim from Cranston later joined the criminal case. After pleading no contest to two counts of first-degree sexual assault, Azzarone was sentenced in September 2005 to three years in state prison.

=== Reverend James D. Campbell ===
Campbell was indicted in Worcester, Massachusetts, in September 2003 on charges of unnatural rape, assault and battery and providing alcoholic beverages to a minor. A member of the Missionaries of the Sacred Heart, he had been assigned to St. Joseph's Parish in West Warwick. In 1975, Campbell took the 16-year-old male victim and a teenage girl to eat at a restaurant in Uxbridge, Massachusetts, then groped them in his car. In December 2003, Campbell pleaded guilty in Massachusetts to rape, two counts of assault and battery, two counts of furnishing alcohol to a minor, and unnatural and lascivious acts. He was sentenced to 90 days in jail in January 2005. The Vatican laicized him in February 2005.

=== Monsignor Louis Ward Dunn ===
In March 1994, Gelineau placed Dunn, pastor of St. Thomas Parish in Providence, on leave after receiving a sexual abuse allegation from a woman. A second woman, Phyllis M. Hutnak, sued the diocese in March 1995, saying at Dunn seduced her at age 17 into a sexual relationship while at St. Thomas. Another suit was filed by a woman against Dunn in December 1995. Dunn was charged in March 1996 with the sexual assaults of two women. The first victim was Lucille Suzanne Farr, who had been 14 years old in 1965 when Dunn, then pastor of Christ the King Parish in South Kingston, raped her. Dunn sexually assaulted Mary Ryan, the second victim, when she was a 21-year-old college student in 1982 attending the University of Rhode Island in Kingston.

Farr sued the diocese in May 1997 over her rape by Dunn. After she became pregnant by him, Dunn sent Farr to California to have the baby and put it up for adoption. In June 1997, a judge dismissed the Farr criminal case against Dunn because she did not resist him and he did not use force against her.

Also in July 1997, after a two-day trial, Dunn was convicted of sexually assaulting Ryan. However, in August 1997, after a public outcry of support for Dunn, the judge overturned the verdict and ordered a new trial for him. After Ryan appealed the ruling to the Rhode Island Supreme Court, the original verdict was reinstated. In December 1999, Dunn received a ten-year suspended sentence, with the judge ordering him to be confined at St. Antoine's Home, a skilled nursing facility in North Smithfield.

=== Reverend James W. Jackson ===
In 2021, a Rhode Island State Police investigation found that child pornography was being downloaded at a computer at St. Mary Parish in Providence. Jackson, a member of the Priestly Fraternity of St. Peter, was arrested in October 2021 on possession of child pornography. While awaiting trial for the next two years, Jackson stayed with his sister in Kansas. Investigators discovered that he was viewing child pornography while residing there. Jackson pleaded guilty in Rhode Island to child pornography charges in June 2023 and was sentenced to six years in prison in December 2023.

=== Reverend Michael V. LaMountain ===
The Archdiocese of Baltimore wrote about LaMountain to the leadership of the Diocese of Providence in 1993. It said that the Baltimore Police Department was investigating allegations that he had fondled some of his classmates when he was a seminarian at St. Mary's Seminary in Baltimore in the early 1970s. The diocese started its own investigation, but dropped it when the Baltimore police closed theirs.

In March 1995, a man told Gelineau that he had been sexually abused by LaMountain, then pastor at St. John the Baptist Parish in West Warwick. Gelineau immediately suspended LaMountain. That December, James Egan and Dan Turenne sued the diocese, saying that they had been sexually abused as boys by LaMountain while he was at St. John. He was indicted in November 1997 on two charges of first-degree sexual assault, six counts of second-degree sexual assault and one count of child molestation. The victims were five boys at St. John and at St. Kevin Parish in Warwick. Several of the victims from St. Kevin recalled LaMountain taking him to his cottage at Spring Lake, where he would skinny dip with the boys and fondle them.

LaMountain pleaded guilty in January 1999 to six counts of first-degree sexual assault, one count of second-degree sexual assault and one count of second-degree child molestation. He was sentenced to nine 12-year suspended sentences, to run concurrently. The Archdiocese of Baltimore listed LaMountain as a sexual abuser at St. Mary's Seminary in 2002.

=== Reverend Paul Henry Leech ===
The Rhode Island Department for Children and their Families asked the Rhode Island State Police in early 1984 to investigate sexual abuse allegations from three teenage boys. They were allegedly abused by Leech, an assistant pastor at St. Jude's Parish in Lincoln, between 1982 and 1984 in three parishes. In July 1984, Leech was charged with five counts of sexual assault. He pleaded no contest in August 1985 to three counts of second-degree sexual assault, two counts of third-degree sexual assault, two counts of sodomy and one count of assault and battery. Leech was sentenced in October 1985 to 86 years in prison, but the judge suspended 83 years of that sentence, giving Leech three years in prison.

=== Reverend William O'Connell ===
In 1983, two priests met with Angell about O'Connell, then a pastor at St. Mary's Parish in Bristol. They told Angell that they suspected O'Connell was molesting boys in the parish. According to their later account, the auxiliary bishop was dismissive of their concerns, telling them he wanted evidence. In February 1985, O'Connell was charged with sexually assaulting a 13-year-old boy and a 15-year-old boy at St. Mary. By the time he went on trial in 1986, the number of victims had increased to 12. O'Connell pleaded no contest to 26 sexual abuse counts; the judge sentenced him to five years in prison, with four years of the sentence suspended. He was also ordered to undergo two years of treatment at the Saint Luke Institute in Silver Spring, Maryland. After finishing his treatment and sentence, O'Connell left the priesthood and moved to New Jersey.

A man and his mother sued the diocese in 1990, stating that O'Connell had sexually abused him. The first sexual abuse lawsuit in diocesan history was settled for an unknown amount. O'Connell was arraigned in July 1994 in Lower Township, New Jersey, on multiple sexual abuse charges. Police searching his bungalow found thousands of pictures of young boys; many of the pictures were pornographic. He pleaded guilty in December 1995 and was sentenced to ten years in the Adult Diagnostic and Treatment Center, a correctional facility in Avenel, New Jersey.

=== Deacon Edward J. Sadowski, Jr. ===
In 2001, Sadowski, a deacon at St. Vincent de Paul Parish in Coventry was corresponding on social media with a 14-year-old girl. After sending her pornographic images and nude pictures of himself, he set up a date to meet the girl at a motel in Watertown, Massachusetts, to have sex and take nude pictures of her. When Sadowski arrived at the motel in July 2001, he was arrested by the Massachusetts State Police; the girl was actually a trooper. Sadowski was charged in Massachusetts with attempted statutory rape, attempted enticement of a minor to pose in a state of nudity, and the attempted dissemination of matter harmful to a minor.

Informed of the Massachusetts investigation in July, Rhode Island State Police searched Sadowski's residence and found some child pornography images. He was charged in Rhode Island with possession of child pornography in October 2001. Sadowski pleaded guilty in January 2002 in Boston to one count each of attempting to entice a minor to pose nude, to pose in a state of sexual conduct, and three counts of attempting to disseminate material harmful to minors. He was sentenced to two years in Massachusetts state prison. In December 2009 Sadowski, no longer allowed in ministry, was arrested in Coventry by state police after being indicted in Stafford County. Virginia in another child pornography sting operation.

=== Reverend James M. Silva ===
By 1994, Silva had been named in nine sexual abuse lawsuits by men whom he abused as children. His church personnel record showed a series of transfers, with him never staying more than two years in one parish. That same year, he was indicted on one count of second-degree sexual assault. His victim was Russell Cote, who had also filed a lawsuit against the diocese that year. Silva pleaded guilty in March 1995 to one count of second-degree sexual assault and received a seven-year suspended sentence with probation.

In November 2021, Silva was indicted by a state grand jury on two counts of first-degree child molestation and nine counts of second-degree child molestation. The victim was a 14-year-old boy whom Silva abused between 1989 and 1990.

== Other notable cases ==
=== Reverend Normand J. Demers ===
In 1986, as a priest at St. Joseph Parish in Providence, Demers founded The Haitian Project, which operated the Louverture Cleary School, a Catholic boarding school in Croix des Bouquets. By 1989, several boys had complained to Theresa Fox, a charity official, that Demers was touching them inappropriately. Haitian authorities investigated Demers and were ready to indict him. However, Angell of Providence persuaded Fox that if the Haitians let Demers return to the United States, the diocese would prosecute him. However, once Demers returned to Rhode Island in 1990, Gelineau assigned him as an assistant pastor at St. Martha Parish in East Providence.

The diocese suspended Demers in November 2002; he was then at St. Martha and had received an allegation of sexual abuse. The complainant said that Demers had sexually abused as a child in the late 1960s when Demers was a chaplain at Our Lady of Fatima Hospital in North Providence. The diocese was sued in February 2020 by Robert Houllahan, who said that Demers sexually assaulted him in the rectory of St. Joseph. Houllahan also said that Demers was involved in the sexual trafficking of boys from Central America to the United States.

=== Reverend Brendan Smyth ===
During the early 1960s, while visiting Holy Trinity Abbey in Kilnacrott, County Cavan, in Ireland, Bishop Russell McVinney asked the Norbertine abbot, Kevin A. Smith, if any of his priests would be interested in working in Rhode Island. In 1965, Smyth accepted an assignment at Our Lady of Mercy Parish in East Greenwich. Smith admitted in 1994 that he failed to tell McVinney that Smyth had sexually abused children in Ireland. The diocese soon received complaints about Smyth abusing children in Rhode Island and in 1968 sent him back to Ireland; the Norbertines then admitted Smyth to Purdysburn Hospital in Belfast, Northern Ireland, for treatment of pedophilia. Smyth returned to the Diocese of Providence in 1969 for a brief visit.

In June 1994, Smyth pleaded guilty in Belfast to eight charges of child abuse in Northern Ireland and was sentenced to four years in prison. He was convicted of more sexual abuse charges in September 1995. In March 1997, after finishing his sentence in Northern Ireland, Smyth was extradited to the Republic of Ireland to face more charges there. In July 1997, he pleaded guilty to 74 counts of child sexual abuse and was sentenced to 12 years in prison. Smyth died a month later.

Jeff Thomas sued the diocese and the Norbertines in June 2008, stating that Smyth had molested and sodomized him as a child in 1967 or 1968 at Our Lady of Mercy.

== See also ==
- Charter for the Protection of Children and Young People
- Essential Norms
- Holy Water-Gate: Abuse Cover-up in the Catholic Church, a 2004 documentary that focuses on the abuse that took place in Rhode Island during the 1980s and '90s
- National Review Board
- Pontifical Commission for the Protection of Minors
