= Anís Zunúzí Baháʼí School =

School in Haiti

Coordinates: 18°37′03″N 72°14′56″W

The Anís Zunúzí Baháʼí School is a Baháʼí school near Port-au-Prince, Haiti, which began in 1980. It reached the point of offering classes K through 10th grade. The building survived the 2010 Haiti earthquake and was the site of a clinic during the relief effort.

== General information ==
The Anís Zunúzí Baháʼí School (Ecole Baháʼíe Anís Zunúzí), named for the companion who suffered execution with the Báb, began classes in 1980 and grew into a K-9 primary and secondary school, serving 232 students by 1983, 270 by 1988. For a time the secondary school program was closed to focus on K-4th primary school offerings. The secondary program re-opened in September 2004 and has added one class per year since then and by 2009 the school was a K-10 school (intending on becoming a full high school and offering national exams.) Its initial funding and operating budget for years came from a Belgian Baháʼí family. The student population comes mostly from no- to low-income families, and most students are only paying minimal or no fees to attend the school. It follows the national curriculum but also provides moral education and English classes. It is situated on about three acres of land in what has become a suburb several miles north east of Port-au-Prince proper (and a few miles north west of Croix-des-Bouquets.)

When the school was established, the area was rural and underdeveloped. A 220 V power line was brought in from Bon Repos to provide the school with electricity, and the first telephone line reached the school only in 1989. An artesian well was drilled and provided drinking water to the school as well as to the public through a pipe ending at a fountain at the Bon Repos-Beudet road. In October 1982 Rúhíyyih Khanum, a Hand of the Cause, a position of prominence in the Baháʼí Faith, presided at the official inauguration ceremony for the school. The initial board of directors were Counsellor Farzam Arbab, Dr. Nabil Hanna, Benjamin Levy, Dr. Iraj Majzub and Georges Marcellus. The first school principal came from Germany in 1980 (Hans J Thimm, later of Union School, Haiti.). Current directors are Sue and Yves Puzo.

The area has been built up with private homes and businesses and the school has been broken into twice forcing security infrastructure additions. The arable land in the vicinity of the school is no longer being worked due to lack of water and lack of initiative on the part of the youth who prefer to find other means of employment that are easier or more lucrative. The Mona Foundation has supported the school with funding for support of satellite schools, scholarships, regular summer camps, and general funding as well as acting as a mediator of larger scale funding for infrastructure improvements.

== Program ==
The program at the school involves:

- In September 2003 the school opened an afternoon program for children who were too old, too poor, or too busy to attend the morning sessions.
- There are classes on moral education, English, folk dancing, sewing, computer classes, and crafts and an annual school outing.
- Materials used start in Kindergarten through 4th grade were prepared in Columbia that concentrate on building spiritual qualities. In grades 3 and 4 they follow lessons from the Virtues Guide in French. In grades 5 to 9 they follow the pre-youth courses: “Breezes of Confirmation”, “Glimmerings of Hope”, and “Walking the Straight Path”.
- Teacher training has been a part of the school's schedule for the past 15 years. However, with the turnover in staff there are no teachers that have been here longer than five, and most only one or two, years. This requires a constant assessment of needs and further instruction to fill the gaps.
- The school has charged $10 per month per child, although for many even this amount is not affordable.
- The main school is responsible for two satellite schools in Guerot and Pont Benoit, each serving around 50 students: the New Horizon School, which is run by Bernard Martinod, a French architect and the Georges Marcellus School in the rural village of Gureot.

== Development projects ==
The school has acted as a base of a number of development projects:

- In 1984 the school began publication of a quarterly newspaper, "Timun" (which in Haitian Creole means children or, more literally, "little people") and subtitled "Development of Baha'i Education in Haiti."
- With the help of CARE, a food program was started. The first grade teacher noticed a great difference in his 6-8 year olds. Before, many children in the area only ate once a day (in the afternoon or evening), and were tired during the mornings. The poorer families with many children and little income even skipped a day or two. In this situation, the lunch provided by the school helped increase the students' receptivity.
- When the school started in 1980, the average age of students starting school was 10 years. When the school became the springboard for six pre-school centers managed by the school's Development Project in several neighboring villages, parents were even more encouraged to send their children to school at an earlier age. After about five years, the situation had normalized, and students entering first grade were now mostly 6-7 year olds.
- From 1983 to 1984 funding from the Canadian International Development Agency (CIDA) and the Universal House of Justice was spent on a development project run through the school. 20 volunteers from the school were trained in various subjects. Initially a survey encompassing 98 households and 216 individuals in Lilavois, Depio, Savanne Blonde, Ségur and Cesleste was undertaken. Mini-cooperatives and women's committees met discussing possible initiatives. In Lilavois and Liancourt they were interested in crafts, cooking, sewing and, to some extent, literacy and upgrading of those skills. In the Artibonite valley they created 17 mini-cooperatives composed of friends who invest in commercial or agricultural projects with their own money in a microfinance arrangement. "Animation" techniques and quotes from Baháʼí literature were compiled. Demonstration gardens were set up. The Local Spiritual Assembly of Liancourt carried development after the project in their area independently from the initial work through the school. Four village early childhood education centers were built, with teachers being partially supported by the parents in those villages. Projects continued to advance in 1986.
- A technical-vocational program developed through the school in 1985 established a small iron and wood workshop in a modest building. With funding from the Canadian International Development Agency (CIDA), tools were procured, and the first seven apprentices were trained. The workshop produced furniture, seedling racks, a sand sifter, bee-keeping hives and frames, and decorative and protective ironwork for windows and gates. However this program ceased around 2002 when the schools program focused on primary grades.
- After receiving seed funding from the Pan American Development Foundation in 1985-6, the school initiated a grafter tree project producing 80,000 seedlings a year. This was extended and accelerated in 1987. And teacher orientation and training to further integrate school based development projects and schooling and the Spiritual Assembly of Lilavois supervised projects in its area.
- In May 1986 filming for a documentary on the school was begun and it evolved into a 20-minute documentary video From Haitian Roots about education and development projects accomplished by the school.
- During the first years, a primer (Bondye Bon) and a second-year reader (Bo lakay nou) were developed in Creole to help children read and write in their native language. In 1987 the school developed a third-grade French-language reader, Ouvrons la Porte, to help in the transition from Haitian Creole to French by introducing one French sound at a time while otherwise using already known Creole letters and words. While methods employed by most other schools enabled students to read (but not understand) French mainly by rote memorizing, the three books (developed by Matty Bellows Thimm, the second school principal) made students functional in literacy. All books use pictures and stories containing Baháʼí principles, although they do not refer specifically to the religion.

== Recent situation ==
The school has a Facebook presence. In September 2009 there was filming for a documentary about Mona Foundation projects including the Anís Zunúzí school.

The principal of the Anís Zunúzí School reported on January 17, 2010 that the school buildings were generally still standing after the 2010 Haiti earthquake and its staff were cooperating in relief efforts and sharing space and support with neighbors. A clinic was run at the school by a medical team from the United States and Canada. The group has since organized under the name Love for Haiti; it had organized spontaneously, largely through Facebook. The group gave a presentation on their Haiti experience at St. Matthews Parish Hall in Hoboken, NJ on Feb. 18, and returned to Haiti in March. The group included one photo journalist.

== See also ==
- Baháʼí Faith in Haiti
- Education in Haiti
- List of schools in Haiti
- Humanitarian response by non-governmental organizations to the 2010 Haiti earthquake
