= Mona Mahmudnizhad =

Iranian Baháʼí executed for her religion in 1983

- مونا محمود نژاد
- Born: September 10, 1965; Aden, Federation of South Arabia
- Died: June 18, 1983 (aged 17); Shiraz, Iran
- Cause of death: Execution by hanging
- Known for: Execution for membership in the Baháʼí Faith

Mona Mahmudnizhad (Persian: مونا محمود نژاد, September 10, 1965 – June 18, 1983) was an Iranian Baháʼí who, in 1983, together with nine other Baháʼí women, was sentenced to death and hanged in Shiraz, Iran, on the grounds of being a member of the Baháʼí Faith. The official charges ranged from "misleading children and youth" to being a "Zionist", as the Baháʼí World Centre is located in Israel.

The nonprofit Mona Foundation focusing on girls' education was named after her in 2001.

== Childhood ==
Mahmudnizhad was born on September 10, 1965, to Yad'u'llah and Farkhundeh Mahmudnizhad, who had left their home in Iran to teach the religion in southwestern Yemen (at the time part of the Federation of South Arabia).

In 1969, the government of South Yemen expelled all foreigners and the Mahmudnizhad family returned to Iran. They spent two years in Isfahan, six months in Kermanshah, and three years in Tabriz before finally settling in Shiraz in 1974. During this time, her father worked repairing small appliances and served the Baháʼí community in various Baháʼí administrative bodies.

== Arrest, sentencing and death ==
While persecution of Baháʼís regularly occurs in Iran, the persecution increased following the Islamic Revolution of 1979. At 7:30pm on October 23, 1982, four armed Revolutionary Guards, on the orders of the public prosecutor of Shiraz, entered the Mahmudnizhad household and ransacked it, in search of Baháʼí material. The guards then took Mona and her father into custody. They were blindfolded and taken to Seppah prison in Shiraz, where they were placed in separate quarters, and Mahmudnizhad was detained there for 38 days. On November 29, 1982, she and five other Baháʼí women were transferred from Seppah prison to Adel Abad Prison, also in Shiraz.

After some time, she was taken to the Islamic Revolutionary Court where she was interrogated and then returned to prison. A few days later, she was again interrogated in front of an Islamic Revolutionary judge. After these interrogations, which involved physical torture by being whipped on the soles of her feet with a cable, Mahmudnizhad was found guilty on manufactured charges and sentenced to death by hanging.

President of the United States Ronald Reagan called for clemency; despite this, the sentence of the 10 women was carried out on the night of June 18, 1983, at a nearby polo field.

The other women who were hanged with Mahmudnizhad were:

- Nusrat Yalda'i, 54 years old.
- 'Izzat Janami Ishraqi, 50 years old.
- Roya Ishraqi, 23 and daughter of 'Izzat.
- Tahereh Arjomandi Siyavashi, 30 years old.
- Zarrin Muqimi, 28 years old.
- Shirin Dalvand, 25 years old.
- Akhtar Sabet, 25 years old.
- Simin Saberi, 24 years old.
- Mahshid Nirumand, 28 years old.

In September 2007, the Iran Human Rights Documentation Center published a case study on the subject.

== Depictions ==
Mahmudnizhad's story is the subject of several art works. Music artist Doug Cameron recreated Mahmudnizhad's story in a music video, Mona with the Children, which made the pop charts in Canada (#14 for the week of October 19, 1985). The video was distributed throughout the music scene and was effective in bringing the persecution of Baháʼís in Iran to international public attention.

A play based on Mahmudnizhad's story titled A Dress for Mona has been produced and in 2008 Jack Lenz planned to produce a film called Mona's Dream, which won an award in 2010. Her pictures are also featured in Mithaq Kazimi's Quenching The Light video.

== See also ==
- Persecution of Baháʼís
- Human rights in Iran
- Táhirih
