= Baháʼí Faith in Haiti =

The Baháʼí Faith in Haiti began in 1916 when ʻAbdu'l-Bahá, the head of the religion, cited Haiti as one of the island countries of the Caribbean where Baháʼís should establish a religious community. The first Baháʼí to visit the island was Mrs. Harriet Gibbs Marshall, from 1922 to 1928. Another early Baháʼí to visit Haiti was Leonora Armstrong in 1927. After that, others visited Haiti, and by January 1937 Louis George Gregory visited the island and cited the presence of a small community of Baháʼís. The first long term pioneers, Ruth and Ellsworth Blackwell, arrived in 1940. Following their arrival the first Baháʼí Local Spiritual Assembly of Haiti was formed in 1942 in Port-au-Prince. From 1951 the Haitian Baháʼís participated in regional organizations of the religion until 1961 when Haitian Baháʼís elected their own National Spiritual Assembly and soon took on goals reaching out into neighboring islands. The Association of Religion Data Archives (relying mostly on the World Christian Encyclopedia) estimated some 23,000 Baháʼís in Haiti in 2005, and about the same in 2010.

== Early phase ==
ʻAbdu'l-Bahá, the son of the founder of the religion, wrote a series of letters, or tablets, to the followers of the religion in the United States in 1916–1917; these letters were compiled together in a book titled Tablets of the Divine Plan. The sixth of the tablets was the first to mention Latin American regions and was written on April 8, 1916, but was delayed in being presented in the United States until 1919—after the end of the First World War and the 1918 Spanish flu pandemic. The sixth tablet was translated and presented by Mirza Ahmad Sohrab on April 4, 1919, and published in Star of the West magazine on December 12, 1919.

His Christ Holiness says: Travel ye to the East and to the West of the world and summon the people to the Kingdom of God....(travel to) the Islands of the West Indies, such as Cuba, Haiti, Puerto Rico, Jamaica, the Islands of the Lesser Antilles, Bahama Islands, even the small Watling Island, have great importance...

In 1922 Harriet Gibbs Marshall accompanied her husband to Haiti, where he was sent by President Warren G. Harding to be a part of the U.S. legation. They lived there for six years, during which time she founded the Jean Joseph Industrial School in Port-au-Prince and worked extensively with Haitian social welfare charities. She had been a Baha'i since 1912 and is famous for having provided the venue for the first integrated Baha'i Feast in the Southern United States at her 902 T Street Music School. She also opened schools serving those of African Descent in Kentucky in 1900 and DC in 1902.

Five years later, Leonora Armstrong visited Haiti in 1927 as part of her plan to complement and complete Martha Root's unfulfilled intention of visiting all the Latin American countries for the purpose of presenting the religion to an audience. In 1929 Keith Ransom-Kehler visited Haiti.

=== Seven Year Plan and succeeding decades ===
Shoghi Effendi, head of the religion after the death of ʻAbdu'l-Bahá, wrote a cable on May 1, 1936, to the Baháʼí Annual Convention of the United States and Canada, and asked for the systematic implementation of ʻAbdu'l-Bahá's vision to begin. In his cable he wrote:

Appeal to assembled delegates ponder historic appeal voiced by ʻAbdu'l-Bahá in Tablets of the Divine Plan. Urge earnest deliberation with incoming National Assembly to insure its complete fulfillment. First century of Baháʼí Era drawing to a close. Humanity entering outer fringes most perilous stage its existence. Opportunities of present hour unimaginably precious. Would to God every State within American Republic and every Republic in American continent might ere termination of this glorious century embrace the light of the Faith of Baháʼu'lláh and establish structural basis of His World Order.

Following the May 1 cable, another cable from Shoghi Effendi came on May 19 calling for permanent pioneers to be established in all the countries of Latin America. The Baháʼí National Spiritual Assembly of the United States and Canada appointed the Inter-America Committee to take charge of the preparations. During the 1937 Baháʼí North American Convention, Shoghi Effendi cabled advising the convention to prolong their deliberations to permit the delegates and the National Assembly to consult on a plan that would enable Baháʼís to go to Latin America as well as to include the completion of the outer structure of the Baháʼí House of Worship in Wilmette, Illinois. In 1937 the First Seven Year Plan (1937–44), which was an international plan designed by Shoghi Effendi, gave the American Baháʼís the goal of establishing the Baháʼí Faith in every country in Latin America.

=== Establishment ===
Just before this plan was announced, the next Baháʼís to visit were Louis George Gregory and his wife, who could speak French, in January 1937. While there they had a chance to meet Oswald Garrison Villard. Gregory indicated a community of at least five active members who had French translations of Some Answered Questions, and that the community was refused permission to hold public meetings. Several Baháʼís then made stops of varying lengths in Haiti.

Ruth and Ellsworth Blackwell are noted as pioneers starting around 1940. By 1941 three converts to the religion include Mr. and Mrs. McBean and Muriel Johnson, a Jamaican couple and niece. The first Local Spiritual Assembly of Haiti was formed in 1942 in Port-au-Prince. Further translations, including the Will and Testament of ʻAbdu'l-Bahá, arrived later in 1942. The Blackwells left by July 1943 though the community continued functioning. Word is received of two converts, Royer Dejean and Andre Paul, by January 1944. In 1943 writer and Baháʼí Alain Locke was on leave as Inter-American exchange Professor to Haiti under the joint auspices of the American Committee for Inter-American Artistic and Intellectual Relations and the Haitian Ministry of Education. Towards the end of his stay there, President Élie Lescot personally decorated Locke with the National Order of Honour and Merit, grade of Commandeur. In March 1946 Dr. Malcolm King moved to Haiti. By August there were some 20 Baháʼís in Port-au-Prince and the assembly was able to register with the national government. King moved away in 1947 while other pioneers move to Haiti. In early 1948 a Latin American Congress was called in Mexico to coordinate institutional growth across the region and the delegate from Haiti was Martial Coulange. In late 1948 Gayle Woolson and early 1949 Louise Caswell each were able to travel through Haiti communities like Saint Marc and elsewhere and gave public talks.

By 1949 Baháʼís of Port-au-Prince had a working center which served to have children and adult oriented events including classes, free medical, dental, and legal services as well as chances to hear about the religion. The Blackwell's returned to Haiti in 1950.

== Growth ==
=== Internationally ===
From the early period of development the Baháʼí community in Haiti grew in relation to its regional neighbors as well as internally. The Baháʼís of the region of northern Latin America were first organized under the regional national assembly of Central America, Mexico and the Antilles from 1951. The inaugural convention was witnessed by Hand of the Cause Dorothy Beecher Baker at which the Baháʼís of Haiti were assigned two delegates from its local assembly of Port-au-Prince. Then Haitian Baháʼís were assigned to the regional assembly of the Greater Antilles from 1957 until 1961, when the Haitian Baháʼís elected their own National Spiritual Assembly with Hand of the Cause Ugo Giachery representing the Baháʼí International Community. The members of the first National Spiritual Assembly of Haiti were: Eustace Bailey, Alcide Narcisse, Jean Desert, Joseph Albert Bajeux, Ellsworth Blackwell, André St. Louis, Joseph C. Pierre, Ruth Blackwell, and Circé Brantome. In 1963 the Baháʼís of the world looked to the election of the Universal House of Justice as the new head of the religion. The delegates for the international convention were the members of the national assemblies then in existence. The members of the Haitian National Assembly who participated in the election were: Eustace Bailey, Odette Benjamin, Ellsworth Blackwell, Ruth Blackwell, Circe Brantome, Jean Desert, Alcide Narcisse, Speline Posy, André St. Louis (all of whom voted in absentia). In 1964 Haitian Baháʼís were then given goal areas to spread the religion including Barbuda, St. Kitts-Nevis, Saba, St. Eustatis, St. Martin, Guadeloupe, Antigua and Martinique. In 1965 Guadeloupe and Martinique had families from Haiti pioneer there while members of the national assembly attended a Honduran conference on the progress of the religion there. Over the next few years pioneers from Haiti went to Bangui, the capital of the Central African Republic, and Dahomey (now called Benin) followed by Dominica in 1971 – Hand of the Cause, ʻAlí-Muhammad Varqá, offered a conference workshop on pioneering at the Amelia Collins Baháʼí School at Liancourt later in 1971.

=== Internally ===
Internally in 1953 Guillermo Aguilar, former chairman of the Lima, Peru local assembly, directed the establishment of a technological school for Haiti on behalf of the United Nations and took several opportunities for talks on the religion and the United Nations. In 1955 the regional assembly began publishing a National Bulletin which would be published in English, Spanish and French. 1956 was a year of several developments in Haiti. The first local assembly of Cap-Haïtien was elected in April and traveling Baháʼís visited communities across Haiti. The national center was acquired in February and dedicated in May. 1956 also marked the first national conference on the progress of the religion – members of four cities of Haiti were represented. By 1957 the Blackwells had again returned to Haiti for a shorter stay. In 1958 a United Nations Day celebration was set by the Baháʼís at which some 70 non-Baháʼís attended and Baháʼí marriage ceremonies were accepted legally. In 1958 Haiti hosted the convention to elect the regional assembly of the Greater Antilles as well as the first international school of the Antilles with attendees from Cuba, the Dominican Republic, Jamaica, and Haiti. Hand of the Cause Ugo Giachery and then US National Assembly member Glenford Mitchell met with the Antilles assembly as well as giving talks in February 1959 in Haiti. Two conferences on the progress of the religion as well as international schools were again held in Haiti and another set in the Dominican republic were held in 1960 – the Haitian school having Giachery, Mitchell and others giving talks. Public talks on the religion were held in Port-au-Prince and Liancourt. The Blackwells again returned to Haiti November 1960. An organized campaign in 1962 used techniques learned in Africa (see Baháʼí Faith in Uganda for example) establishing communities of dozens of Baháʼís. In 1963 there were Baháʼí Local Spiritual Assemblies in 10 towns including Cap-Haïtien, Port-au-Prince, and Saint-Marc – a registered group of Baháʼís in Pétion-Ville and isolated Baháʼís in 5 other locations. The 1964 national convention had 19 delegates from across Haiti representing thirteen local assemblies. In 1969 Ellswoorth Blackwell was able to present a talk to the Toastmasters International club on the subject of "Equality of the Sexes." In December 1976 a traveling Baháʼí from France, Andre Brugiroux, visited Haiti for a weeklong tour and was able to show a film of his at the Haitian French Institute on two occasions for an audience ultimately of some 670 people. In 1977 secretaries and treasurers of more than half the local assemblies of Haiti were gathered for a one-day institute conducted in the Creole language by native believers about assembly functions. The 1979 national convention had 49 delegates present to elect the national assembly. In 1989 the leadership of the Haitian Cayemites island's population made a decision to adopt the religion for the island and a school was established in 1989.

=== Socio-economic development projects ===
Since its inception the religion has had involvement in socio-economic development beginning by giving greater freedom to women, promulgating the promotion of female education as a priority concern, and that involvement was given practical expression by creating schools, agricultural coops, and clinics. In 1978-9 articles relating to International Year of the Child were placed by Baháʼís in national and local newspapers and three radio stations in Haiti carried announcements of public meetings. The religion entered a new phase of activity when a message of the Universal House of Justice dated 20 October 1983 was released. In December 1983 the national assembly registered with the government as an NGO. Baháʼís were urged to seek out ways, compatible with the Baháʼí teachings, in which they could become involved in the social and economic development of the communities in which they lived. World-wide in 1979 there were 129 officially recognized Baháʼí socio-economic development projects. By 1987, the number of officially recognized development projects had increased to 1482. In 1980, the Haitian Baháʼí community started an elementary school (Anís Zunúzí), later joined by a forest protection program, and a variety of village kindergartens.

==== Anís Zunúzí Baháʼí School ====
The Anís Zunúzí Baháʼí School is a Baháʼí School near Port-au-Prince which first began to hold classes in 1980. In October 1982 Rúhíyyih Khanum, a Hand of the Cause, a position of prominence in the Baháʼí Faith, presided at the official inauguration ceremony for the school. The initial board of directors were Counsellor Farzam Arbab, Dr. Nabil Hanna, Benjamin Levy, Dr. Iraj Majzub and Georges Marcellus. It reached the point of offering classes K through 10th grade. The student population comes mostly from no to low-income families, and most students are only paying minimal or no fees to attend the school. It follows the national curriculum but also provides moral education and English classes. It is situated on about three acres of land in what has become a suburb several miles north east of Port-au-Prince proper (and a few north west of Croix-des-Bouquets).

More recently the whole area has been built up with both private homes and businesses. More recently the Mona Foundation has supported the school with funding for support of satellite schools, scholarships, regular summer camps, and general funding as well as acting as a mediator of larger scale funding for infrastructure improvements.

==== CAFT (Centre d'apprentissage et de Formation pour la Transformation) Program ====
Another Baháʼí development program in Haiti, CAFT (Centre d'apprentissage et de Formation pour la Transformation) Program, is also supported by the Mona Foundation, which offers teacher-training programs in cooperation with other NGOs helping schools across Haiti and is registered with the Haitian Ministry of Social Affairs and is authorized to function as a training agency by the Ministry of Education. Its projects began in 2000 with Plan International, then YELE Haiti 2005–06, UNICEF 2006, 2007 and currently is managing the training component of the Rewriting the Future project of Save the Children (2008–2010).

== Modern community ==
A decade of collaboration was developed between a village and a network of people in the United States through Baháʼí contacts. Others had made trips recently as part of a documentary on Baháʼí efforts in Haiti. Two of the schools recently added include New Horizon School, which is run by Bernard Martinod, a French architect, outside Port-au-Prince that serves some of the small villages in the area, and the Georges Marcellus School in the rural village of Gureot. The government of Haiti voted in favor of a United Nations General Assembly Resolution on the "Situation of Human Rights in the Islamic Republic of Iran" (UN document no. A/C.3/56/L.50) on 19 December 2001. See Persecution of Baháʼís. Various Baháʼís continue to explore Haiti as a place to offer services. In 2007, following the United Nations' adoption of the "Draft Guiding Principles on Extreme poverty and Human Rights", the Baháʼí International Community organized local consultations with Baháʼí communities in Haiti and several other countries around the world in order to draw out their perspectives on the meaning and experience of poverty, and its connection to human rights in order to provide its comment on the Draft Guiding Principles and submitted to the Office of the High Commissioner for Human Rights.

=== After the 2010 Haiti earthquake ===
The United States National Spiritual Assembly directed prayers to be offered at the Baháʼí House of Worship, posted messages about individuals, and commented on the spiritual import of such events from the Baháʼí writings:

... When such a crisis sweeps over the world no person should hope to remain intact. We belong to an organic unit and when one part of the organism suffers all the rest of the body will feel its consequence. This is in fact the reason why Baha'u'llah calls our attention to the unity of mankind. But as Baháʼís we should not let such hardship weaken our hope in the future...

Prayers and raising donations were also offered at the Green Acre Baháʼí School. News of the Baháʼís as of January 16 reported that the community was generally accounted for with no deaths.

The principal of Anis Zununi school in 2010 reported on January 17 on Facebook that the school was generally still standing and its staff and others with CAFT were cooperating in relief efforts and sharing space and support with neighbors. A clinic was run at the Zunuzi school by a medical team from the United States and Canada.

=== Demographics ===
The Association of Religion Data Archives (relying on World Christian Encyclopedia) estimated some 23,055 Baháʼís in 2005, and about the same in 2010. The Institut Haïtien de Statistique et d'Informatique does not offer breakdowns of religions for 5% of the Haitian population, and the only non-Christian group mentioned are the Haitian Vodou (aka Vodouisant).

== See also ==
- Religion in Haiti
- History of Haiti
- Anís Zunúzí Baháʼí School
