= John S. Bonnici =

American Catholic prelate (born 1965)

His Excellency, The Most Reverend John S. Bonnici
- Bishop of Rochester
- Diocese: Rochester
- Appointed: January 7, 2026
- Installed: March 19, 2026
- Predecessor: Salvatore Ronald Matano
- Previous post: Auxiliary Bishop of New York & Titular Bishop of Arindela (2022-2026)

Orders
- Ordination: June 22, 1991 by John O'Connor
- Consecration: March 1, 2022 by Timothy M. Dolan, John Joseph O'Hara, Gerald Thomas Walsh

Personal details
- Born: February 17, 1965 (age 61) New York City, New York, US
- Education: St. John's University; Pontifical Gregorian University; John Paul II Pontifical Theological Institute for Marriage and Family Sciences (S.T.L.); John Paul II Institute (S.T.D.)
- Motto: To Jesus through Mary
- Styles
- Reference style: His Excellency; The Most Reverend
- Spoken style: Your Excellency
- Religious style: Bishop

John Samuel Bonnici (born February 17, 1965) is an American Catholic prelate who serves as bishop of the Diocese of Rochester in New York State. He previously served as an auxiliary bishop for the Archdiocese of New York in New York City.

== Biography ==
=== Early life ===
Bonnici was born on February 17, 1965, in New York City to John C. Bonnici and Gertrude (née Rilling) Bonnici. He has one sister.

Bonnici attended the Cathedral Preparatory School and Seminary in Manhattan, New York and graduated in 1983. He earned a bachelor's degree in biology and philosophy at St. John's University in Brooklyn, New York, in 1987.

Bonnici traveled to Rome in 1987 to attend the seminary of the Pontifical North American College and study at the Pontifical Gregorian University. He pursued his graduate studies at the Pontifical John Paul II Institute in Rome where he earned his Licentiate of Sacred Theology degree (1990-1992). At the Washington, D.C. campus of the same Pontifical John Paul II Institute, he earned his Doctor of Sacred Theology degree in 1995.

=== Priesthood ===
Bonnici was ordained a priest at St. Patrick's Cathedral in Manhattan on June 22, 1991, by Cardinal John O'Connor for the Archdiocese of New York. After his ordination, Bonnici was assigned to the faculty of St Joseph's Seminary in Yonkers, New York. Over the course of 20 years he served as an adjunct professor of moral theology at St. Joseph's. In 1992 he moved to Our Lady of Mount Carmel Parish in Elmsford, New York, to serve as its parochial vicar. In 1995, Bonnici became assistant director of the Archdiocesan Family Life/Respect Life Office. He became director the following year.

New York Governor George Pataki appointed Bonnici to a seven-year term on the board of trustees of the City University of New York in April 2002.

In 2002, Bonnici became the pastor of St. Philip Neri Parish in the Bronx. In 2008, he was assigned as pastor at St. Columba Parish in Chester, New York, serving there for the next 13 years. He also served as parochial administrator at St. Mary's Parish in Washingtonville, New York, from 2020 to 2021. In 2021 he was named pastor of St. Augustine Parish and Sts. John and Paul Parish in Larchmont, New York.

=== Auxiliary Bishop of New York ===
Coat of Arms as Auxiliary Bishop of New York

On January 25, 2022, Pope Francis appointed Bonnici as an auxiliary bishop of New York. Bonnici was consecrated as a bishop at St. Patrick's Cathedral by Cardinal Timothy M. Dolan on March 1, 2022, with Auxiliary Bishops John O'Hara and Gerald Walsh serving as co-consecrators. After his episcopal consecration, he continued to serve as pastor of St. Augustine Parish and Sts. John and Paul Parish in Larchmont. In his role as auxiliary bishop, he also serves as the episcopal vicar for Westchester and Rockland Counties.

In May 2022, Bonnici accompanied Dolan on a visit to Poland and Slovakia to call attention to the plight of Ukrainian refugees from the February 2022 Russian invasion of Ukraine.

=== Bishop of Rochester ===
On January 7, 2026, Pope Leo XIV accepted the retirement of Bishop Salvatore Ronald Matano and appointed Bonnici as the 10th bishop of Rochester. He was installed on March 19, 2026. Currently, the Rev. Aaron J. Kelly serves as his secretary.

=== Boards and Committees ===
Bonnici is a member of the United States Conference of Catholic Bishops' Committee on the Protection of Children and Young People and the Subcommittee on the Catechism. He also serves on the Pontifical North American College's Board of Governors since 2023.

Bonnici serves as a member of the board of Aid to the Church in Need (ACN United States), which provides pastoral and humanitarian assistance to the persecuted Church around the world. He also serves as a member of the board of The Christopher Missions Foundation which primarily assists the Diocese of Miao in establishing village churches, building parish schools, providing clean drinking water wells, ministry to at risk women, and economic sustainability projects.

=== Publications ===
- Person to Person: Friendship and Love in the Life and Theology of Hans Urs Von Balthasar (1999)
- Partners in Life and Love: A Preparation Handbook for the Celebration of Catholic Marriage (co-authored with Monsignor Joseph Giandurco)

== See also ==
- Catholic Church hierarchy
- Catholic Church in the United States
- Historical list of the Catholic bishops of the United States
- List of Catholic bishops of the United States
- Lists of patriarchs, archbishops, and bishops

Catholic Church titles
Preceded by Salvatore Ronald Matano	Bishop of Rochester; 2026-present	Succeeded by Incumbent
Preceded by -	Auxiliary Bishop of New York; 2022-2026	Succeeded by -
