= Holy Water-Gate =

2004 documentary

Holy Water-Gate: Abuse Cover-up in the Catholic Church is a 2004 documentary which investigates the crisis that emerged within the Catholic Church in the United States, as victims of child sex abuse by priests fight to bring their abusers to justice.

== Plot ==
The film functions as a personal journey of filmmaker Mary Healey, who is also Catholic. Through key players in the scandal, including victims, whistle-blower priests and a senior ranking U.S. cardinal who is called upon by the Vatican to control an ever-growing storm, Holy Water-Gate describes the institutional mind of the U.S. Catholic Church, which not only failed the victims for many years by not acknowledging their abuse, but also enabled some priests to continue to abuse more children by relocating them in other parishes. The film investigates the crisis and highlights the reluctance within the U.S. mainstream media for decades to report on sexual abuse crimes against children by priests.

== Movie details ==
- Title: Holy Water-Gate: Abuse Cover-Up in the Catholic Church
- Running Time: 56 Minutes
- Country: Australia, Canada, Italy
- Genre: Biography, Law & Crime, Social History

== List of broadcasts ==
- Austria, ORF September 7, 2011 (German language version).
- The Documentary Channel, USA 2010, 2011.
- Austria ORF, February 23, 2010 (German language version).
- SBS Australia 2004 - 2006,
- TVE Spain 2005 (Spanish language version),
- DR Denmark 2005 (Subtitled),
- RTSI Switzerland 2005 (Italian language version),
- CBC Canada 2004 - 2006,
- ShowTime, USA 2005.

== Screenings ==
- Rhode Island International Film Festival, August 2005.
- Abuse Survivors Network Conference, Chicago, IL, June 2005.
- Cine Awards, Washington, DC, June 2005.
- Cable Car Cinema Providence, RI, April 2005.
- Coolidge Corner Theatre, Brookline, MA January, 2005.
- University of Rhode Island, November 2004.

== Reviews and awards ==
"Director/writer/producer Mary Healey and co-producer Louise Rosen use the abuse that took place in Rhode Island during the 1980s and '90s as a springboard to investigating the Catholic Church's penchant for covering up accusations of sexual abuse by members of the clergy. A pastor in Cranston, Father James Silva abused children for years before his crimes were brought to the attention of the Diocese of Providence. Transferred to 12 different parishes over the course of the next 16 years, Father Silva's patterns of abuse continued unabated, the parents at each new parish never realizing that their churchgoing children were in the care of a genuine sexual predator. In another shocking case, a priest reported to police by his two victims was assigned a scant six months of therapy and assigned to a new parish after the official report mysteriously vanished and no official charges were made. In many cases, when victims' advocates, other priests, or reporters attempted to reveal similar cases to the public, they were repeatedly blocked and/or harassed by church officials and—in some cases—the perpetrators themselves. Why is the Catholic Church willing to work so hard to keep these cases from the public, especially when they seem well aware that by doing so they're putting more children directly in harm's way?" - Jason Buchanan, Rovi, The New York Times.

"Rhode Island filmmaker Mary Healey-Conlon's documentary gives the victims of the Catholic Church a collective voice. It's chilling to hear grown men and women describe their sexual abuse at the hands of trusted priests while seeing footage of those very priests flash across the screen. It's shocking to hear, from the mouth of a perpetrator priest, about the 'homoerotic' church-run treatment centers, or about how boys over the age of 14 were considered 'fair game as long as you didn't get caught.' And it's distressing to hear, through Healey-Conlon's personal narrative, how Church leadership opted for administrative solutions (the 'geographical cure'). In just under an hour, Healey-Conlon offers a crash course in the historical, legal, religious, and cultural aspects of the Church's scandal. But the film never feels superficial. We are, as one survivor says, 'learning about what we don't want to learn about,' and through that process, gaining a necessary 'knowledge of evil.'" - Deirdre Fulton, The Boston Phoenix, 2005.

Holy Water-Gate was the Grand Winner of the Rhode Island International Film Awards for Best Documentary in 2005.

Recipient of the CINE Golden Eagle Award, 2005.
