= Salvatore Ronald Matano =

American Catholic prelate (born 1946)

His Excellency, The Most Reverend Salvatore Ronald Matano
- Bishop Emeritus of Rochester
- Diocese: Rochester
- Appointed: November 26, 2013
- Installed: January 3, 2014
- Retired: January 7, 2026
- Predecessor: Matthew H. Clark
- Successor: John S. Bonnici
- Previous posts: Secretary to the Apostolic Nuncio of the United States (1991); Bishop of Burlington (2005-2014)

Orders
- Ordination: December 17, 1971 by James Aloysius Hickey
- Consecration: April 19, 2005 by Gabriel Montalvo Higuera, Seán Patrick O'Malley, and Kenneth Anthony Angell

Personal details
- Born: September 15, 1946 (age 80) Providence, Rhode Island, U.S.
- Denomination: Catholic Church
- Parents: Salvatore and Mary Matano
- Education: Our Lady of Providence Seminary College; Pontifical Gregorian University
- Motto: In unitatem fidei (Latin for 'To the unity of the faith') Styles
- Reference style: His Excellency; The Most Reverend
- Spoken style: Your Excellency
- Religious style: Bishop

Salvatore Ronald Matano (born September 15, 1946) is a retired American Catholic prelate who served as Bishop of Rochester from 2013 to 2026. He previously served as Bishop of Burlington from 2005 to 2013.

== Early life ==
Matano was born on September 15, 1946, in Providence, Rhode Island to Salvatore and Mary (née Santaniello) Matano. He attended St. Ann Elementary School and La Salle Academy in Providence. After graduating from high school, Matano decided to become a priest. He entered Our Lady of Providence Seminary College in Providence, where he obtained his Bachelor of Arts in philosophy.

== Priesthood ==
Matano was ordained into the priesthood for the Diocese of Providence by Bishop James Hickey on December 17, 1971, in St. Peter's Basilica in Rome. In 1972, Matano received his Licentiate of Sacred Theology from the Pontifical Gregorian University in Rome.

After finishing his studies in Rome, Matano returned to Providence in 1972. The diocese then assigned him as assistant pastor at Our Lady of Grace Parish in Johnston, Rhode Island. In 1973, he was placed on the faculty of Our Lady of Providence Seminary High School, where he taught for the next four years. In 1977, Matano was named director of priest personnel for the diocese. In 1980, Bishop Louis Gelineau appointed Matano as diocesan assistant chancellor.

Matano returned to Rome for graduate studies, receiving his Doctor of Canon Law degree in 1983. After finishing in Rome, Gelineau named Matano as vicar for administration and co-chancellor. The Vatican elevated him to the rank of honorary prelate in 1985. In 1991, Matano spent a year in Washington, D.C., acting as the secretary to the apostolic nuncio of the United States, Archbishop Agostino Cacciavillan. In 1992, Gelineau selected Matano to serve as vicar general and moderator of the curia for the diocese. The Vatican designated him as a protonotary apostolic in 1993.

In 1995, Matano became a special lecturer for undergraduate and graduate students in the Department of Theology at Providence College. In 1997, Matano gave up his positions in the church hierarchy to become a parish priest at St. Sebastian's Parish in Providence. In January 2000, Matano returned to Washington to serve as secretary to the new apostolic nuncio of the United States, Archbishop Gabriel Higuera.

== Coadjutor Bishop and Bishop of Burlington ==
Coat of arms as bishop of Burlington

On March 3, 2005, Matano was appointed coadjutor bishop of Burlington by Pope John Paul II to assist Bishop Kenneth Angell. Matano received his episcopal consecration on April 19, 2005, at the Co-Cathedral of St. Joseph in Burlington from Higuera, with Archbishop Seán O'Malley and Angell serving as co-consecrators. Matano succeeded Angell as the ninth bishop of Burlington on November 9, 2005.

As bishop, Matano created a pastoral plan that merged some parishes to cope with the shortage of priests and allow sharing of parish resources and facilities. In 2008, Matano attended most of an 11-day civil trial of a lawsuit alleging sexual abuse of a minor by a diocesan priest.

== Bishop of Rochester ==
On November 6, 2013, Pope Francis named Matano to succeed Bishop Matthew H. Clark as bishop of Rochester. Matano's installation took place on January 3, 2014. On August 18, 2018, Matano sent a letter to all parishioners in the diocese, expressing his outrage on the sexual abuse of children and young adults by diocese priests:

"I cannot express adequately my sorrow for the pain, suffering and turmoil endured by the victims of child sexual abuse, especially when it is committed by the very ones who were so trusted and so grievously betrayed that very trust."

On September 1, 2019, Matano returned to St. Augustine’s Parish in Providence, where he had previously served as a priest. He celebrated a Mass with parishioners. In July 2021, Matano attended a forum in Auburn, New York, for parishioners who were concerned about plans to close four churches in that city. During the meeting, he made this statement: "As has been mentioned tonight, we are like a family. But how many times do families have to make sacrifices?" Matano currently sits on the board of trustees of St. John's Seminary in Boston.

In December 2018, Monsignor James Kruse of the Diocese of Peoria claimed that Matano was blocking the canonization cause of Bishop Fulton Sheen. Sheen, who hosted the national television show Life Is Worth Living in the 1950s, had served as bishop in Rochester and then in Peoria. Kruse claimed that Matano had provided the Vatican with documents that raised suspicions that Sheen had mishandled sexual abuse allegations against two priests in Rochester.

== Retirement ==
On August 30, 2021, Matano announced that he would submit his mandatory resignation letter to Francis when he reached the age of 75 that September. In a letter to the faithful of the diocese, he expressed his wishes to stay as bishop until the bankruptcy process was completed to relieve his successor of the "painful situation". He also added that it was ultimately up to the Pope to decide when he would retire and that many other bishops in the United States have been kept in their roles long after they reached the age of 75 while waiting for the appointment of their successors.

On January 7, 2026, Pope Leo XIV accepted his resignation as Bishop of Rochester and named John S. Bonnici, who previously served as Auxiliary bishop of the Archdiocese of New York, as his successor.

== See also ==
- Catholic Church hierarchy
- Catholic Church in the United States
- Historical list of the Catholic bishops of the United States
- List of Catholic bishops of the United States
- Lists of patriarchs, archbishops, and bishops

== Episcopal succession ==
Catholic Church titles
Preceded by Matthew H. Clark	Bishop of Rochester; 2014–2026	Succeeded by John S. Bonnici
Preceded by Kenneth Anthony Angell	Bishop of Burlington; 2005–2014	Succeeded by Christopher J. Coyne
