= Sneakers =

Sport and casual shoes

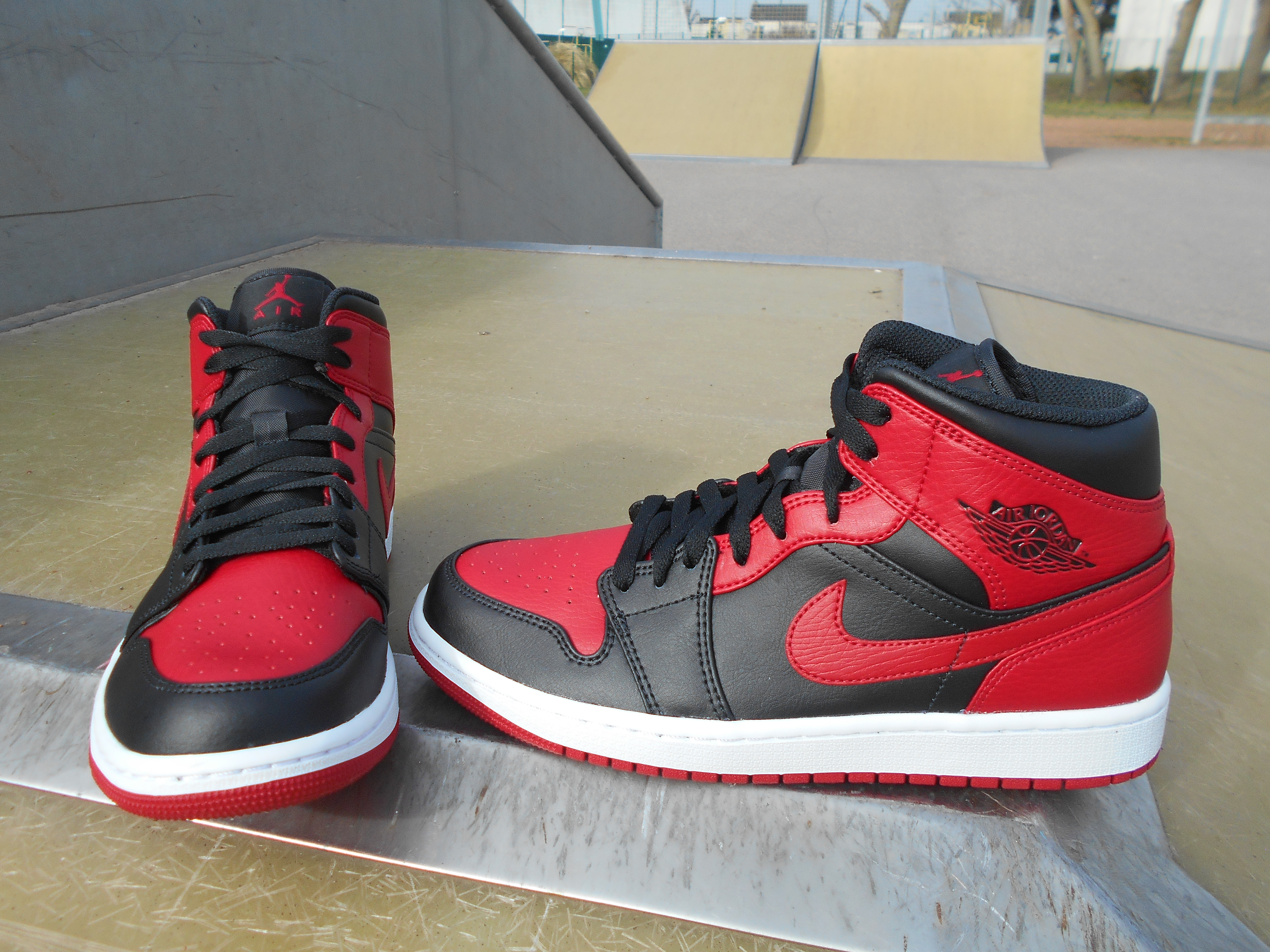
A pair of Nike Air Jordan 1 sneakers

Sneakers (US) or trainers (UK), also known by a wide variety of other names, are shoes primarily designed for sports or other forms of physical exercise, but are also widely used for everyday casual wear.

They were popularized by companies such as Converse, Nike and Spalding in the mid 20th century. Like other parts of the global clothing industry, shoe manufacturing is heavily concentrated in Asia with nine in ten shoes produced there.

== Names ==
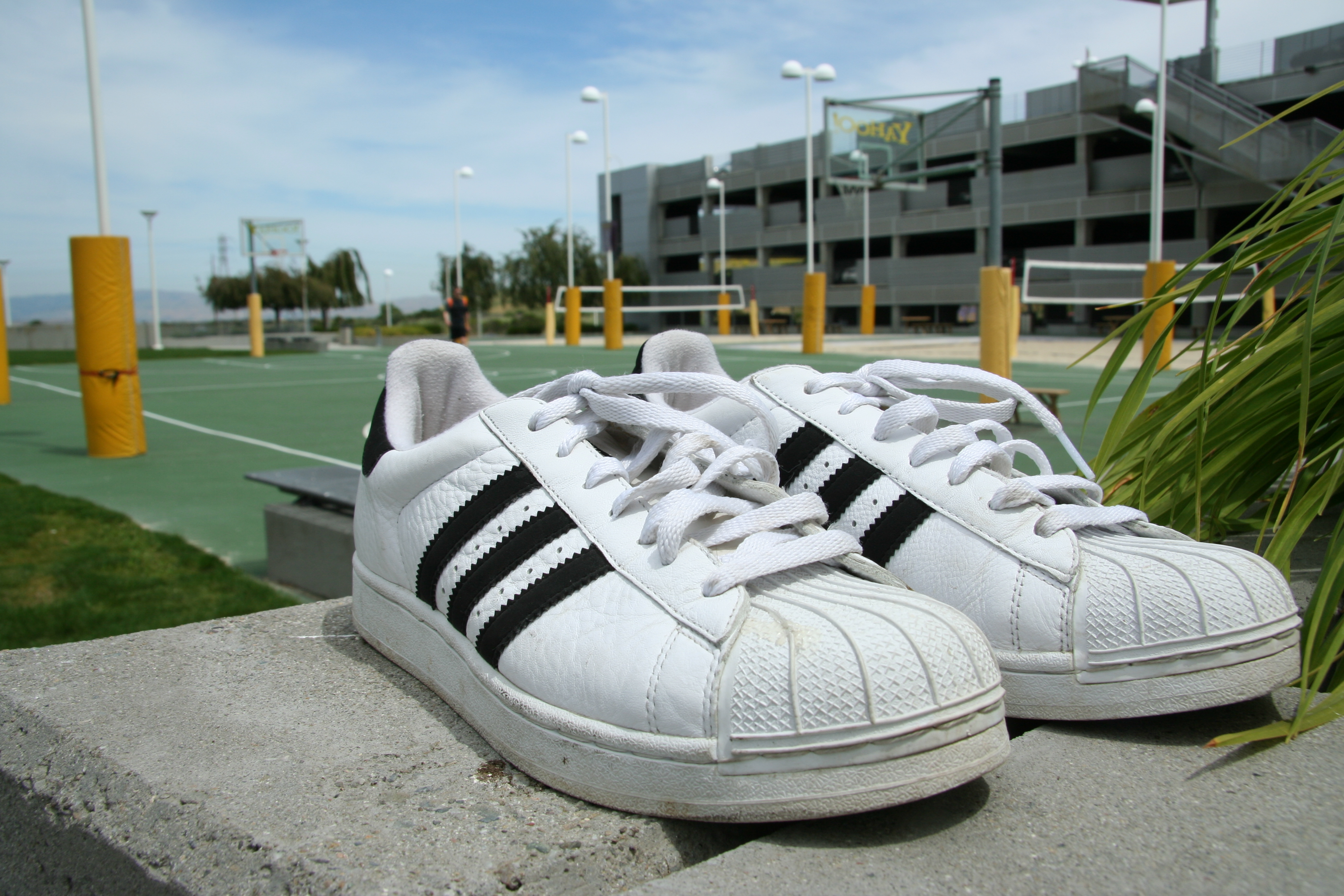
The Adidas Superstar was originally designed as a basketball shoe.

Sneakers have gone by a variety of names, depending on geography and changing over the decades. The broader category inclusive of sneakers is athletic shoes. The term athletic shoes is typically used for shoes utilized for jogging or road running and indoor sports such as basketball, but tends to exclude shoes for sports played on grass such as association football and rugby football, which are generally known in North America as cleats and in British English as boots or studs.

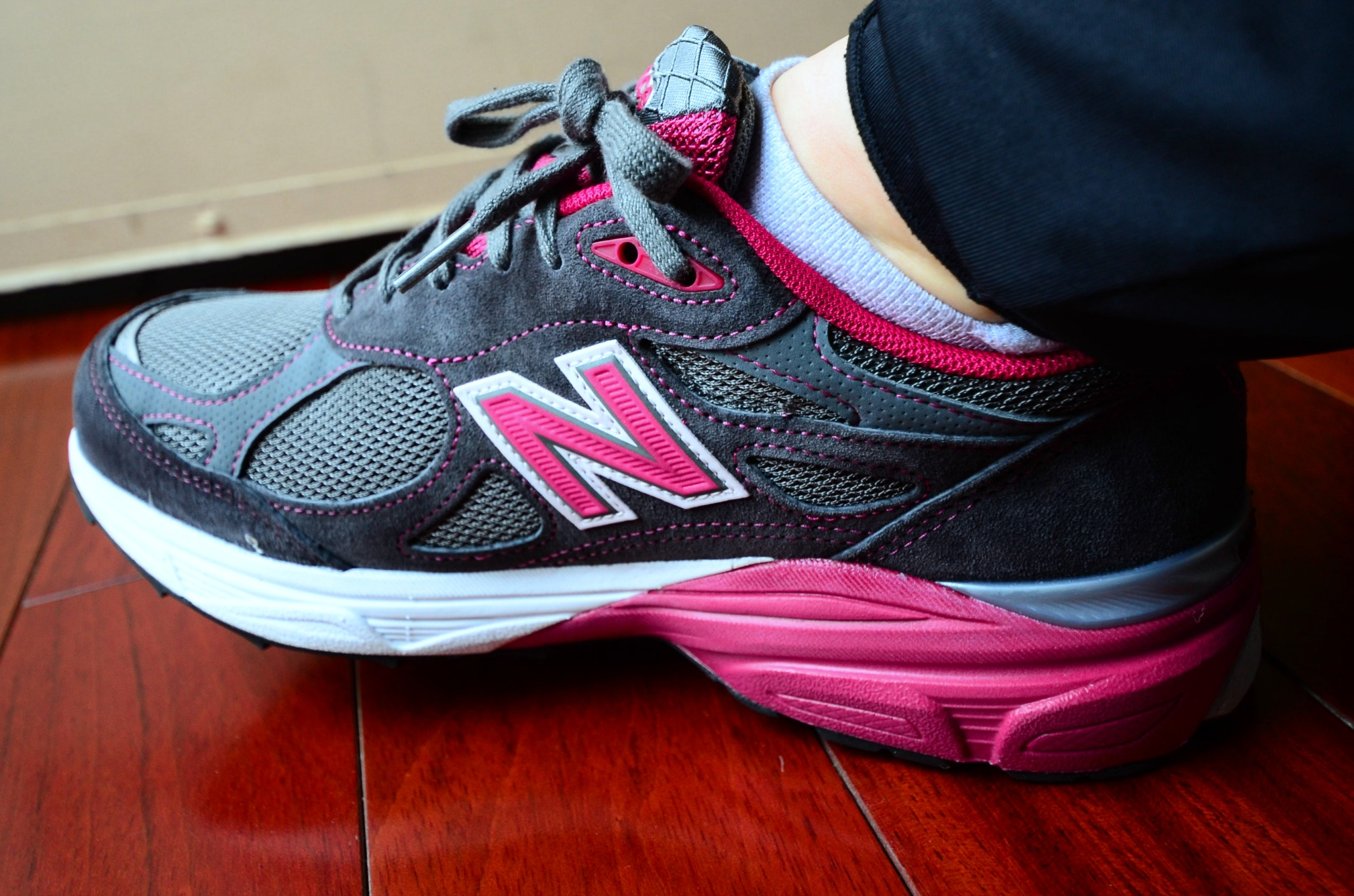
New Balance 99X Series

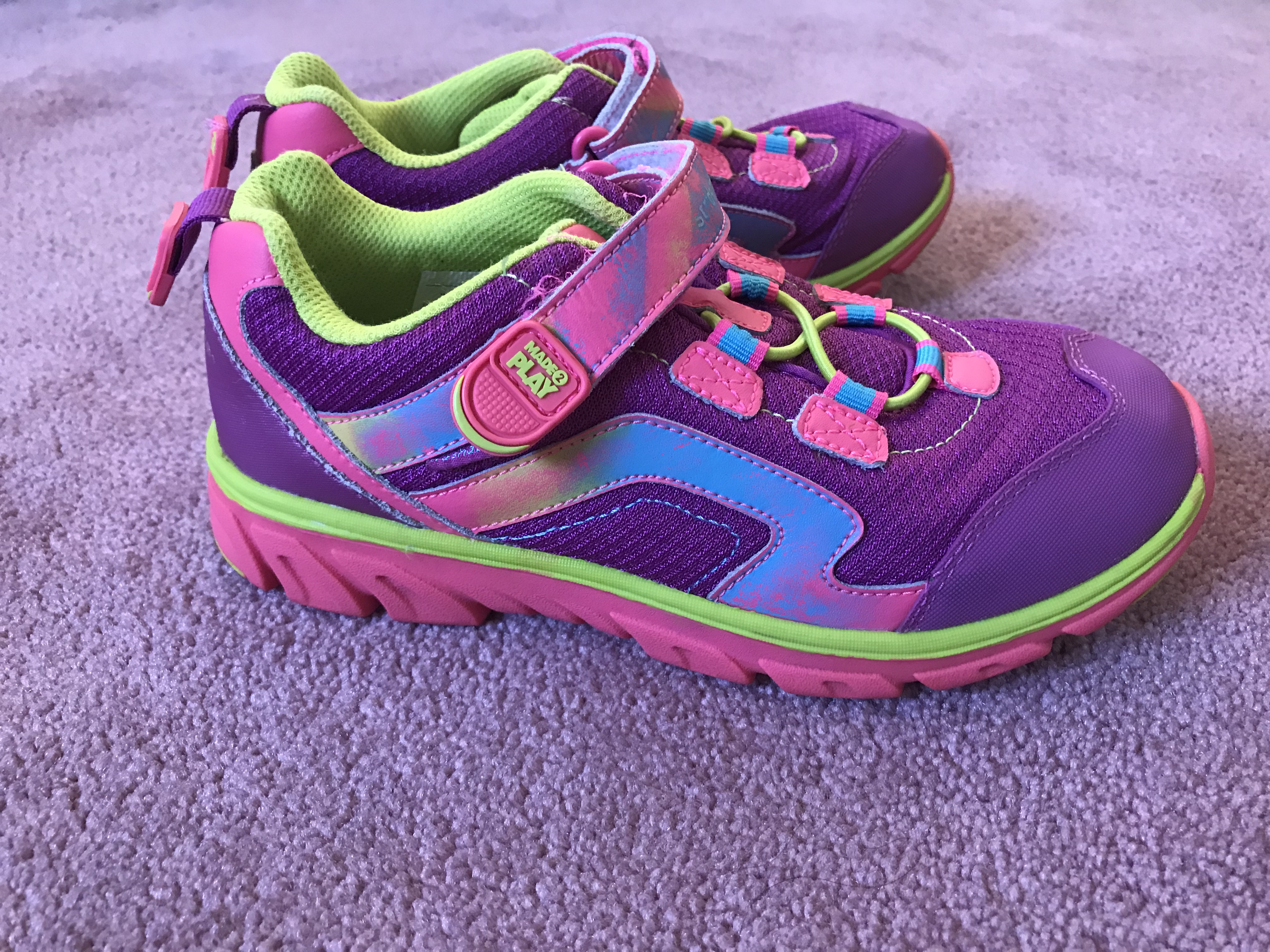
A pair of children's sneakers

The word "sneaker" is often attributed to American Henry Nelson McKinney, who was an advertising agent for N. W. Ayer & Son. In 1917, he used the term because the rubber sole made the shoe's wearer stealthy. The word was already in use at least as early as 1887, when the Boston Journal made reference to "sneakers" as "the name boys give to tennis shoes." The name "sneakers" originally referred to how quiet the rubber soles were on the ground, in contrast to noisy standard hard leather sole dress shoes. Someone wearing sneakers could "sneak up", while someone wearing standards could not. Earlier, the name "sneaks" had been used by prison inmates to refer to warders (guards) because of the rubber-soled shoes they wore. The term "sneakers" is most commonly used in Northeastern United States, Central and South Florida, Australia, New Zealand, and parts of Canada. However, in Australian, Canadian, and Scottish English, running shoes and runners are synonymous terms used to refer to sneakers, with the latter term also used in Hiberno-English. Tennis shoes and kicks are other terms used in Australian and North American English.

In British English, sneakers may be known as training shoes, pumps or 'basketball shoes'. Rubber-soled, low cut and canvas-topped shoes are known as plimsolls, daps, or flats. In Geordie English, sneakers may also be called sandshoes, gym boots, or joggers.

Several terms for sneakers exist in South Africa, including gym shoes, sports shoes and takkies. Other names for sneakers includes rubber shoes in Philippine English, track shoes in Singapore English, canvas shoes in Nigerian English, camboo ("camp boot") in Ghana English, and sportex in Greece.

In Latvia, any sneakers are still called botas after the Czech footwear company Botas, whose produce was one of the few foreign brands of sneakers available during the Soviet occupation. The same goes for botasky in Czech and Slovak (Botas was a Czechoslovak state-owned manufacturer back then). Another genericized trademark used in (ex-)Czechoslovakia is kecky (after Keds).

== History ==
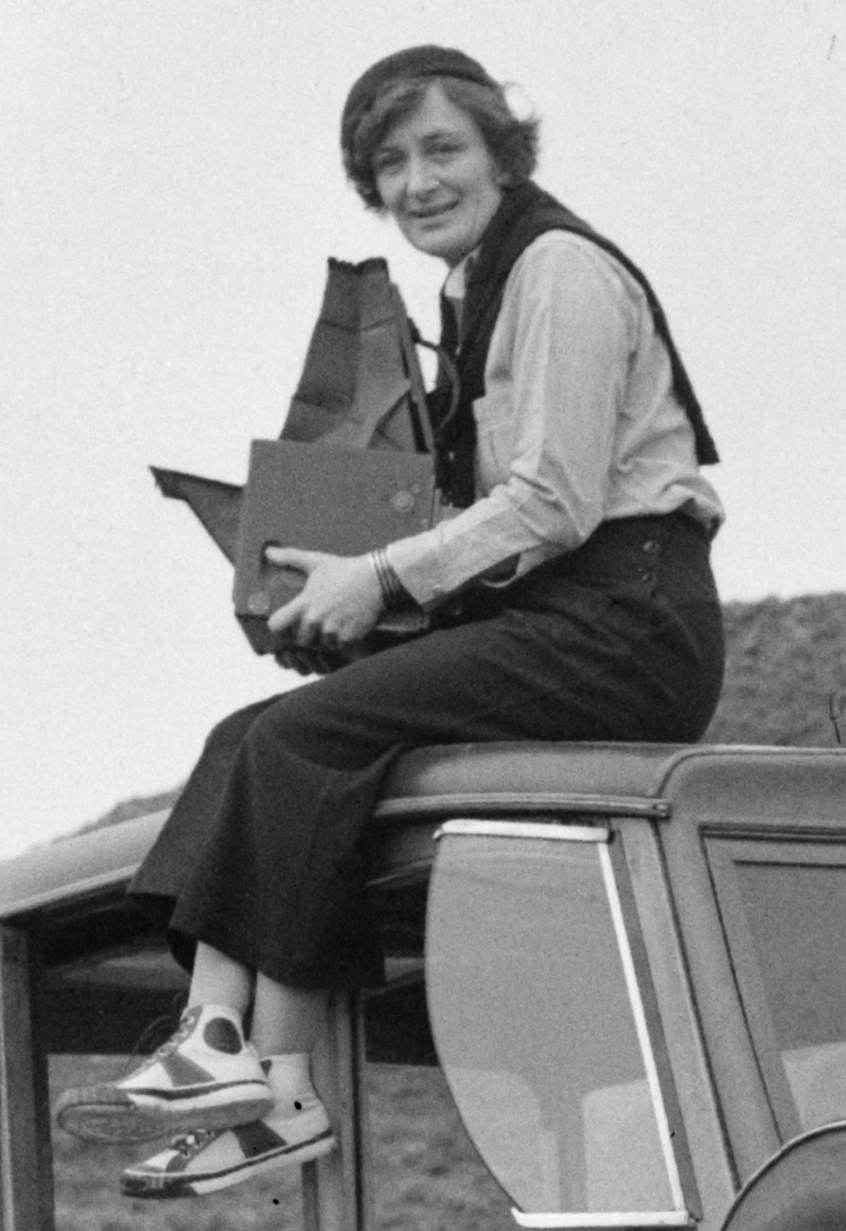
Photographer Dorothea Lange wearing sneakers, 1936

The plimsoll shoe originated in the United Kingdom, first called "sand shoe" until the 1870s. Plimsolls were widely worn by vacationers and also began to be worn by sportsmen on the tennis and croquet courts for their comfort. Special soles with engraved patterns to increase the surface grip of the shoe were developed, and these were ordered in bulk for the use of the British Army. Athletic shoes were increasingly used for leisure and outdoor activities at the turn of the 20th century. Plimsolls were even found with the ill-fated Scott Antarctic expedition of 1911. Plimsolls were commonly worn by pupils in schools' physical education lessons in the UK from the 1950s until the early 1970s.

British company J.W. Foster and Sons designed and produced the first shoes designed for running in 1895; the shoes were spiked to allow for greater traction and speed. The company sold its high-quality handmade running shoes to athletes around the world, eventually receiving a contract for the manufacture of running shoes for the British team in the 1924 Summer Olympics. Harold Abrahams and Eric Liddell won the 100 m and 400 m events, kitted out with Foster's running gear.

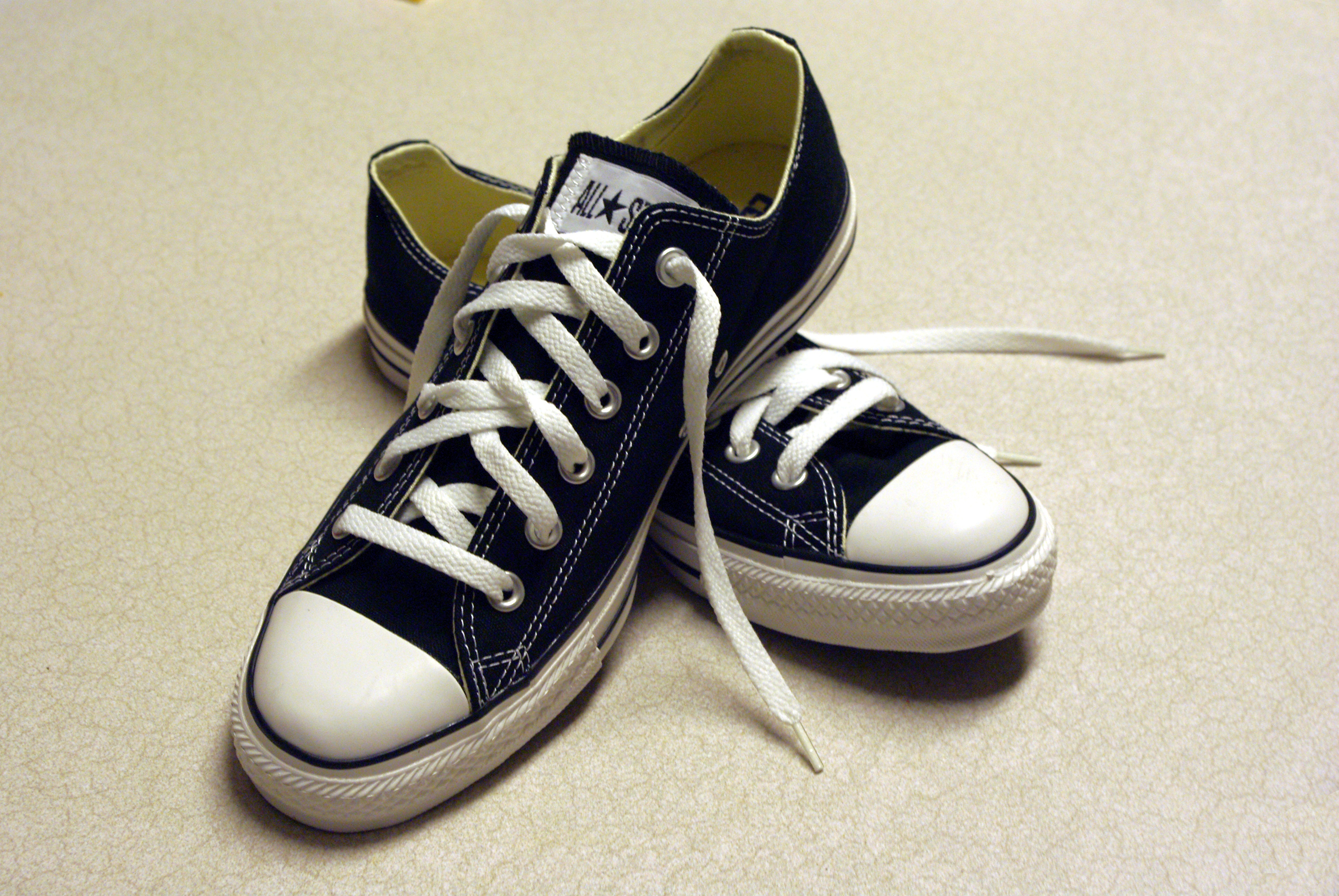
A pair of traditional low-cut Converse Chuck Taylor All Star sneakers. Its design has remained largely unchanged.

This style of footwear also became prominent in America at the turn of the 20th century, where they were called sneakers. In 1892, the U.S. Rubber Company introduced the first rubber-soled shoes in the country, sparking a surge in demand and production. The first basketball shoes were designed by Spalding as early as 1907. The market for sneakers grew after World War I, when sports and athletics increasingly became a way to demonstrate moral fiber and patriotism. The U.S. market for sneakers grew steadily as young boys lined up to buy Converse All Stars sneakers endorsed by basketball player Chuck Taylor.

During the interwar period, athletic shoes began to be marketed for different sports, and differentiated designs were made available for men. Athletic shoes were used by competing athletes at the Olympics, helping to popularise them among the general public. In 1936, a French brand, Spring Court, marketed the first canvas tennis shoe featuring signature eight ventilation channels on a vulcanised natural rubber sole.

Adolf "Adi" Dassler began producing his own sports shoes in his mother's wash kitchen in Herzogenaurach, Bavaria, after his return from World War I, and went on to establish one of the leading athletic shoe manufacturers, Adidas. He also successfully marketed his shoes to athletes at the 1936 Summer Olympics, which helped cement his good reputation. Business boomed and the Dasslers were selling 200,000 pairs of shoes each year before World War II.

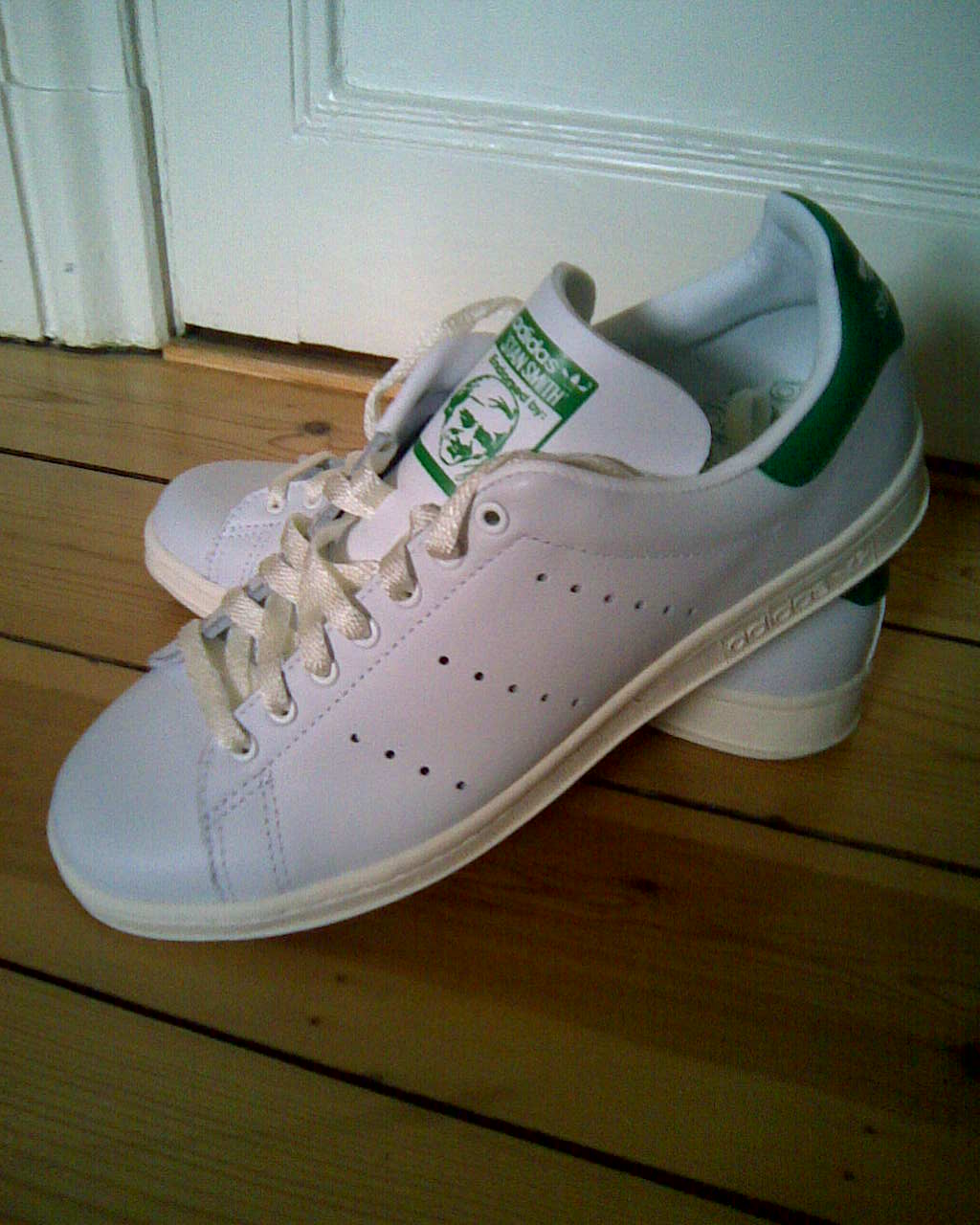
Adidas Stan Smith of the 1980s

During the 1950s, leisure opportunities greatly expanded, and children and adolescents began to wear sneakers as school dress codes relaxed. Sneaker sales rose so high, they began to adversely affect the sales of conventional leather shoes, leading to a fierce advertising war for market share in the late '50s. In the 1970s, jogging for exercise became increasingly popular, and trainers designed specifically for comfort while jogging sold well. Companies also started to target some of their products at the casual fashion market. Soon, shoes were available for football, jogging, basketball, running, etc. Many sports had their relevant shoe, made possible by podiatrist development of athletic shoe technology.

During the 1990s, shoe companies perfected their fashion and marketing skills. Sports endorsements with famous athletes grew larger, and marketing budgets marketing budgets increased greatly. Sneakers became a fashion statement and were marketed as a definition of identity and personality rather than simply athletic aids.

Also during the 1990s, various vendors began producing "walking shoes" for adults using the construction technology of sneakers but visually resembling traditional leather shoes. The combination of a traditional look with increased comfort rapidly achieved wide popularity and by 2010 was displacing sales of leather shoes for adults in a parallel with the post-1950 success of sneakers among children. The shift was especially noticeable in combination with business-casual clothing.

From 1970 (five models), to 1998 (285 models), to 2012 (3,371), the number of sport shoe models in the U.S. has grown exponentially.

== Use in sports ==
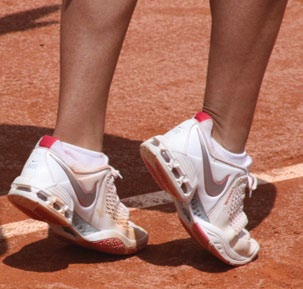
A pair of modern Nike all-purpose athletic shoes

Sneakers intended for sports have a flexible sole, appropriate tread for the function, and ability to absorb impact. As the industry and designs have expanded, the term "athletic shoes" is based more on the design of the bottom of the shoe than the aesthetics of the top of the shoe. Today's designs include sandals, Mary Janes, and even elevated styles suitable for running, dancing, and jumping.

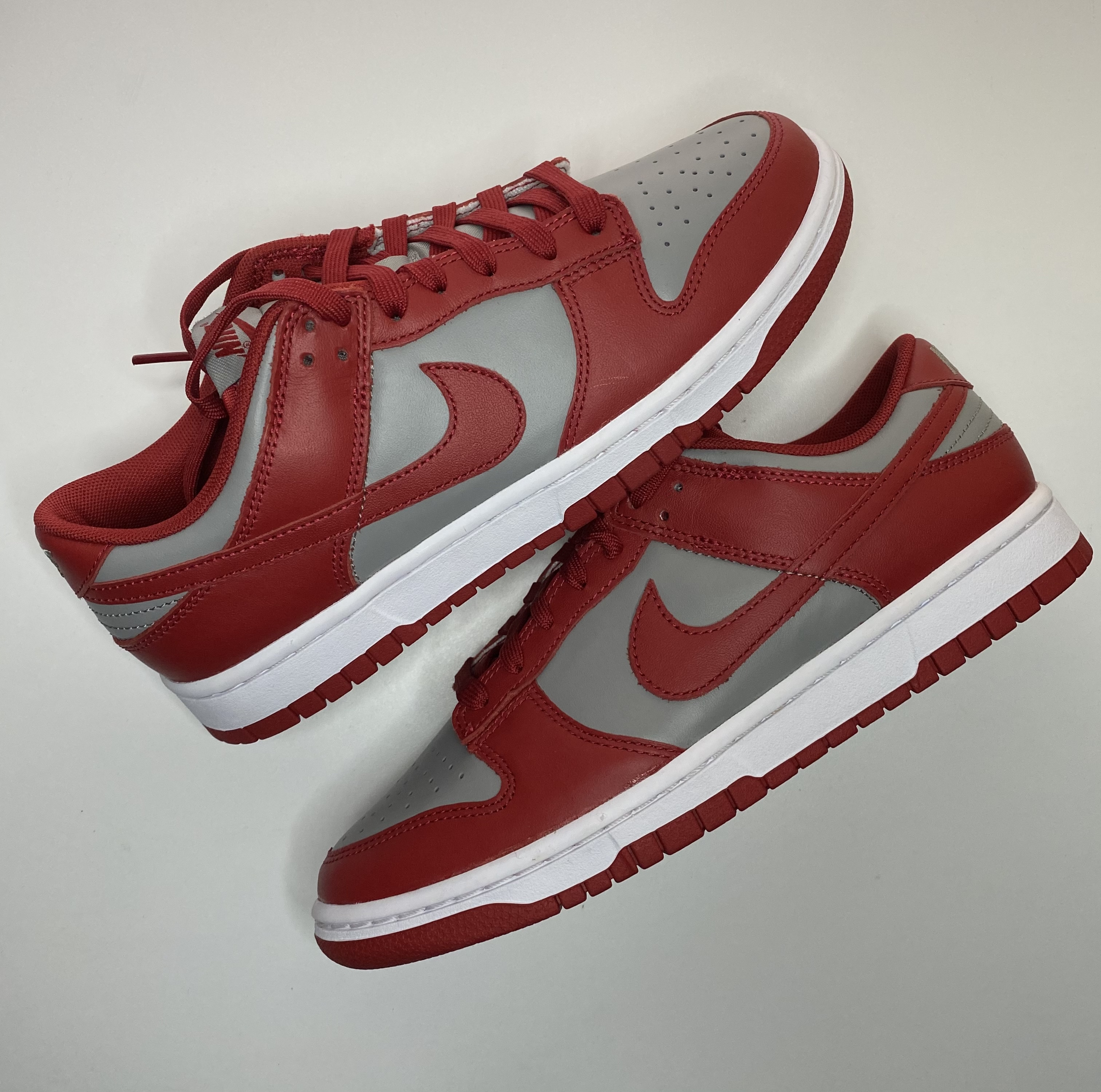
Nike Dunk basketball shoes

The shoes themselves are made of flexible compounds, typically featuring a sole made of dense rubber. While the original design was basic, manufacturers have since tailored athletic shoes for their specific purposes. An example of this is the spiked shoe developed for track running. Some of these shoes are made up to unusually large sizes for athletes with large feet.

Sneakers intended for running come in a range of shapes suited to different purposes. Generally, they are divided by running style: the majority are for heel-toe joggers/runners which are further subdivided into 'neutral', 'overpronation' and 'underpronation'. However, most evidence-based comparisons show no reduction in lower-limb running injuries from prescribing different types of shoe for different foot types. The shoes are constructed with a complex structure of "rubber" with plastic/metal stiffeners to restrict foot movement. More advanced runners tend to wear flatter and flexible shoes, which allow them to run more quickly with greater comfort.

According to the NPD Group, one in four pairs of running shoes that were sold in the United States in 2016 were bought from an online retailer.

== Notable brands ==
As of 2020, brands with global popularity include:

- 361 Degrees
- Adidas
- Allbirds
- Anta
- Asics
- Babolat
- Brooks
- Converse
- DC
- Diadora
- Dunlop
- Ethletic
- Feiyue
- Fila
- Hoka One One
- Hummel
- Hurley International
- Kappa
- Karhu
- K-Swiss
- Keds
- Li-Ning
- Lotto
- Merrell
- Mizuno
- New Balance
- Nike
- On
- Onitsuka Tiger
- PF Flyers
- Pony
- Pro-Keds
- Puma
- Reebok
- Salomon
- Saucony
- Skechers
- Stride Rite
- Supra
- Tisza Cipő
- Umbro
- Under Armour
- Vans
- World Balance
- Xtep

== Culture ==
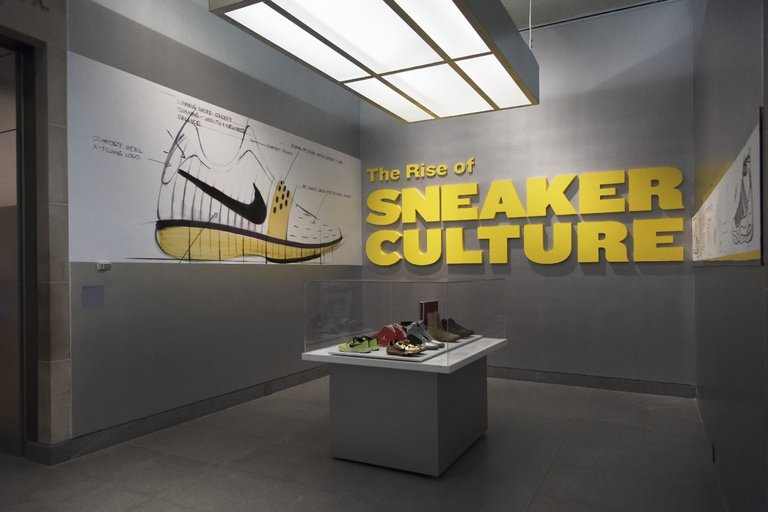
Exhibition The Rise of Sneaker Culture at the Brooklyn Museum

Sneakers have been an important part of hip hop (primarily Pumas, Nike, and Adidas) and rock 'n roll (Converse, Vans) cultures since the 1970s. Hip hop artists sign million dollar deals with major brands such as Nike, Adidas, or Puma to promote their shoes. Sneaker collectors, called "sneakerheads", regard sneakers as fashionable items. Sneaker companies encourage this trend by producing rare sneakers in limited numbers, often at very high retail prices. The resale markets became a huge part of the sneaker culture. Artistically-modified sneakers can sell for upwards of $1000 at exclusive establishments like Saks Fifth Avenue. In 2005, a documentary, Just for Kicks, about the sneaker phenomenon and history was released.

== Technology ==
Sneaker manufacturing has several stages such as making the designs and patterns, cutting the materials, needlework, assembling, and then a finished product. manufacturers use special machines during production to put together different pieces of shoe components. they also use other machines like roasting and sole-attaching machines to shape and attach the sole into the shoe. A future-prediction report issued by Accenture in 2015 anticipated that future running shoes and other sport wear could report when they need to be replaced based on a wearer's exercise schedule.

== Sustainability ==
Contemporary sneakers are largely made from synthetic materials, and the materials and manufacturing process produce, on average, about 14 kg (31 lb) of CO_{2} emissions. Some companies are trying to substitute more sustainable materials in their manufacture. About 90% of shoes end up in landfill sites at end of life.

The United States athletic shoe market is a $13 billion-per-year industry that sells more than 350 million pairs of athletic shoes annually. The global footwear consumption has nearly doubled every twenty years, from 2.5 billion pairs in 1950 to more than 19 billion pairs of shoes in 2005. The increase in demand for athletic shoe products has progressively decreased the useful lives of shoes as a result of the rapid market changes and new consumer trends. Shorter life cycles of athletic footwear have begun to create non-degradable waste in landfills due to synthetic and other non-biodegradable materials used in production. The considerable growth in industrial production and consumption has made the athletic footwear industry face the environmental challenge of generated end-of-life waste.

== See also ==
- Comparison of orthotics
- List of shoe styles
- Shoe tossing
