= Autonomie project =

Defunct fashion company in the United States

Autonomie Project was a fair trade, eco-friendly, and vegan fashion company based out of Boston, MA, in the United States. The company began in 2007 when group of friends who were frustrated with the fashion and footwear industries due to their lack of transparency and use of sweatshops and harmful chemicals. Autonomie Project produced shoes, flip flops, hand bags, T-shirts, winter hats and accessories. They worked with small, independent cooperatives and fair trade certified facilities located in developing areas of the world including Pakistan, Sri Lanka, Peru, and the US. As well as being fair trade certified, the company used eco-friendly products as much as possible such as organic cottons and Forest Stewardship Council certified sustainable all natural rubber. Autonomie Project certified all products and materials all the way down the supply chain were vegan, produced by fair trade standards, and were environmentally friendly.

Autonomie Project is a Co-op America certified green business and their sneakers were given an A-plus in Co-op America's Back to School Shoe Guide. The company was involved in fair trade initiatives through the Talon Workers' Welfare Fund. They also work closely with Trees for the Future and The Haitian Project. Both the sneakers and flip flops produced by Autonomie Project have received positive reviews from Life Goggles and Leafy Green Info.

Autonomie Project also keeps up a blog on Wordpress.com where they discuss fair trade and environmental issues as well as current events and vegan recipes.
