= Louverture Cleary School =

Coordinates: 18°36′23.26″N 72°16′21.4″W

- Croix des Bouquets, Ouest; Haiti

Information
- School type: Secondary Education School
- Religious affiliation: Catholic Church
- Established: 1987
- Grades: 7–12
- Website: haitianproject.org

Louverture Cleary School is a Catholic boarding school located in Croix-des-Bouquets, Haiti.

== History ==
Louverture Cleary School, founded in 1987 by The Haitian Project and St. Joseph's Parish in Providence, Rhode Island, is a tuition free, co-educational, Catholic boarding school that serves the greater Port-au-Prince area. Louverture Cleary students are academically gifted and live in some of the poorest neighborhoods of Port-au-Prince. All students are required to pass an entrance exam and each year students take courses in four languages: Kreyòl, French, English, and Spanish.

Louverture Cleary School has been recognized as one of the top secondary schools in Haiti and almost 100 percent of its Philo students pass the national baccalaureate exam each year. Louverture Cleary School is also one of the only schools in Haiti to progressively teach in four languages.

Louverture Cleary School is the sister school of Bishop Ireton High School in Alexandria, Virginia.

== Academics ==
Louverture Cleary School's core curriculum adheres to the standards set by the Haitian Ministry of Education. These classes are supplemented by courses in Computer Science, Religion, English, and Spanish.

== The Vision ==
Louverture Cleary School will be the flagship school of The Louverture Cleary Schools Network, a system of ten tuition-free, Catholic, co-educational secondary boarding schools—one in each diocese of Haiti—providing 3,600 students with a quality education steeped in service and 1,200 alumni with scholarships to Haitian universities each year.

Construction officially began in June 2021 on the $7.4 million Model Campus project, Phase One of the Louverture Cleary School Network plan. This first phase encompasses site development and construction of the Model Campus, as well as the development of the sites and initial buildings for LCS 3 and 4.

== See also ==
- List of schools in Haiti
