= Kenneth Angell =

American prelate

His Excellency, The Most Reverend Kenneth Anthony Angell
- Bishop of Burlington
- Diocese: Roman Catholic Diocese of Burlington
- See: Burlington
- In office: November 9, 1992—November 9, 2005
- Predecessor: John Aloysius Marshall
- Successor: Salvatore Ronald Matano
- Previous post: Auxiliary Bishop of Providence (1974–1992)

Orders
- Ordination: May 26, 1957 by Russell McVinney
- Consecration: October 7, 1974 by Louis Gelineau, John Whealon, and John Hackett

Personal details
- Born: August 3, 1930 Providence, Rhode Island, U.S.
- Died: October 4, 2016 (aged 86) Winooski, Vermont, U.S.
- Denomination: Roman Catholic Church
- Motto: Serve the Lord with gladness

Kenneth Anthony Angell (August 3, 1930 – October 4, 2016) was an American prelate of the Catholic Church. He served as Bishop of Burlington in Vermont from 1992 to 2005. He previously served as an auxiliary bishop of the Diocese of Providence in Rhode Island from 1974 to 1992.

== Biography ==
=== Early life ===
One of three children, Kenneth Angell was born on August 3, 1930, in Providence, Rhode Island, to Henry and Mae (née Cooney) Angell. His brother was the television producer David Angell. After attending public elementary schools in East Providence, Rhode Island, he studied at Our Lady of Providence Seminary in Warwick, Rhode Island and at St. Mary's Seminary in Baltimore, Maryland.

=== Priesthood ===
Angell was ordained to the priesthood at the Cathedral of Saints Peter and Paul in Providence by Bishop Russell McVinney for the Diocese of Providence on May 26, 1957. He then served as parochial vicar at St. Mark Parish in Jamestown, Rhode Island, and at Sacred Heart Parish in Pawtucket, Rhode Island. After serving at St. Mary's Parish in Newport, Rhode Island, Angell then received his first pastorate at St. John's Parish in Providence.

From 1968 to 1972, Angell served as assistant chancellor for the diocese and secretary to Bishop McVinney. He served as chancellor under Bishop Louis Gelineau from 1972 to 1974 and was raised to the rank of monsignor by the Vatican in December 1972. Angell became vicar general of the diocese in August 1974.

=== Auxiliary Bishop of Providence ===
On August 9, 1974, Angell was appointed auxiliary bishop of Providence and Titular Bishop of Septimunicia by Pope Paul VI. He received his episcopal consecration on October 7, 1974, from Bishop Louis Gelineau, with Archbishop John Whealon and Bishop John Hackett serving as co-consecrators, at the Cathedral of Saints Peter and Paul.

In 1989, Angell promised to "take care of it" when Reverend Normand Demers was arrested and jailed for misconduct with boys while working at The Haitian Project; Demers was later brought back to work in the diocese. Angell testified in a 1990 lawsuit that he did not take allegations against another priest, Reverend William O'Connell, seriously. O'Connell was later convicted and served a short sentence before moving to New Jersey, where he committed more crimes and died in prison.

=== Bishop of Burlington ===
Angell was named the eighth bishop of Burlington by Pope John Paul II on October 6, 1992. Angell was installed at the Cathedral of the Immaculate Conception in Burlington on November 9, 1992.Faced with a shortage of priests in Burlington, and a decline in weekly mass attendance, Angell consolidated Sacred Heart and St. Francis de Sales Parishes in Bennington, Vermont. He also consolidated St. Cecilia and St. Frances Cabrini Parishes in East Barre, Vermont, and closed Our Lady of the Lake Parish in St. Albans, Vermont. After the death of his brother David on September 11, 2001, during the hijacking of American Airlines Flight 11, Angel remarked.

"Our family was devastated, and yet in times of such crisis you get strength that's rather incredible. You don't really know where it comes from. It comes ultimately from God, but it comes through many people who are supportive. It comes from one's faith and the belief that the Lord takes care of us, and that his will must be done."

Angell was criticized for his management of sexual abuse allegations during his tenure as auxiliary bishop in Providence, which announced a $13.5 million settlement in 36 different lawsuits in 2002. Records showed that Angell allowed six accused priests to remain in active ministry in the diocese. He refused to identify the priests publicly, but provided their names to the Vermont Attorney General and placed them under suspension. At a news conference in March 2005, Angell described the sexual abuse scandals as the most difficult challenge he faced during his time as bishop. He said,

"People have been so shocked by all of this and it's a wonderful compliment to us really, in the sense that they expect so much more of us than anyone else and we shouldn't fail them. It's been very difficult and difficult for these priests too [who] have been in trouble. The victims first and foremost have my concern. After that I think of the priests how because of one, one little lapse or something, something terrible happened. I can't help but feel sorry for them. I decry what they did."

=== Retirement and death ===
Angell received Bishop Salvatore Matano as his coadjutor bishop in April 2005.

Upon reaching the mandatory retirement age of 75, Angell submitted his letter of resignation to Pope Benedict XVI in August 2005. The pope accepted his resignation on November 9, 2005. Kenneth Angell died in Winooski, Vermont, on October 4, 2016, from a stroke.

== Viewpoints ==
=== Iraq invasion ===
In response to the American invasion of Iraq in March 2003, Angell said,

"Our hopes of avoiding war were quashed today, but our prayers for peace will not end until this war does.... We pray for the safety and deliverance of the innocent citizens in Iraq, that they be protected from harm and freed from oppression. We pray their terror will be of short duration and that their rewards will be a new country based on freedom and democratic principles, supported by a united international community."

=== Capital punishment ===
In 2001, Angell wrote to the Vermont General Assembly to express his opposition to capital punishment, saying,

"We must not perpetuate the crime of murder by becoming a society that kills for retribution.... We must not promote or justify a culture of vengeance. We cannot hope to teach that killing is wrong by killing."

=== Same-sex marriage ===
A strong opponent of same-sex marriage, he unsuccessfully campaigned against H.B. 847 in the Vermont General Assembly, which granted civil unions to same-sex couples with the same rights and privileges accorded to married couples in 2000. Speaking to the Vermont House of Representatives, he said,

"Do not let the court or anybody else push you around. You have no duty, moral or constitutional, to weaken the institution of marriage. If the court thinks otherwise, then let the people overrule the court. This is the United States of America. We are not ruled by kings, whether on a throne or in the courtroom."

Catholic Church titles
Preceded by John Aloysius Marshall	Bishop of Burlington; 1992–2005	Succeeded by Salvatore Ronald Matano
Preceded by –	Auxiliary Bishop of Providence; 1974–1992	Succeeded by –
