= The Haitian Project =

The Haitian Project INC
- Founded: 1987
- Founder: Parishioners of St. Joseph's Parish
- Purpose: Education
- Location: Providence, Rhode Island
- Region served: Haiti
- Website: haitianproject.org

The Haitian Project, Inc. is a Providence, Rhode Island–based Roman Catholic non-profit organization dedicated to education in Haiti. Since 1987, it has operated Louverture Cleary School, a Catholic secondary school in Croix des Bouquets, Haiti.

== History ==
In 1987, The Haitian Project established Louverture Cleary School, a Catholic boarding school in Croix des Bouquets, Haiti. Brian Moynihan was a benefactor of the school; his brother Patrick became director of it. Patrick, formerly a commodities trader for Louis Dreyfus Commodities, was president from 1996 until he stepped down on December 31, 2019.

== Current activities ==
Over 350 secondary students attend the flagship tuition-free boarding school, Louverture Cleary School Santo 5, in Port-au-Prince, with a majority attending universities in Haiti upon graduation.

== See also ==
- Autonomie project
- List of schools in Haiti
