= Church of St. Augustine (Larchmont, New York) =

Catholic church in Larchmont, New York

- Church of St. Augustine
- 40°55′35″N 73°45′00″W
- Location: Larchmont, New York
- Denomination: Catholic Church
- Website: staugustineny.org

History
- Status: Parish church
- Founded: 1892
- Dedicated: May 21, 1928

Architecture
- Style: Gothic Revival
- Completed: 1928

Administration
- Archdiocese: Archdiocese of New York

The Church of St. Augustine is a Roman Catholic church located in Larchmont, New York. The parish having been founded in 1892, the present Gothic Revival church building was constructed in 1928.

== History ==
With a growing number of Catholics living in Larchmont, New York—many of them domestic servants who attended Blessed Sacrament Church in New Rochelle or Most Holy Trinity Church in Mamaroneck—the Archbishop of New York, Michael Corrigan, created the parish of St. Augustine in 1892. The decision to establish a parish was motivated in part by the fact that the Larchmont Manor Company had offered to donate a parcel of land for the construction of a Catholic church within the village. When the company dissolved in 1891, organizers hurried to organize a congregation that could accept the land for a church. The first mass was said in the village hall on May 22, 1892. A building was erected on the northeast corner of Beach and Linden Avenues, half of whose funding came from local non-Catholics. The church's parochial school, which was staffed by the Sisters of St. Dominic of Newburg, New York, was dedicated in 1912 by Cardinal John Murphy Farley.

By 1921, the parish had outgrown its facilities that accommodated only 250 people, and a larger church was needed. As a temporary measure, the school was enlarged so that masses could be said there while a new church was built. The following year, the Beach Avenue church was closed, while a new rectory was built on Monroe Avenue. In 1926, the parish purchased the Amory Estate on Cherry Avenue, on which they would construct their new church.

The present, Gothic Revival church building was completed after 19 months of construction, and was dedicated on May 21, 1928, in a mass celebrated by Cardinal Patrick Joseph Hayes. The church purchased land between the school and the Larchmont Library for the construction of a new school. Groundbreaking occurred in 1940, and the building was completed the following year, seating 520 students. It was dedicated by then-Archbishop Francis Spellman. With enrollment reaching 675, an annex was added to the school in 1962. The Sisters of St. Dominic ceased their work at the school in 1973, and the school closed in 1976. Thereafter, it was rented to the French-American School of New York. The sanctuary of the church was renovated in 1990 in accordance with the prescriptions of the Second Vatican Council.

== List of pastors ==
In chronological order, the following priests have served as pastor of the church:

- Rev. Edmund Power (1892–1906)
- Rev. Patrick Morris (1906–1919)
- Rev. James Brady (1919–1936)
- Rev. Msgr. Thomas Deegan (1936–1964)
- Rev. Msgr. John J. Corrigan (1964–1968)
- Rev. John K. Daly (1968–1974)
- Rev. William V. Reynolds (1974–1987)
- Rev. Msgr. Walter F. Kenny (1987–2007)
- Rev. Msgr. Thomas R. Kelly (2007–2021)
- Bishop John S. Bonnici (2021-present)

== See also ==
- List of churches in the Roman Catholic Archdiocese of New York
