= Simin Saberi =

Iranian Baháʼí

- Born: Simin Saberi; March 2, 1959; Deh Bid, Iran
- Died: June 18, 1983 (aged 24); Adel Abad Prison, Shiraz, Iran
- Occupations: Diploma and employed by Marvdasht Agricultural Company
- Known for: Execution for membership in the Baháʼí Faith

Simin Saberi (Persian: سیمین صابری, also transliterated as Símín Sábirí; March 2, 1959 – June 18, 1983) was one of the victims of the Baháʼí community in Iran, who was sentenced to death by the Islamic Revolutionary Court for her beliefs and faith as a Baháʼí. At the age of 24, she was hanged by the Islamic Republic of Iran along with 9 other Baháʼí women in the Chogan Square of Shiraz. She has been characterised as 'one of the most fearless' of this group.

== Biography ==
Saberi was born on March 2, 1959, to a Baháʼí Faith family in Deh Bid Village in the city of Deh Bid, Arsanjan of Fars province. Their house was located 2 kilometers from Marvdasht. Her father, Hossein, was from a Muslim background but had adopted the Baha'i faith. Her mother, Tavoos Pompusian, Hossein's second wife, was from a Jewish background but her parents had become Baha'is. As well as two half-brothers and four half-sisters by Hossein's first marriage, Saberi was the youngest of Hossein's five children by Tavoos. Like her parents, she believed in the Baháʼí Faith. After finishing high school and receiving her diploma, she was employed by Marvdasht Agricultural Company due to her skills.

Saberi helped her mother and did tailoring. She often went to the psychiatric hospital along with her friends and helped the young girls there in their works. She spent time on the Bahaʼi Education Committee in Shiraz, and became the youngest assistant to a member of the Auxiliary Board.

== During the time of the Iranian Revolution ==
In the midst of the 1979 Revolution, some fanatics attacked and raided many of the Baháʼí homes in Marvdasht. They threatened and intimidated them and threw stones at their houses.

Therefore, Saberi's family left their house and went to Tehran to live with their relatives, and some, including one of Saberi's nieces, fled the country. But, after a month when they returned to Shiraz, their house was seized by the government.

== Arrest and prosecution ==
Saberi was arrested on October 24, 1982, by the Government agents of the Islamic Republic of Iran and transferred to Adel Abad Prison in Shiraz. She was kept in a two and a half meter prison cell with two cellmates. She repeatedly prayed and recited the talks of ʻAbdu'l-Bahá while she was in her cell, and every time her mother came to see and visit her in prison, she tried to show sympathy to her and advised her to be content with God's desire.

The charges against Saberi and the prosecution proceedings appear not to have been published. According to the representatives of the Baha'i community, the main reason of her arrest and trial were because she was a Baha'i, and Saberi faced sixteen charges, ranging from being Baháʼí to her participation in organising Baha'i community activities, to being unmarried and refusing to recant.

== Execution ==
On June 18, 1983, Saberi, along with 9 other Baha'i women, was hanged in Adel Abad Prison in Shiraz. She was 24 years old. Saberi's name is on the list of the 206 individuals reported by the Baha'i International Community in 1999.
