= Collège Mixte Philadelphie – Dantès Bellegarde =

Private school in Port-au-Prince, Haiti

Coordinates: 18°32′9.82″N 72°19′53.83″W

Information
- Funding type: Private school
- Established: 1958; 67 years ago
- Grades: 1-12

Collège Mixte Philadelphie – Dantès Bellegarde is a private school located north of the neighborhood of Turgeau, in Port-au-Prince, Haiti. The school was founded in 1958.

The school follows the Haitian Education System and offers lower to senior levels:

- elementary (1– 6 grades)
- middle (7–9 grades)
- high school ( 10 –12 grades)
