= Mona Foundation =

Non-profit organization focusing on the education of women and girls

- Named after: Mona Mahmudnizhad
- Formation: 1999
- Type: Charitable organization
- VAT ID no.: 23-2218331
- Purpose: To educate children and empower girls globally.
- Headquarters: Bellevue, Washington
- Website: www.monafoundation.org

Mona Foundation is a non-profit organization that supports grassroots initiatives focused on education and raising the status of women and girls in the US and abroad. They believe that universal education and gender equity are the cornerstones of the eradication of poverty, disease, and conflict.

Mona Foundation is named after Mona Mahmudnizhad, an Iranian high school student who was executed in 1983 for her religious beliefs, in the Baháʼí Faith, and teaching of children classes.

Founded in 1999, Mona Foundation supports grassroots initiatives that provide education to all children, increase opportunities for women and girls, and emphasize serve e to the community. The Mona Foundation believes the key to eliminating poverty and achieving positive and sustained community transformation lies in universal education and gender equality. Mona Foundation searches the world to identify partners who share these two priorities.

== Operations ==
Mona Foundation develops long-term relationships with locally operated organizations and provides multi-year funding (six years on average).

== Projects ==
=== ADCAM, Brazil ===
The Association for Cohesive Development of the Amazon (ADCAM) started in 1985 as a small orphanage with 30 kids. Today, it offers K-12, a technical college, vocational training, a family development center and rural education programs serving over 1,000 students, and 4,400 youth, families and elderly a day. Programs include:

- A K-12 school serving more than 1000 students
- The Family Development Institute serving at risk students from the ages of 7-17
- The Vocational School offering 16 vocational training tracks
- The SAT tutorial curriculum used at 16 river schools alongside Amazon River
- An after-school program for street children serving 400 students
- A program for the disadvantaged & vulnerable elderly
- A Youth Apprenticeship program to prepare youth ages 15–24 for employment
- A program to assist juvenile offenders

=== Anis Zunúzí School, Haiti ===
The Anis Zunúzí Baháʼí School, located in Port-au-Prince, Haiti, offers K-12 education to 421 students (as of 2019), of whom 60 percent are girls. Excellent academics, music and arts and a Youth Empowerment Program are available to all students. No corporal punishment is allowed at Zunuzi.

=== Georges Marcellus, Haiti ===
Georges Marcellus quadrupled in size after 75 percent of schools in Haiti were destroyed by the earthquake of 2010. Located in Guerot, a farming community where most residents work in the fields and incomes fluctuate based on crop yields, Georges Marcellus allows students to continue coming to school even if families fail to pay the fees.

=== Badi School, Panama ===
The indigenous native peoples of Panama suffer from the greatest extremes of poverty, malnutrition, illiteracy and higher levels of disease. Located in San Miguelito, Badi school serves a town of indigenous Embera and Kuna ethnic groups. Badi School started in 1993 as a kindergarten in the carport of a trailer home. The school is now a K-12 serving more than 396 students.

=== Barli Institute, India ===
Recognized by UNESCO as one of the top 100 education projects in developing countries, Barli educates and empowers marginalized young rural women to become leaders and agents of social change in their communities. Barli has graduated 7,800 girls from more than 780 villages, improving the lives of thousands in their communities. All of Barli's students are girls and women.

=== Badi Foundation, China ===
Since 2005, Badi Foundation’s capacity-building initiatives have attracted over 36,000 participants, mostly women and youth, in 13 rural and semi-rural regions of China. The projects engage participants in service with a focus on agriculture, environment, public health, nutrition, culture and economic development. More than 4,000 women and youth participate in Badi's various programs. In the Environmental Action Program, 100 percent of the 1,044 participants are female.

=== Mongolian Development Center, Mongolia ===
The Mongolian Development Center provides training for teachers and parents. Located in Ulaanbaatar, MDC provides kindergarten and training in six regions of Mongolia, serves more than 7,760 children and 1,308 teachers. Sixty percent of students are girls and the 370 teachers are all female.

=== Sunflower Mission, Vietnam ===
With the support of Mona, Sunflower Mission has built 144 classrooms and funded 14,000 scholarships for children in remote villages of Vietnam since 2002. These schools have made education possible for thousands of students. Considered one of the most prestigious scholarships given by any organization operating in Vietnam, the Engineering and Technology Scholarship is given to a student each year via Sunflower Mission.

=== TKP, United States ===
Teaching Kids Programming (TKP) trains middle school teachers so they can engage students in Java language using TKP courseware.

=== Rancho Sespe, United States ===
Rancho Sespe is a small village of agricultural families living near the town of Fillmore in Ventura County, CA. Since 2001, Full Circle Learning has helped students achieve academic excellence while building character strength, creativity and conflict resolution skills. Out of the 100 families participating, 45 percent of students are girls and 99 percent are Latin American.

=== Tarzana, United States ===
The Habits-of-Heart after-school program serves disadvantaged and new immigrant students at Tarzana Elementary School. The program is divided into learning units that focus on a "habit of heart." Habits include courtesy, understanding and dedication and help students enhance their writing, speaking, science, art and music capacities. 75 percent of students in this program are girls.

== See also ==
- Poverty in Haiti
- Education in Haiti
- List of schools in Haiti
- Humanitarian response by non-governmental organizations to the 2010 Haiti earthquake
