= List of colleges in Haiti =

This is a list of colleges in Haiti.

== Colleges ==
This is a list of colleges in Haiti.

- Collège Catts Pressoir
- Collège de Mazenod
- College Harry Brakeman
- Collège Marie-Anne
- Collège Mixte de l'Experience, in Marin (just north of the Port-au-Prince airport)
- Collège Mixte Philadelphie – Dantès Bellegarde
- Collège Notre-Dame
- Collège Roger Anglade
- College Saint-Louis de Bourdon
- Collège Suisse, Jacmel
- College Susan Schuenke
- Collège Universitaire Caraïbe
- École Saint Thomas d'Aquin, Port-au-Prince
- Collège Chrétien d'Haïti
- Institution Saint Louis de Gonzague
- Institution du Sacré Cœur
- Collège Frère Odile Joseph (FIC) aux Cayes, should in the list of college back there.
- Collège Saint Dominique Cayes Haiti
- Séminaire de Théologie Evangélique de Port-au-Prince (STEP)
