= Thomas Joseph Murphy =

American prelate

His Excellency, The Most Reverend Thomas Joseph Murphy
- Archbishop of Seattle
- See: Seattle
- Installed: August 21, 1991
- Term ended: June 26, 1997
- Predecessor: Raymond Hunthausen
- Successor: Alexander Joseph Brunett
- Other posts: Bishop of Great Falls-Billings (1978–1987); Coadjutor Archbishop of Seattle (1987–1991)

Orders
- Ordination: April 12, 1958 by Samuel Stritch
- Consecration: August 21, 1978 by Cornelius Michael Power

Personal details
- Born: October 3, 1932 Chicago, Illinois, US
- Died: June 26, 1997 (aged 64) Seattle, Washington, US
- Buried: St. James Cathedral; Seattle
- Denomination: Roman Catholic
- Education: Saint Mary of the Lake Seminary
- Motto: In Christo gaudium et spes (In Christ joy and hope)

Thomas Joseph Murphy (October 3, 1932 – June 26, 1997) was an American Catholic prelate who served as archbishop of Seattle in Washington State from 1991 until 1997. He previously served as bishop of Great Falls-Billings in Montana from 1978 to 1987 and as coadjutor archbishop of Seattle from 1987 to 1991.

== Biography ==
=== Early life ===
Born in Chicago, Illinois, on October 3, 1932, Thomas Murphy attended Saint Mary of the Lake Seminary in Mundelein, Illinois.

Murphy was ordained to the priesthood for the Archdiocese of Chicago at the Chapel of the Immaculate Conception at Saint Mary by Cardinal Samuel Stritch in 1958. On September 15, 1973, Cardinal John Cody appointed Murphy as rector of Saint Mary Seminary, a post he held until 1978.

=== Bishop of Great Falls-Billings ===
On July 5, 1978, Murphy was appointed bishop of Great Falls-Billings by Pope Paul VI; he was consecrated in Great Falls, Montana, by Archbishop Cornelius Power on August 21, 1978. In 1979, Murphy addressed the National Catholic Education Association on vocations to the priesthood and their on the importance for the local church.

=== Coadjutor Archbishop of Seattle ===
On May 26, 1987, Pope John Paul II appointed Murphy as coadjutor archbishop of Seattle, with immediate right of succession to Archbishop Raymond Hunthausen. Murphy's appointment came after a series of controversies surrounding Hunthausen, first prompted by an apostolic visitation to the archdiocese ordered by then Cardinal Joseph Ratzinger, prefect of the Congregation for the Doctrine of the Faith. Ratzinger was concerned about Hunthausen violating church doctrine. On December 3, 1985, the pope appointed Reverend Donald Wuerl as auxiliary bishop of Seattle, with authority to overrule Hunthausen in several important areas. After protests from Hunthausen and other American prelates, John Paul II removed Wuerl and appointed Murphy as a coadjutor archbishop with less immediate authority.

=== Archbishop of Seattle ===
Murphy automatically became archbishop of Seattle upon Hunthausen's retirement on August 21, 1991. As archbishop, Murphy traveled extensively to parishes around the archdiocese and was an advocate for the poor and disenfranchised. He oversaw an extensive renovation of St. James Cathedral in Seattle, which was completed in 1994. Under Murphy's administration the archdiocese saw an increase in registered Catholics, and an increase in outreach and ministries for women, various ethnic groups, and LGBTQ individuals.

In 1992, Murphy opened Elizabeth House in Seattle, which provided medical and job training for pregnant teens. For small Washington towns that were suffering from cutbacks in the timber industry, Murphy provided $500,000 to assisting starting small businesses. To help offset the declining numbers of priests, he provided financial support to a Seattle University program to train lay people in assist in some parish duties.

== Death and legacy ==
Murphy was diagnosed with acute myeloid leukemia in December 1996. He was undergoing chemotherapy when he suffered a cerebral hemorrhage. Thomas Murphy died at Providence Medical Center in Seattle on June 26, 1997. He is interred in the episcopal crypt beneath the main altar of St. James Cathedral.

In 1999, Holy Cross High School in Everett, Washington was renamed Archbishop Thomas J. Murphy High School in his honor. In 2000, a new organ in the apse of St. James Cathedral was named the Archbishop Thomas J. Murphy Millennium Organ. The "Archbishop Thomas J. Murphy Memorial Parish Stewardship Award" is named in his honor.

In 2006, the archdiocese dedicated the Archbishop Murphy Courtyard on the south side of the cathedral. It contains a fountain and pool, a marker stone and a statue of Mary, mother of Jesus.

Catholic Church titles
Preceded by Eldon Bernard Schuster	Bishop of Great Falls-Billings; 1978–1987	Succeeded by Anthony Michael Milone
Preceded by Raymond Hunthausen	Archbishop of Seattle; 1991–1997	Succeeded by Alexander Joseph Brunett
