= Eusebio L. Elizondo Almaguer =

Mexican American Catholic prelate (born 1954)

His Excellency, The Most Reverend Eusebio L. Elizondo Almaguer MSpS
- Auxiliary Bishop of Seattle
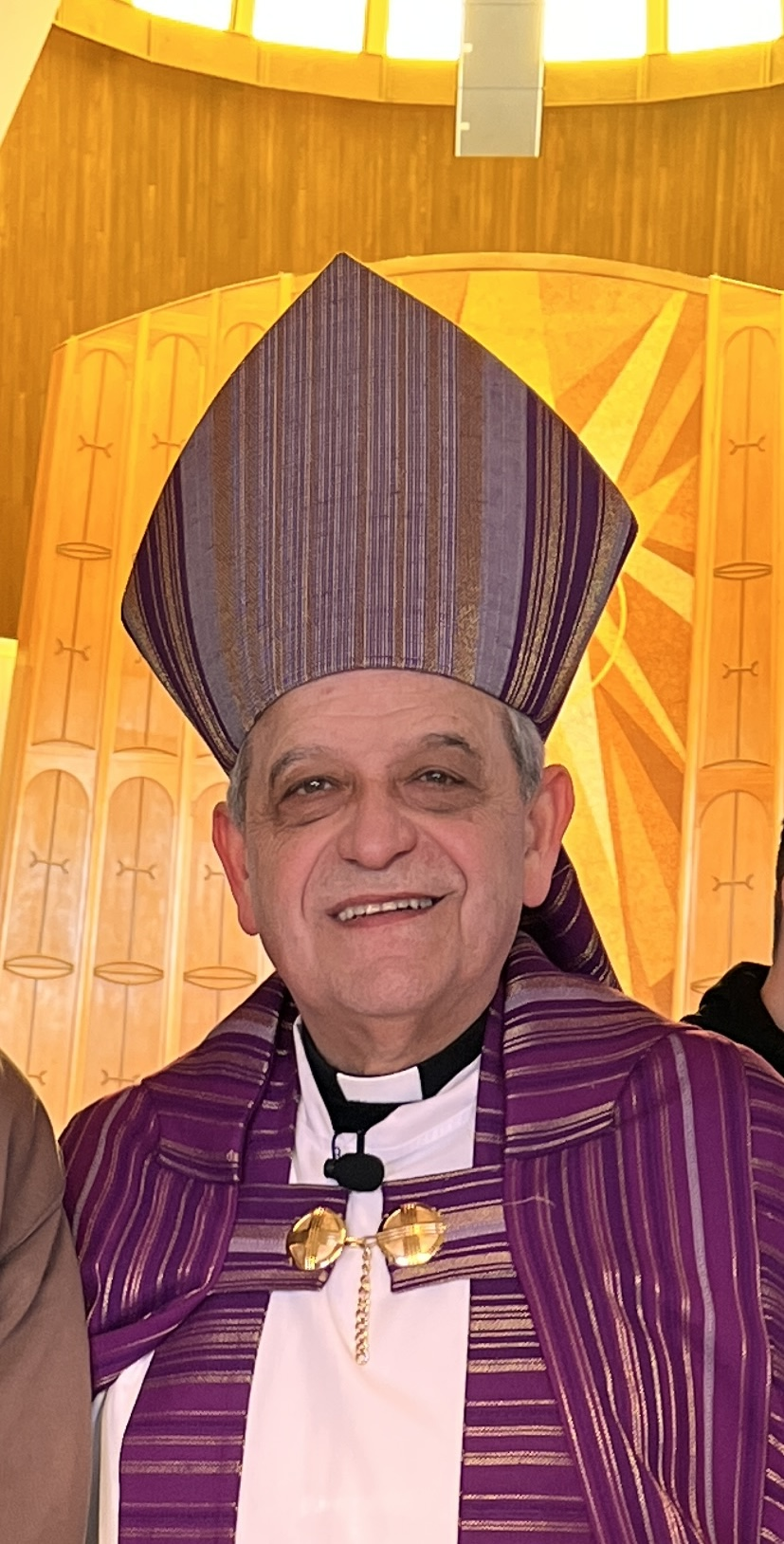
- Elizondo in 2026
- Church: Catholic
- Archdiocese: Seattle
- Appointed: May 12, 2005
- Installed: June 6, 2005
- Other post: Titular Bishop of Acholla

Orders
- Ordination: August 18, 1984 by Ricardo Watty Urquidi
- Consecration: June 6, 2005 by Alexander Joseph Brunett, George Leo Thomas, and Gustavo García-Siller

Personal details
- Born: August 3, 1954 (age 72) Victoria, Tamaulipas, Mexico
- Education: Pontifical Gregorian University (JCL)
- Motto: Amicus amicorum Jesu (Latin for 'Friend of the friends of Jesus')
- Styles
- Reference style: His Excellency; The Most Reverend
- Spoken style: Your Excellency
- Religious style: Bishop

Ordination history
History
Episcopal consecration
- Principal consecrator: Alexander Joseph Brunett
- Co-consecrators: George Leo Thomas Gustavo Garcia-Siller
- Source(s):"Eusebio L. Elizondo Almaguer". Catholic-Hierarchy.org. David M. Cheney.

Eusebio de la Luz Elizondo Almaguer (born August 3, 1954) is a Mexican American Catholic prelate serving as an auxiliary bishop of the Archdiocese of Seattle in Washington State since 2005.

== Biography ==
=== Early life ===
Elizondo was born on August 3, 1954, in Victoria, Tamaulipas, Mexico. He studied at the Pontifical Gregorian University in Rome, receiving a Bachelor of Arts degree in theology and a degree in canon law. He professed his vows to the Missionaries of the Holy Spirit in 1974.

=== Priesthood ===
Elizondo was ordained a priest of the Missionaries of the Holy Spirit at the Church of Santa Cruz del Pedregal, San Angel in Mexico City by Bishop Ricardo Watty Urquidi on August 18, 1984.

The Missionaries sent Elizondo in 2000 to the United States to serve at St. Elizabeth Ann Seton Parish in Bothell, Washington, a parish with a large Hispanic population.

=== Auxiliary Bishop of Seattle ===
Elizondo was appointed as an auxiliary bishop of Seattle and titular bishop of Acholla on May 12, 2005, by Pope Benedict XVI. Elizondo was consecrated at the St. James Cathedral in Seattle as the first Hispanic bishop in the archdiocese by Archbishop Alexander Brunett on June 6, 2005.

== See also ==
- Archdiocese of Seattle
- Catholic Church hierarchy
- Catholic Church in the United States
- Historical list of the Catholic bishops of the United States
- List of Catholic bishops of the United States
- Lists of patriarchs, archbishops, and bishops

== Episcopal succession ==
Catholic Church titles
Preceded by -	Auxiliary Bishop of Seattle; 2005–present	Succeeded by -
Preceded by Nestor Celestial Cariño	— TITULAR — Bishop of Acholla; 2005-present	Incumbent
