= Joseph Patrick Dougherty =

American prelate

His Excellency, The Most Reverend Joseph Patrick Dougherty
- Auxiliary Bishop of Los Angelese; Titular Bishop of Altinum
- Church: Roman Catholic Church
- See: Archdiocese of Los Angeles
- In office: February 5, 1969 to July 9, 1970
- Other posts: Diocese of Yakima; 1951 to 1959; Titular Bishop of Altinum; 1969 to 1970

Orders
- Ordination: June 14, 1930 by Edward John O'Dea
- Consecration: September 26, 1952 by Thomas Arthur Connolly

Personal details
- Born: January 11, 1905 Kansas City, Kansas, U.S.
- Died: July 9, 1970 (aged 65) Westport, Washington, US
- Education: University of Portland; St. Patrick Seminary
- Motto: Ministrare (To serve)

Joseph Patrick Dougherty (January 11, 1905 – July 9, 1970) was an American prelate of the Roman Catholic Church. He served as the first bishop of the Diocese of Yakima in Washington State from 1951 to 1969 and as an auxiliary bishop of the Archdiocese of Los Angeles in California from 1969 to 1970.

== Biography ==
=== Early life ===
Joseph Dougherty was born on January 11, 1905, in Kansas City, Kansas. He attended the University of Portland in Portland, Oregon and St. Patrick Seminary in Menlo Park, California.

=== Priesthood ===
Dougherty was ordained to the priesthood by Bishop Edward John O’Dea for the Diocese of Seattle on June 14, 1930. After his ordination, the diocese assigned him to the faculty of St. Edward Seminary in Kenmore, Washington. He left that position in 1934 to become vice-chancellor of the diocese. In 1942, Dougherty was appointed chancellor. He also served as a diocesan consultor and director of the archdiocesan Society for the Propagation of the Faith.

=== Bishop of Yakima ===
On July 9, 1951, Dougherty was appointed the first bishop of the newly erected Diocese of Yakima by Pope Pius XII. He received his episcopal consecration at St. James Cathedral in Seattle on September 26, 1951, from Archbishop Thomas Arthur Connolly, with Bishops Charles Daniel White and Hugh Aloysius Donohoe serving as co-consecrators. He attended all four sessions of the Second Vatican Council in Rome between 1962 and 1965.

=== Auxiliary Bishop of Los Angeles ===
On February 5, 1969, Pope Paul VI named Dougherty as an auxiliary bishop of Los Angeles and titular bishop of Altinum. Dougherty died in Westport, Washington, on July 9, 1970, at age 65. He is buried at Calvary Cemetery in Yakima, Washington.

Catholic Church titles
Preceded by none	Bishop of Yakima; 1951–1969	Succeeded by Cornelius Michael Power
