= Archdiocese of Seattle =

Latin Catholic ecclesiastical jurisdiction in Washington State, United States

Archdiocese of Seattle Archidiœcesis Seattlensis

Catholic
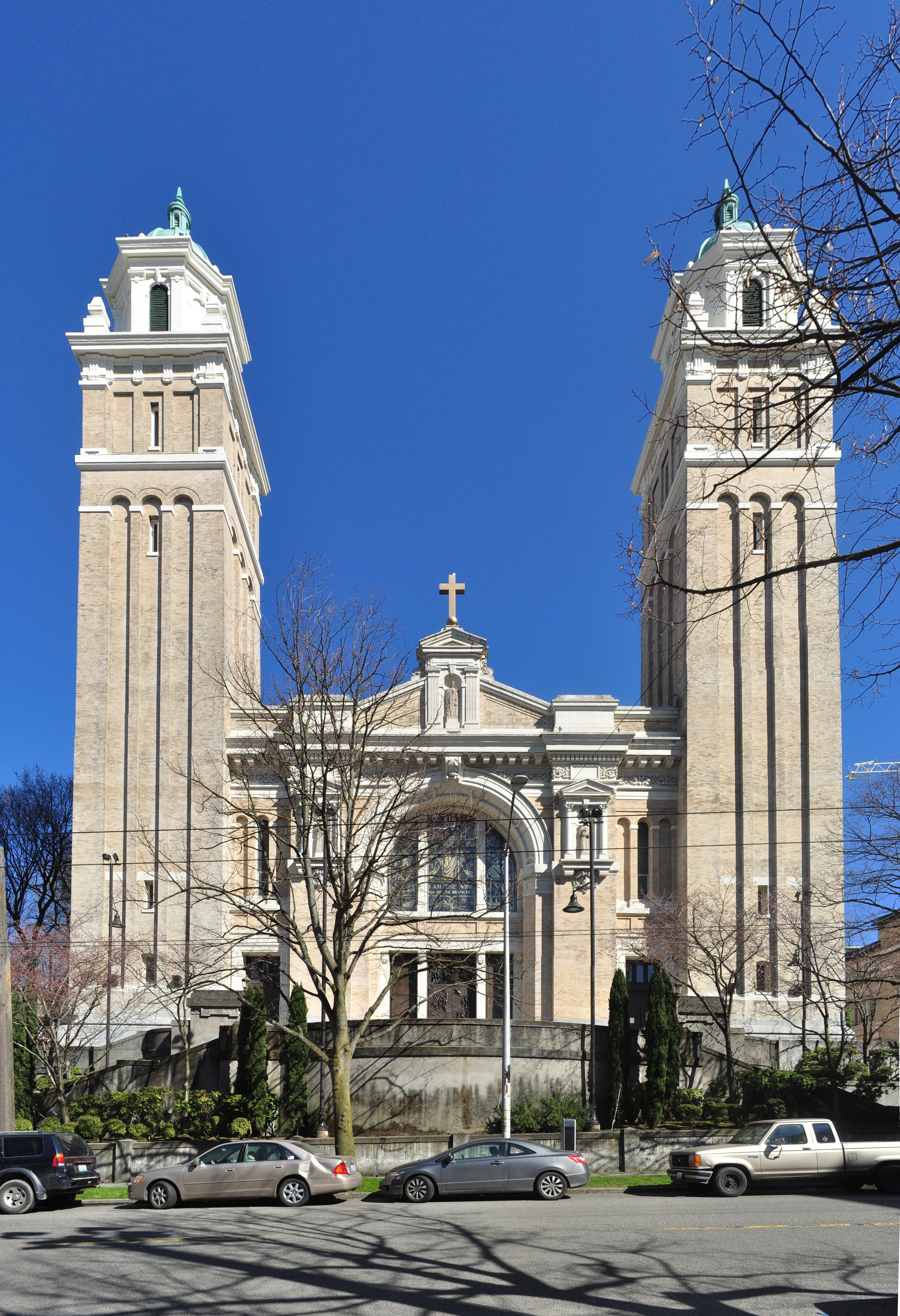
- St. James Cathedral, the mother church of the archdiocese

- Coat of arms

Location
- Country: United States
- Territory: Western Washington
- Episcopal conference: United States Conference of Catholic Bishops
- Ecclesiastical region: XII
- Ecclesiastical province: Seattle
- Coordinates: 47°36′23″N 122°19′32″W

Statistics
- Area: 64,269 km^{2} (24,814 sq mi) (Note: Annuario Pontificio (2024) via Catholic-Hierarchy.org)
- Population: Total; Catholics: (as of 2023); 6,053,656; 889,000 (14.7%)
- Parishes: 136
- Schools: 72

Information
- Denomination: Catholic
- Sui iuris church: Latin
- Rite: Roman
- Established: May 31, 1850; 176 years ago (as Diocese of Nesqually); September 11, 1907; 119 years ago (became Diocese of Seattle); June 23, 1951; 75 years ago (elevated to Archdiocese)
- Cathedral: St. James Cathedral
- Patron saint: James the Greater
- Secular priests: 187 diocesan; 79 religious; 114 deacons

Current leadership
- Pope: Leo XIV
- Archbishop: Paul D. Etienne
- Auxiliary Bishops: Eusebio L. Elizondo; Frank R. Schuster
- Vicar General: Very Rev. Gary F. Lazzeroni
- Judicial Vicar: Anthony Bawyn
- Bishops emeritus: J. Peter Sartain

Map
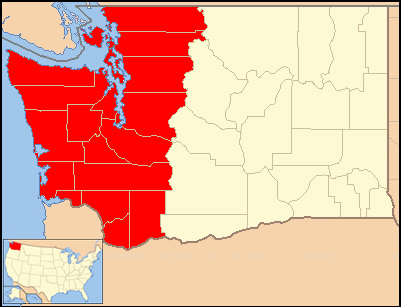

Website
- archseattle.org

The Archdiocese of Seattle (Latin: Archidiœcesis Seattlensis) is an archdiocese of the Catholic Church in western Washington State in the United States. The diocese was known as the Diocese of Nesqually from 1850 to 1907. The mother church is St. James Cathedral in Seattle. Its archbishop is Paul D. Etienne. The diocese was elevated to metropolitan archdiocesan status in 1951.

== Ecclesiastical province ==
The Archdiocese of Seattle encompasses 144 parishes west of the Cascade Range. It is the metropolitan archdiocese of two suffragan dioceses:

- Diocese of Spokane, with territory taken from the archdiocese in 1913
- Diocese of Yakima, with territory taken from the archdiocese in 1951

== Statistics ==
As of 2023, the archdiocese reported that it served approximately served 889,000 Catholics in 136 parishes with 187 diocesan priests, 79 religious priests, 114 permanent deacons, 87 male religious and 245 female religious.

== History ==
=== 1830 to 1850 ===
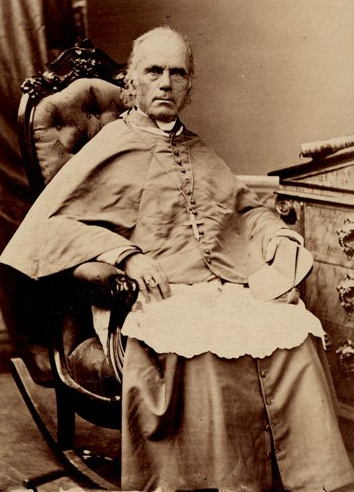
Bishop Blanchet (circa 1870)

The Catholic presence in what was then Oregon Country dates to the arrival in the 1830s of missionary priests François Blanchet and Modeste Demers from the British colony of Lower Canada.

In 1843, the Vatican established the Vicariate Apostolic of the Oregon Territory and named François Blanchet as its vicar apostolic. In 1846, Pope Gregory XVI divided the vicariate into three dioceses:

- Diocese of Oregon City in present-day Oregon
- Diocese of Vancouver Island in British Columbia
- Diocese of Walla Walla in Washington

That same year, Gregory XVI named Augustin-Magloire Blanchet, the brother of François Blanchet, as the bishop of Walla Walla. According to contemporary accounts, Augustin-Magloire Blanchet was unhappy to discover that Walla Walla was no more than a trading post. He immediately ran into conflict with the Oblate order priests in the diocese who were performing missionary work. They refused Blanchet's efforts to assign them to parishes. Blanchet also tried to claim an Oblate mission property for the diocese that the Oblates had received from a Native American tribe.

In November 1847, conflicts between Protestant missionaries and the Cayuse escalated into violence. Several tribesmen murdered ten Americans, including two Protestant missionaries, near Walla Walla in what was termed the Whitman massacre (Whitman was the leader of the missionaries). Despite attempts by the Cayuse tribe to defuse the conflict, American settlers raised militias to punish them for the killings. Local Protestants accused the Catholic clergy of being in league with the Cayuse. This animosity, the warfare between the U.S. Army and the Cayuse and the failure of the diocese to grow prompted the Vatican to move Blanchet to safety in St. Paul in the Willamette Valley of Oregon.

=== 1850 to 1903 ===
On May 31, 1850, Pope Pius IX officially suppressed the defunct Diocese of Walla Walla and erected the Diocese of Nesqually in its place. The pope appointed Augustin Blanchet as bishop of the new diocese. In January 1851, Blanchet dedicated St. James Church near Fort Vancouver as the cathedral for the diocese.

In 1868, Francis X. Prefontaine requested Blanchet's permission to build a church near Pioneer Square in Seattle to support the city's first Catholic parish, Our Lady of Good Help. Blanchet gave Prefontaine permission to build a church there, on the condition that Prefontaine raise all the money for it. Prefontaine in 1869 opened Seattle's first Catholic church.

After Blanchet retired in 1879, Egidius Junger succeeded him. The diocese experienced considerable growth under Junger's administration, including an increase in the number of priests and parishes and an increase in the number of nuns from 60 to 286. St. Leo the Great, established in 1879, was the first Catholic Church in Tacoma. Junger built a large cathedral in Vancouver in 1888. The $50,000 debt incurred by the project became a burden for the diocese.

In 1891, the Jesuits opened a parish school for boys at Immaculate Conception Parish. It became Seattle College in 1898. Today it is Seattle University. Our Lady of Hope, the first Catholic church in Everett, was dedicated in 1892. Junger died in 1895.

Edward O'Dea replaced Junger in 1896. When he took office, O'Dea was confronted with financial difficulties, including a $25,000 debt for the construction of the cathedral.

=== 1903 to 1951 ===
In 1903, O'Dea petitioned the Vatican to move the episcopal see from Vancouver to Seattle, due to the increased population and economy of Seattle. He began construction on a new cathedral in Seattle in 1905. In 1907, the Vatican suppressed the Diocese of Nesqually and erected the Diocese of Seattle, with O'Dea as its first bishop.He dedicated St. James Cathedral in Seattle that same year. In 1913, the Vatican erected the Diocese of Spokane, taking its territory from the Diocese of Seattle. O'Dea guided the diocese through World War I and the anti-Catholic sentiment engendered by Initiative 49, a Ku Klux Klan-sponsored effort in Washington State to outlaw parochial schools. His final accomplishment was the establishment of St. Edward Seminary in Kenmore in 1930. O'Dea died in 1932.

The second bishop of Seattle was Gerald Shaughnessy. Shaughnessy took office in 1933 kept the diocese financially stable during the Great Depression. He encouraged the formation of Serra International and served as its first chaplain. He also supported the St. Vincent de Paul Society and Catholic Charities chapters in the diocese. In 1948, Pope Pius XII appointed Auxiliary Bishop Thomas Connolly from the Archdiocese of San Francisco as coadjutor bishop to assist Shaughnessy, who had not fully recovered from a stroke three years earlier. When Shaughnessy died in 1950, Connolly automatically succeeded him as bishop of Seattle.

=== 1951 to 1991 ===
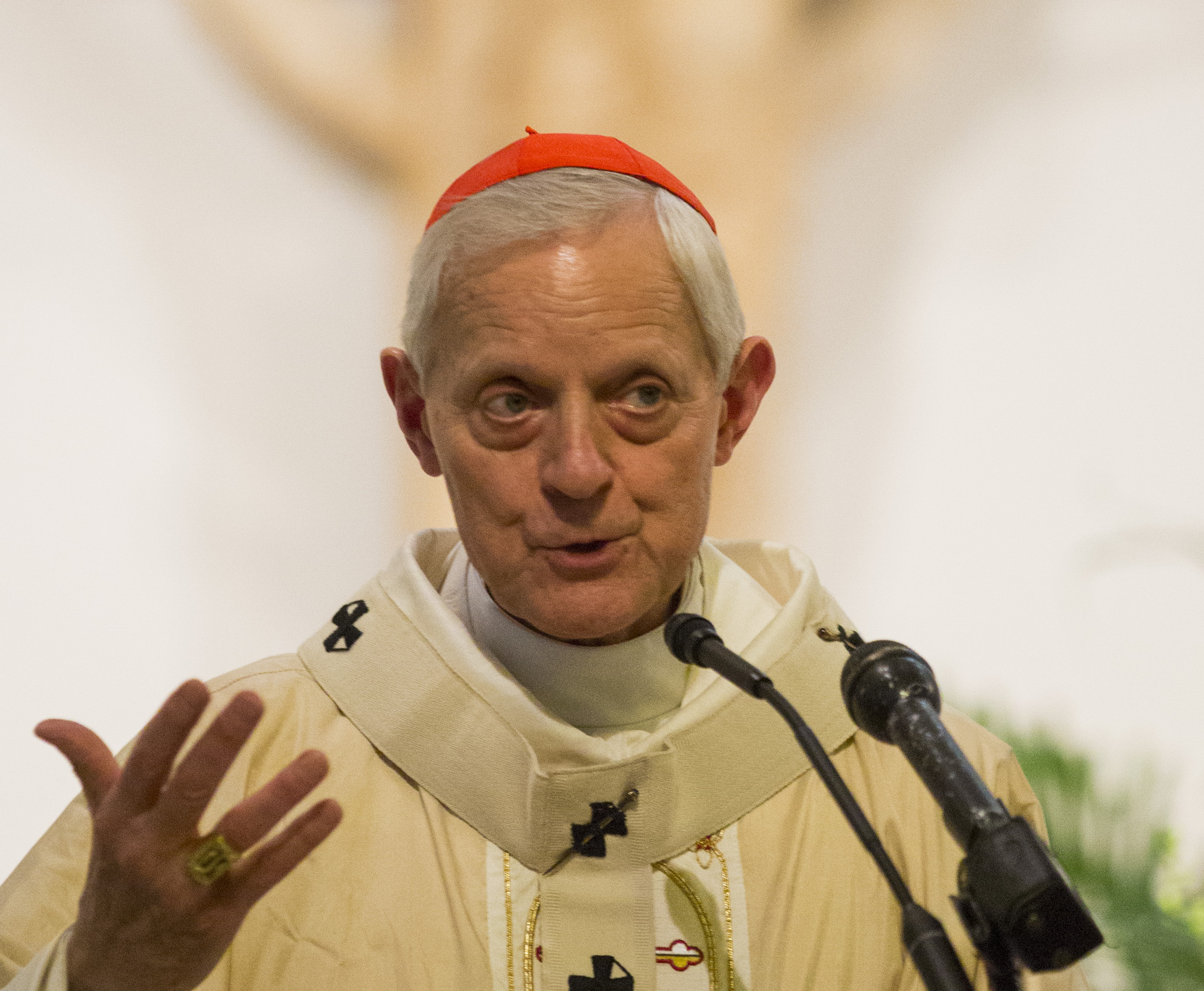
Cardinal Wuerl (2015)

Pius XII elevated the Diocese of Seattle to the Archdiocese of Seattle on June 23, 1951, while taking some of its territory to erect the Diocese of Yakima. The pope named Connolly as the first archbishop of Seattle. During his tenure, Connolly became known as a "brick and mortar bishop" for his construction of hundreds of Catholic facilities to accommodate the post-World War II population growth in the archdiocese. He renovated St. James Cathedral; established 43 new parishes; and supervised construction of over 350 churches, schools, rectories, convents, parish halls, and religious education centers. Connolly was an outspoken supporter of the American civil rights movement and ecumenism. When Connolly retired in 1975, Pope Paul VI appointed Bishop Raymond Hunthausen from the Diocese of Helena as his successor.

By 1983, the Vatican was allegedly receiving complaints that Hunthausen was deviating from Catholic doctrine on matters such as the providing of artificial contraception in Catholic hospitals and the church's policies on gay and divorced Catholics. Cardinal Joseph Ratzinger, prefect of the Congregation for the Doctrine of the Faith, investigated Hunthausen. Ratzinger appointed Archbishop James Hickey of the Diocese of Washington as apostolic visitor to conduct the investigation. After meeting with Hunthausen and examining archdiocesan policies, Hickey concluded that Hunthausen had exercised "weak doctrinal leadership" in a number of areas. These included allowing children to receive the sacrament of communion without first having received the sacrament of penance.

In response to Hickey's investigation, John Paul II named Donald Wuerl in January 1986 as an auxiliary bishop in Seattle. In May 1986, Hunthausen and Wuerl found themselves in opposition on proposed state legislation to prohibit discrimination on the basis of sexual orientation in employment. At that point, Hunthausen learned for the first time that Wuerl had been given authority over him on many issues. Hunthausen publicly revealed the Vatican's actions in September 1986, calling the arrangement unworkable. While some chancery officials expressed support for Wuerl, some questioned his role and saw little impact on the archdiocese a year after his appointment. In November 1986, Hunthausen took his grievances to the meeting of the US Conference of Catholic Bishops, which sided in his favor.

In February 1987, after appointing a commission to study the controversy in Seattle, John Paul II met with Hunthausen in Rome. In 1987, Bishop Thomas Murphy of the Diocese of Great Falls-Billings was made coadjutor archbishop in Seattle to assist Hunthausen. In March 1988, John Paul II named Wuerl as bishop of the Diocese of Pittsburgh. When Hunthausen retired in 1991, Murphy replaced him as archbishop of Seattle

=== 1991 to 2010 ===
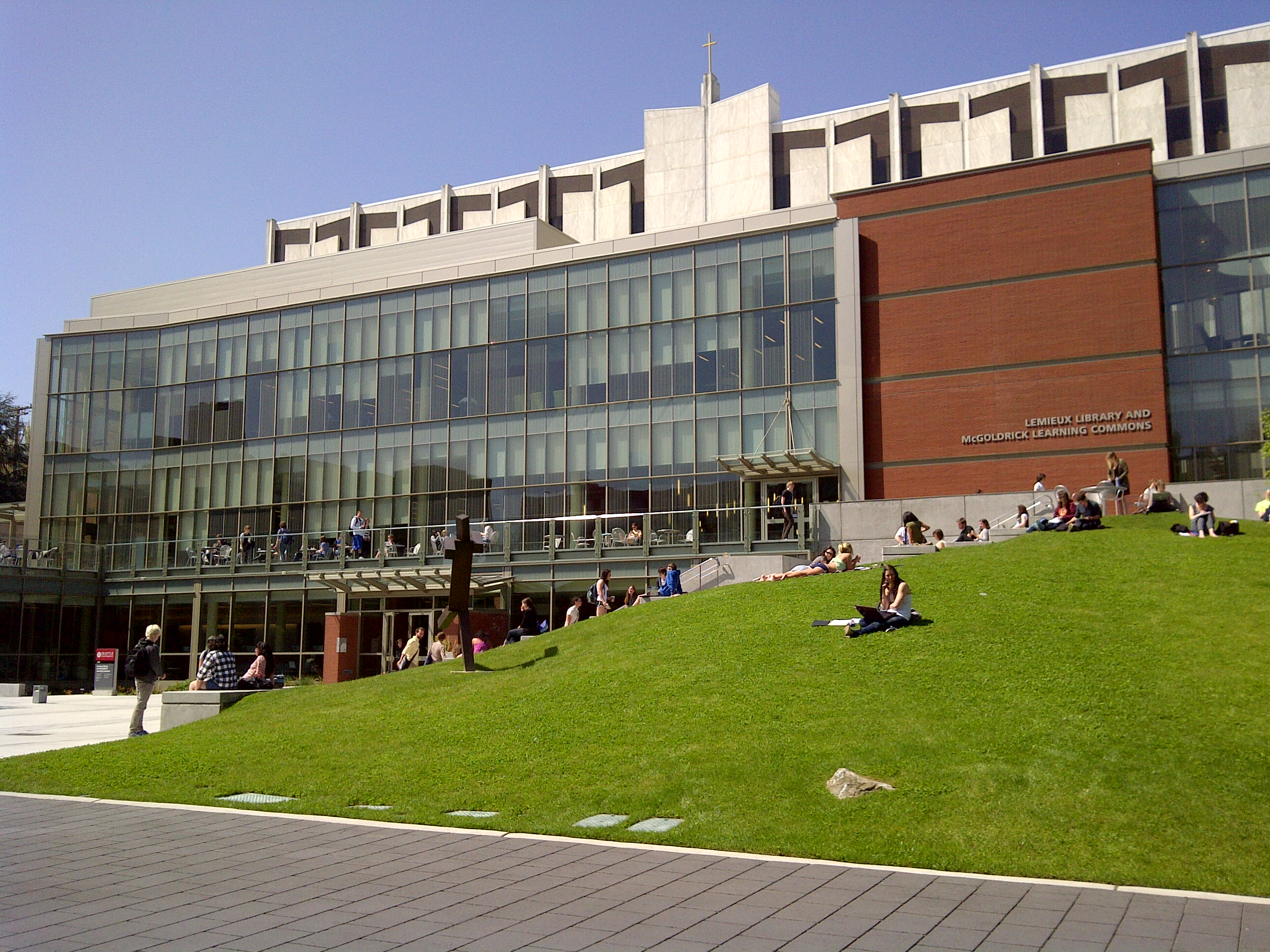
Seattle University (2004)

Murphy oversaw an extensive renovation of St. James Cathedral, completed in 1994. Under Murphy's administration the archdiocese saw an increase in registered Catholics, and an increase in outreach and ministries for women, various ethnic groups, and LGBT individuals.

In 1992, Murphy opened Elizabeth House in Seattle, which provided medical care and job training for pregnant teens. For small Washington towns that were suffering from cutbacks in the timber industry, Murphy provided $500,000 to assist in starting small businesses. To help offset the declining numbers of priests, he provided financial support to a Seattle University program to train lay people in assist in some parish duties. Murphy died in 1997.

To replace Murphy, John Paul II named Bishop Alexander Brunett of Helena as archbishop of Seattle in 1997. Despite the economic recession, annual contributions from Catholics in Western Washington doubled during Brunett's tenure as archbishop, providing funding for the construction of St. Elizabeth Ann Seton Catholic High School, which opened in 2009 in Vancouver and Pope John Paul II High School, which opened in 2010 in Lacey. Brunett also helped launch the Fulcrum Foundation, which provides scholarships to poor families to send their children to Catholic schools and oversaw the $7 million purchase, renovation and expansion of the Palisades Retreat Center in Federal Way. Brunett retired in 2009.

=== 2010 to present ===
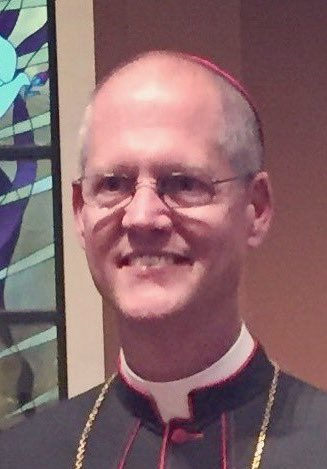
Bishop Etienne (2016)

The next archbishop of Seattle was Bishop J. Peter Sartain from the Diocese of Joliet, named by Pope Benedict XVI in 2010. In June 2019, Sartain installed Archbishop Paul D. Etienne of the Archdiocese of Anchorage as coadjutor archbishop to assist him. Sartain retired in September 2019. When Sartain retired, Etienne automatically became archbishop of Seattle. On taking office, Etienne announced that he would not reside in Connolly House, the mansion for the archbishop of Seattle, suggesting it be sold to provide money to help the poor.

In February 2024, the archdiocese announced a plan to consolidate its 136 parishes into 60 parish families. The consolidation is due to a declining number of priests in the archdiocese. While priests are on the decline, conversions to the Catholic faith in Western Washington have been on the rise in the mid-2020s. As of 2026, Etienne is the archbishop of Seattle.

=== Sex abuse ===
In May 1988, Paul Conn from Queen of Angels Parish in Port Angeles pleaded guilty to molesting six altar boys at the church. The priest was convicted and sentenced to four years in prison. Immediately removed from ministry after his arrest, Conn was laicized in 2005. In a letter read at mass in June 1988, Archbishop Hunthausen revealed the archdiocese had received allegations against McGreal for the previous 20 years and that he had been under treatment for the last ten. McGreal victimized at least 40 children.

The archdiocese in 2006 settled for over $1 million a lawsuit brought by two brothers who claimed to have been sexually molested by James Cornelius during the 1970s. Cornelius had been removed from public ministry in 2002 after the brothers made their accusations. Once the allegations became public, ten more individuals made allegations against Cornelius to the archdiocese. Cornelius was laicized in 2004.

In 2016, the archdiocese released a list of 77 priests, nuns and religious men with credible accusations of sexual abuse of minors. The archdiocese in 2018 paid a $7 million settlement to six men who had accused six priests, including Conn and McGreal, of sexually abusing them when they were minors during the 1970s and 1980s.

By August 2022, the archdiocese had settled five sexual abuse lawsuits over the previous six months. The total settlement amount was approximately $2.3 million for all five plaintiffs. One female plaintiff was abused by a school employee around 1980. One plaintiff was a victim of Conn, another was victimized during the 1970s by David Pearson, a volunteer at St. Joseph Parish in Issaquah.

== Coat of arms ==
Coat of arms of Archdiocese of Seattle
Escutcheon Argent, a pile from base throughout gules, and, over all, between three crosses bottonny-fitchy, two bars, all counterchanged Symbolism The arms have as a base the familial arms of George Washington, with red horizontal stripes and three red mullets. The pile represents Mount Rainier, and the mullets changed to crosses.

== Bishops ==
=== Bishops of Nesqually ===
1. Augustin-Magloire Blanchet (1850–1879)
2. Egidius Junger (1879–1895)
3. Edward John O'Dea (1896–1907), title changed to Bishop of Seattle

=== Bishops of Seattle ===
1. Edward John O'Dea (1907–1932)
2. Gerald Shaughnessy (1933–1950)
3. Thomas Arthur Connolly (1950–1951), elevated to archbishop

=== Archbishops of Seattle ===
No.	Term of office	Portrait	Name in English and Latin	Date and place of birth	Age at start / end	Notes
1	23 June 1951 - 25 February 1975		Thomas Arthur Connolly · Thomas Arthurus Connolly	5 October 1899; San Francisco, California	51 / 75	Coadjutor bishop of Seattle from 1948. Succeeded as bishop in 1950 and became the first archbishop of Seattle in 1951.
2	25 February 1975 - 21 August 1991		Raymond Gerhardt Hunthausen · Raimundus G. Hunthausen	21 August 1921; Anaconda, Montana	53 / 70	Previously Bishop of Helena.
3	21 August 1991 - 26 June 1997		Thomas Joseph Murphy · Thomas Iosephus Murphy	3 October 1932; Chicago, Illinois	58 / 64	Coadjutor archbishop of Seattle from 1987 until Hunthausen's retirement in 1991. Died in office.
4	28 October 1997 - 16 September 2010		Alexander Joseph Brunett · Alexander Iosephus Brunett	17 January 1934; Detroit, Michigan	63 / 76	Previously Bishop of Helena.
5	16 September 2010 - 3 September 2019	Archbishop J. Peter Sartain	James Peter Sartain · Iacobus Petrus Sartain	6 June 1952; Memphis, Tennessee	58 / 67	Previously Bishop of Little Rock and Bishop of Joliet.
6	3 September 2019 - present		Paul Dennis Etienne · Paulus D. Etienne	15 June 1959; Tell City, Indiana	60 /	Previously Bishop of Cheyenne and Archbishop of Anchorage. Appointed coadjutor archbishop of Seattle on 29 April 2019 and succeeded Sartain on his retirement.

=== Auxiliary bishops of Seattle ===
No.	Term of office	Portrait	Name in English and Latin	Date and place of birth	Age at start / end	Notes
1	11 April 1956 - 11 November 1973		Thomas E. Gill	18 March 1908; Seattle, Washington	48 / 65	Died in office.
2	10 August 1976 - 6 September 1983		Nicolas E. Walsh	20 October 1916; Burnsville, Minnesota	59 / 66	Previously Bishop of Yakima. Retired in 1983.
3	3 December 1985 - 12 February 1988	Donald Wuerl in 2015	Donald Wuerl	12 November 1940; Pittsburgh, Pennsylvania	45 / 47	Appointed Bishop of Pittsburgh in 1988 and Archbishop of Washington in 2006. Created a cardinal in 2010.
4	19 November 1999 - 23 March 2004	Donald Wuerl in 2015	George Leo Thomas	19 May 1950; Anaconda, Montana	49 / 53	Appointed Bishop of Helena. Later became the first Archbishop of Las Vegas.
5	12 May 2005 - 12 April 2011		Joseph J. Tyson · Iosephus J. Tyson	16 October 1957; Moses Lake, Washington	47 / 53	Appointed Bishop of Yakima.
6	12 May 2005 - present		Eusebio Elizondo · Eusebius Elizondo	8 August 1954; Ciudad Victoria, Tamaulipas, Mexico	50 /	Member of the Missionaries of the Holy Spirit.
7	6 April 2017 - 20 July 2021		Daniel Mueggenborg	15 April 1962; Okarche, Oklahoma	54 / 59	Appointed Bishop of Reno.
8	8 March 2022 - present		Frank R. Schuster	20 May 1971; Mount Vernon, Washington	50 /	

=== Other diocesan priests who became bishops ===
- Robert John Armstrong, appointed Bishop of Sacramento in 1929
- Jean-Baptiste Brondel, appointed Bishop of Vancouver Island in 1879
- Joseph Patrick Dougherty, appointed Bishop of Yakima in 1951
- Cornelius Michael Power, appointed Bishop of Yakima in 1969

== Education ==
As of 2025, the Archdiocese of Seattle had 72 schools, serving over 19,800 students. The diocese also has two universities.

=== High schools ===
- Archbishop Murphy High School* – Everett
- Bellarmine Preparatory School* – Tacoma
- Bishop Blanchet High School – Seattle
- Cristo Rey Jesuit Seattle High School* – Seattle
- Eastside Catholic School * – Sammamish
- Forest Ridge School of the Sacred Heart* – Bellevue
- Holy Names Academy* –Seattle
- Kennedy High School – Burien
- O'Dea High School – Seattle
- Pope John Paul II High School* – Lacey
- Seattle's Jesuit College Preparatory School* – Seattle
- Seton Catholic College Prep* – Vancouver

* Operationally independent of archdiocese

== Sources and external links ==
- Official website
- GCatholic - Seattle see, with Google map and satellite photo - data for most sections
- Northwest Catholic - diocesan magazine
- St. James Cathedral
