= St. James ESL =

St. James ESL (English as a Second Language) Program, est. 1975, is a community-based volunteer literacy organization in Seattle, Washington, United States. St. James ESL provides free ESL (English as a Second Language) instruction and naturalization assistance to low-income adult immigrants and refugees in King County. This community outreach service of St. James Cathedral is non-sectarian: there are no requirements regarding religious affiliation for staff, volunteers, or students.

When former state governor, Dan Evans, invited South Vietnamese refugees to settle in Washington State after the fall of Saigon, many Seattle area agencies helped to integrate these refugees into the community. On July 16, 1975, Sister Terence Maureen Reilly of the Sisters of the Holy Names at St. James Cathedral, a member of the Literacy Council of Seattle, established a tutoring program for adult refugees. Trained volunteers provided tutoring at the Immaculate Heart high school and other locations in Seattle and surrounding areas.

Today, St. James ESL operates from an office in the Pastoral Outreach Center at 907 Columbia, across the street from the Cathedral. The Outreach Center building, originally the convent for the Sisters of the Holy Names, was remodeled in 2005 to accommodate St. James Cathedral outreach services.
