= Frank R. Schuster =

American priest and bishop

The Most Reverend Frank R. Schuster
- Auxiliary Bishop of Seattle
- See: Archdiocese of Seattle
- Appointed: March 8, 2022
- Installed: May 3, 2022
- Predecessor: Daniel Mueggenborg
- Other post: Titular Bishop of Hirina

Orders
- Ordination: June 12, 1999 by Alexander Joseph Brunett
- Consecration: May 3, 2022 by Paul D. Etienne, J. Peter Sartain, Joseph J. Tyson

Personal details
- Born: May 20, 1971 (age 55) Mount Vernon, Washington, US
- Education: University of Washington; Mundelein Seminary
- Motto: Iesus lux vitae (Jesus, the light of life)

Styles of Frank Raymond Schuster
- Reference style: His Excellency; The Most Reverend
- Spoken style: Your Excellency
- Religious style: Bishop

Frank Raymond Schuster (born May 20, 1971) is an American priest of the Catholic Church who has been serving as an auxiliary bishop for the Archdiocese of Seattle in Washington State since 2022.

== Biography ==
Frank Schuster was born on May 20, 1971, in Mount Vernon, Washington, to John and Virginia Schuster. He has two siblings. Frank Schuster grew up in Maple Valley, Washington, and attended Kennedy Catholic High School in Burien, Washington.

After finishing high school, Schuster enrolled in the University of Washington in Seattle, earning a Bachelor of Arts degree in psychology in 1994. Deciding to become a priest, he moved to Mundelein, Illinois, to enter the Mundelein Seminary. He received a Master of Divinity degree and a Bachelor of Sacred Theology degree from Mundelein.

=== Priesthood ===
On June 12, 1999, Schuster was ordained to the priesthood for the Archdiocese of Seattle at St. James Cathedral in Seattle by Archbishop Alexander Brunett.

After his 1999 ordination, the archdiocese assigned Schuster as parochial vicar at both Church of the Assumption Parish and Sacred Heart Parish, both in Bellingham, Washington. Schuster in 2000 left both parishes to become chaplain at Catholic Campus Ministry at Western Washington University in Bellingham. Schuster was named pastor of Assumption Parish in 2003 and named dean of the archdiocesan presbyteral council in 2004. He also assumed the role of pastor at Sacred Heart Parish in 2006.

Schuster was moved from Bellingham in 2007 to Woodinville, Washington, to be pastor of Saint Teresa of Calcutta Parish. He would remain at Saint Teresa for the next 14 years. In 2021, he was moved to Saint Vincent de Paul Parish in Federal Way, Washington.

=== Auxiliary Bishop of Seattle ===
Pope Francis appointed Schuster as an auxiliary bishop of Seattle on March 8, 2022. On May 3, 2022, Schuster was consecrated as a bishop at St. James Cathedral by Archbishop Paul D. Etienne, with Archbishop J. Peter Sartain and Bishop Joseph J. Tyson acting as co-consecrators.

Schuster serves as regional bishop in charge of the Southern Deaneries of the archdiocese.

== See also ==
- Catholic Church hierarchy
- Catholic Church in the United States
- Historical list of the Catholic bishops of the United States
- List of Catholic bishops of the United States
- Lists of patriarchs, archbishops, and bishops

== Episcopal succession ==
Catholic Church titles
Preceded by -	Auxiliary Bishop of Seattle; 2022-Present	Succeeded by -
