= Cornelius Michael Power =

Roman Catholic archbishop

His Excellency, The Most Reverend Cornelius Michael Power
- Archbishop of Portland
- See: Archdiocese of Portland
- Appointed: January 15, 1974
- Installed: April 17, 1974
- Retired: July 1, 1986
- Predecessor: Robert Joseph Dwyer
- Successor: William Levada
- Other post: Bishop of Yakima (1969–1974)

Orders
- Ordination: June 3, 1939 by Gerald Shaughnessy
- Consecration: May 1, 1969 by Thomas Arthur Connolly, Thomas Edward Gill, and Joseph Patrick Dougherty

Personal details
- Born: December 18, 1913 Seattle, Washington, U.S.
- Died: May 22, 1997 (aged 83) Portland, Oregon, U.S.
- Education: Saint Edward Seminary; Saint Patrick's Seminary and University
- Motto: Servite Domino In Laetitia; English: I will serve God cheerfully.

Styles of Cornelius Michael Power
- Reference style: His Excellency; The Most Reverend
- Spoken style: Your Excellency
- Religious style: Archbishop

Cornelius Michael Power (December 18, 1913 – May 22, 1997) was an American prelate of the Roman Catholic Church. He served as archbishop of the Archdiocese of Portland in Oregon from 1974 to 1986. He previously served as bishop of the Diocese of Yakima in Washington State from 1969 until 1974.

== Biography ==
=== Early life ===
Cornelius Power was born on December 18, 1913, to Irish immigrants William and Katherine (Kate) (née Dougherty) Power in Seattle, Washington. He had five siblings. After receiving a public education in the Beacon Hill section of Seattle from 1919 to 1923, Power attended St. Mary Parochial School. Power started in 1927 at O'Dea High School in Seattle.

In 1928, after a year at O'Dea, Power entered St. Joseph College in Mountain View, California. He then went in 1933 to Saint Patrick Seminary in Menlo Park, California. In 1935, he entered Saint Edward Seminary in Kenmore, Washington, finishing his preparation for the priesthood in 1939.

=== Priesthood ===
Power was ordained to the priesthood in Seattle for the Diocese of Seattle by Bishop Gerald Shaughnessy on June 3, 1939. After his ordination, Power served as assistant pastor at St. James Cathedral Parish. He travelled to Washington D.C. in 1940 to study canon law at the Catholic University of America. Power returned to Seattle in 1943 to be appointed chaplain of Holy Names Academy in that city. He was transferred in 1953 to be chaplain of St. James Cathedral.

In 1955, Power left St. James to serve as administrator of Our Lady of the Lake Parish in Seattle, rising to become its pastor in 1956. He remained at Our Lady of the Lake for the next thirteen years, while concurrently holding several positions in the archdiocesan curia. Power was elevated by the Vatican to the rank of domestic prelate of his holiness on January 12, 1963.

=== Bishop of Yakima ===
On February 5, 1969, Power was appointed the second bishop of Yakima by Pope Paul VI. He received his episcopal consecration at St. James Cathedral on May 1, 1969, from Archbishop Thomas Connolly, with Bishops Thomas Gill and Joseph Dougherty serving as co-consecrators. Power assumed as his episcopal motto: Servite Domino In Laetitia, meaning, "I will serve God cheerfully."

=== Archbishop of Portland ===
Paul VI appointed Power as archbishop of Portland in Oregon on January 15, 1974; he was installed on April 17, 1974, in the Cathedral of the Immaculate Conception in Portland.

During his tenure in Portland, Power formed a five-year plan for the archdiocese and created an endowment fund. Power founded the Oregon Catholic Conference and held the first clergy and archdiocesan conventions. He reorganized the local curia, Catholic Charities, and reestablished Catholic Truth Society of Oregon as the Oregon Catholic Press. He also encouraged ministries to Spanish-speaking and Southeast Asian residents.

=== Retirement and legacy ===
Pope John Paul II accepted Power's resignation as archbishop of Portland in Oregon on July 1, 1986; he spent his retirement in providing retreats and assistance to parishes.Cornelius Power died of pneumonia in Portland on May 22, 1997, at age 83. He is buried at Mount Calvary Cemetery.

Catholic Church titles
Preceded by Joseph Patrick Dougherty	Bishop of Yakima; 1969–1974	Succeeded by Nicolas Eugene Walsh
Preceded by Robert Joseph Dwyer	Archbishop of Portland; 1974–1986	Succeeded by William Joseph Levada
