= Thomas Arthur Connolly =

American prelate

His Excellency, The Most Reverend Thomas Arthur Connolly
- Archbishop of Seattle; Titular Bishop of Sila
- See: Archdiocese of Seattle
- Installed: May 18, 1950 as bishop of Seattle; June 23, 1951 as archbishop of Seattle
- Term ended: February 13, 1975
- Predecessor: Gerald Shaughnessy
- Successor: Raymond Hunthausen
- Other posts: Auxiliary Bishop of San Francisco (1939–1948); Coadjutor Bishop of Seattle (1948–1950); Titular Bishop of Sila (1939 - 1975)

Orders
- Ordination: June 11, 1926 by Edward Joseph Hanna
- Consecration: August 24, 1939 by John Joseph Mitty

Personal details
- Born: October 5, 1899 San Francisco, California, US
- Died: April 18, 1991 (aged 91) Seattle, Washington, US
- Residence: Connolly House; First Hill, Seattle
- Education: Saint Patrick's Seminary and University; Catholic University of America
- Motto: Justitia et pax (Justice and peace)

Ordination history of Thomas Arthur Connolly
History
Episcopal consecration
- Consecrated by: John Joseph Mitty
Episcopal succession
Bishops consecrated by Thomas Arthur Connolly as principal consecrator
- Joseph Patrick Dougherty: September 26, 1951
- Thomas Edward Gill: May 31, 1956
- Cornelius Michael Power: May 1, 1969

Thomas Arthur Connolly (October 5, 1899 – April 18, 1991) was an American Catholic prelate who served as the fifth bishop and first archbishop of Seattle in Washington State from 1950 to 1975. He previously served as an auxiliary bishop of the Archdiocese of San Francisco in California from 1939 to 1950.

Connolly supported the American civil rights movement, ecumenical programs, and labor rights issues. He also attended the Second Vatican Council in Rome.

== Biography ==
=== Early life ===
Thomas Connolly was born on October 5, 1899, in San Francisco, California, to Thomas and Catherine (née Gilsenan) Connolly. He studied at St. Patrick Seminary in Menlo Park, California.

=== Priesthood ===
Connolly was ordained to the priesthood by Archbishop Edward Hanna for the Archdiocese of San Francisco on June 11, 1926. After his ordination, the archdiocese assigned Connolly as a curate at St. Rose Parish in Santa Rosa, California, and St. Mary Star of the Sea Parish in Sausalito, California. In 1930, Connolly was sent to Washington, D.C., to attend the Catholic University of America, obtaining a Doctor of Canon Law degree in 1932.

After his return to California, Hanna named Connolly as his secretary in 1934 and as chancellor of the archdiocese in 1935. He was named a domestic prelate by Pope Pius XI in 1936, and pastor of Mission San Francisco de Asís in San Francisco by the archdiocese in 1939.

=== Auxiliary Bishop of San Francisco ===
On June 10, 1939, Connolly was appointed as an auxiliary bishop of San Francisco and titular bishop of Sila by Pope Pius XII. He received his episcopal consecration on August 24, 1939, from Archbishop John Mitty, with Bishops Robert Armstrong and Thomas Gorman serving as co-consecrators.

In 1941, After the American entry into World War II, Connolly was named vicar delegate to the Catholic chaplains serving the US Army and the US Navy along the Pacific Coast of the United States.

=== Coadjutor Bishop, Bishop and Archbishop of Seattle ===
Connolly was named coadjutor bishop of Seattle by Pius XII on February 28, 1948, with immediate right of succession to Bishop Gerald Shaughnessy, who had been in failing health for several years. Upon Shaughnessy's death on May 18, 1950, Connolly automatically became the fifth bishop of Seattle. When the Vatican elevated the diocese to an archdiocese on June 23, 1951, Connolly became its first archbishop.

During his tenure, Connolly became known as a "brick and mortar bishop" for his construction of hundreds of Catholic facilities to accommodate the post World War II population growth in the archdiocese. He renovated St. James Cathedral; established 43 new parishes; and built over 350 churches, schools, rectories, convents, parish halls and religious education centers. The Vatican named Connolly as assistant at the pontifical throne in 1959. Connolly attended all four sessions of the Second Vatican Council in Rome between 1962 and 1965. He was an outspoken supporter of the American civil rights movement, ecumenism, and anti-abortion rights issues.

=== Retirement ===
On February 13, 1975, Pope Paul VI accepted Connolly's resignation as archbishop of Seattle. Thomas Connolly died on April 18, 1991, in Seattle.

Catholic Church titles
Preceded by Gerald Shaughnessy	Archbishop of Seattle; 1950—1975	Succeeded by Raymond Hunthausen
