= Gerald Shaughnessy =

American prelate

His Excellency, the Most Reverend Gerald Shaughnessy S.M.
- Bishop of Seattle
- See: Diocese of Seattle
- Installed: September 19, 1933
- Term ended: May 18, 1950
- Predecessor: Edward John O'Dea
- Successor: Thomas Arthur Connolly

Orders
- Ordination: June 20, 1920 by Giovanni Bonzano
- Consecration: September 19, 1933 by Amleto Giovanni Cicognani

Personal details
- Born: May 19, 1887 Everett, Massachusetts, U.S.
- Died: May 18, 1950 (aged 62) Seattle, Washington, U.S.
- Buried: Holyrood Catholic Cemetery, Shoreline, Washington
- Denomination: Roman Catholic
- Education: Catholic University of America; Marist College; Boston College

Styles of Gerald Shaughnessy
- Reference style: The Most Reverend
- Spoken style: Your Excellency
- Religious style: Monsignor

Gerald Shaughnessy, SM (May 19, 1887 – May 18, 1950) was an American prelate of the Roman Catholic Church. He served as bishop of the Diocese of Seattle in Washington State from 1933 until his death in 1950. He was a member of the Society of Mary (Marists).

== Biography ==
=== Early life ===
Gerald Shaughnessy was born on May 19, 1887, in Everett, Massachusetts, to Joseph and Margarett (née Colwell) Shaughnessy. In 1909 he graduated from Boston College in Boston, Massachusetts, where he had won the Cronin scholarship. He then taught at private and public schools in Maryland, Montana and Utah. In 1916, Shaughnessy entered the Society of Mary. He studied theology at Marist College and the Catholic University of America in Washington, D.C., earning a Bachelor of Sacred Theology degree in 1920.

=== Priesthood ===
Shaughnessy was ordained to the priesthood for the Marists by Cardinal Giovanni Vincenzo Bonzano in Washington on June 20, 1920. He became an official of the apostolic delegation in 1919. Returning to the Marist College, he served as professor of moral theology from 1920 to 1933. During this period, Shaughnessy was also a professor at Notre Dame Seminary from 1923 to 1924 and spent time teaching at Marist facilities in Rome and Lyon, France (1930–1931). Shaughnessy became the novice master at the Marist College in 1932.

=== Bishop of Seattle ===
On July 1, 1933, Shaughnessy was appointed the fourth bishop of Seattle by Pope Pius XI. He received his episcopal consecration at the National Shrine of the Immaculate Conception in Washington, D.C. on September 19, 1933 from Archbishop Amleto Giovanni Cicognani, with Bishops Michael Joseph Keyes and Charles Daniel White serving as co-consecrators.

Shaughnessy kept the diocese financially stable during the Great Depression of the 1930s. He encouraged the formation of Serra International and served as its first chaplain. He also supported the Society of Saint Vincent de Paul and Catholic Charities chapters in the diocese. In November 1945, Shaughnessy suffered a cerebral hemorrhage while returning from the annual bishops meeting in Washington, D.C.In 1948, Pope Pius XII appointed Bishop Thomas Connolly as coadjutor bishop to assist Shaughnessy, who had not fully recovered from his stroke.

=== Death and legacy ===
Gerald Shaughnessy died in his home in the First Hill district of Seattle on May 18, 1950. Due to construction at St. James Cathedral in Seattle, the funeral was held at Immaculate Conception Church; it was celebrated by Archbishop Edward Howard.

== Viewpoints ==
=== Politics ===
In a 1941 Easter sermon, Shaughnessy criticized Republican presidential candidate Wendell Willkie for a remark that Willkie later dismissed as "campaign oratory". During the 1940 US presidential campaign, Willkie had claimed that if re-elected, President Franklin Roosevelt would push the nation into World War II by April 1941. Willkie later downplayed this statement. After Willkie demanded an apology from Shaughnessy, he declared that Willkie was not;

"...the man he used to be, and in fact he never was ... And speaking of 'apology,' Mr. Willkie, I believe that you owe one to your party, to those who voted for you and to the whole nation."

=== War ===
During World War II, Shaughnessy condemned discrimination against Japanese-Americans and opposed American participation in warfare abroad.

Catholic Church titles
Preceded by Edward John O'Dea	Bishop of Seattle; 1933–1950	Succeeded by Thomas Arthur Connolly
