= Acholla =

Archaeological site in Tunisia

- Location within Tunisia
- 35°04′42″N 11°01′07″E
- Type: Settlement
- Location: Sfax Governorate, Tunisia

Acholla (Ancient Greek: Ἄχολλα, Akholla) also latinised as Achilla or Achulla, was a Roman-Punic city on the sea-coast in the ancient province of Africa Propria (Byzacena) in modern Tunisia. It was located little above the northern extremity of the Lesser Syrtis, and about 20 Greek miles south of Thapsus. It was a colony from the island of Melita (Malta), the people of which were colonists from Carthage. Under the Romans, it was a free city. In the African War, 46 BCE, it submitted to Julius Caesar, for whom it was held by Messius; and it was in vain besieged by the Pompeian commander Considius.

Its location is identified as at Ras Botria (Henchir Botria). Among its ruins, of a late style, but very extensive, there has been found an interesting bilingual inscription, in Phoenician and Latin, in which the name is spelt Achulla. The name appears as Anolla in the Tabula Peutingeriana.

The city was also the seat of an ancient Christian diocese, which survives today as a titular bishopric of the Roman Catholic Church. The current bishop is Eusebio L. Elizondo Almaguer of the United States.
