= Proto-Cathedral of St. James the Greater =

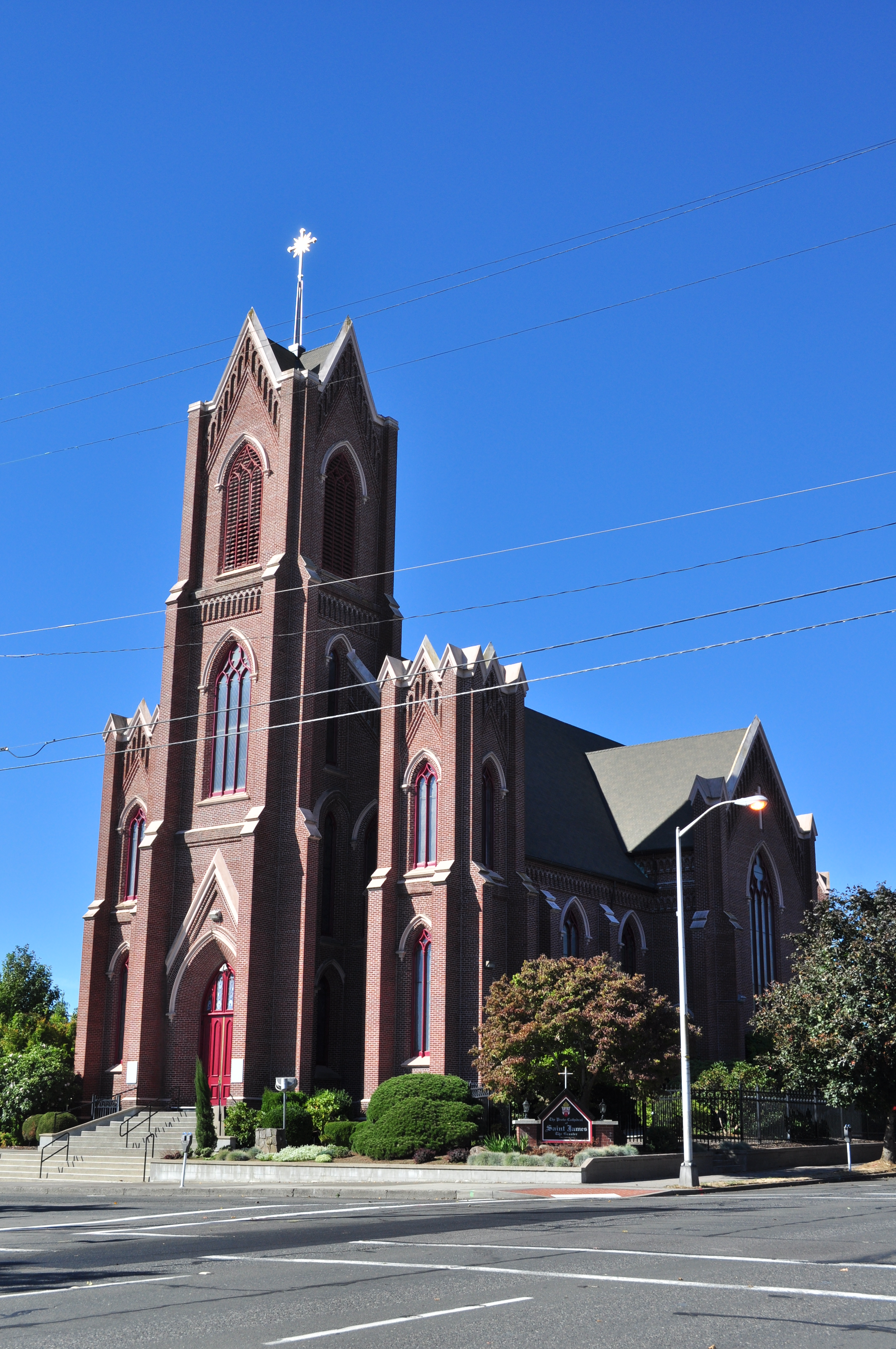
- St. James in 2014

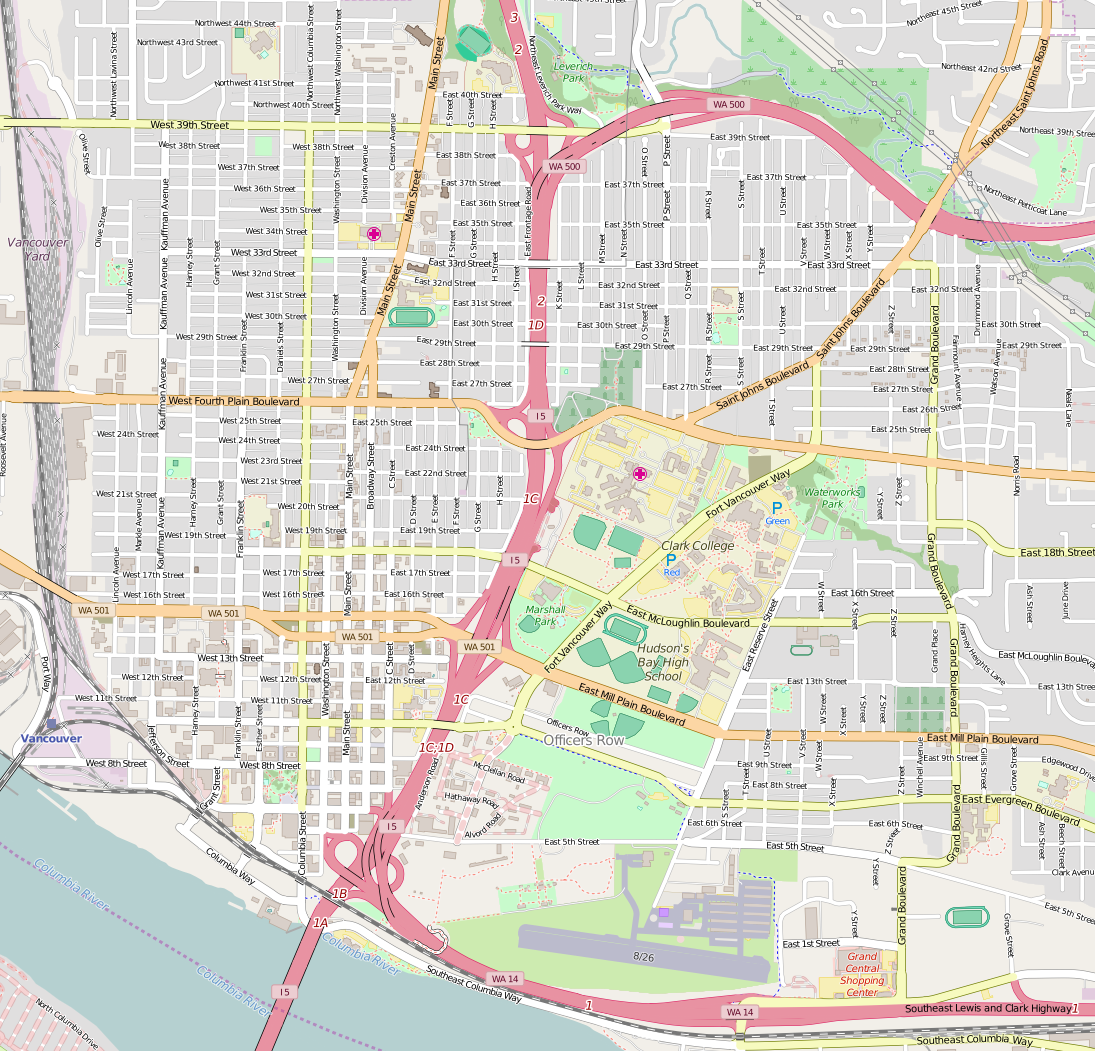
- Location within Vancouver Washington
- 45°37′51″N 122°40′23″W
- Location: 218 W 12th St. Vancouver, Washington
- Country: United States
- Denomination: Roman Catholic
- Website: protocathedral.org

History
- Status: Proto-cathedral
- Founded: November 24, 1838
- Founder(s): François Norbert Blanchet and Modeste Demers
- Dedication: May 31, 1846

Architecture
- Architect: Donald MacKay
- Style: Gothic Revival
- Completed: 1885

Specifications
- Materials: Brick

Administration
- Archdiocese: Seattle

Clergy
- Archbishop: Most Rev. Paul D. Etienne
- Pastor(s): Rev. Timothy Ilgen, Fr. Kyle Rink, Fr. Kingsley Tebulo

The Proto-Cathedral of St. James the Greater (formerly St. James Catholic Church) is a church building and parish of the Catholic Church located in Vancouver, Washington, United States. The parish is part of the Archdiocese of Seattle and traces its roots to the initial arrival of missionary priests in the Oregon Country in the 1830s; its first dedicated church building was built in 1846. The church was elevated to a cathedral when the Diocese of Nesqually (the original name of the Archdiocese of Seattle) was established in 1850; the present-day church building was completed in 1885. It was reverted to a parish church when the present-day St. James Cathedral opened in Seattle in 1907. The church building was listed on the Washington Heritage Register in 1986. The church was formally dedicated as a proto-cathedral, i.e., former cathedral, in 2013.

== History ==
In the 1830s, French Canadian Catholic employees of the Hudson's Bay Company petitioned the bishop in their native Quebec to send priests to what was then known as the Oregon Country. François Norbert Blanchet and Modeste Demers were sent to the area and arrived at Fort Vancouver in 1838. Blanchet and Demers held Masses in various buildings within the fort, and Catholics often had to share worship space with Protestants, an arrangement that did not please either group. In 1845 Blanchet gained the company's permission to build a new church just outside the fort, and the wooden building was dedicated as St. James Church on May 30, 1846.

In July 1846, the Vatican established three Catholic dioceses in the Oregon Country: Oregon City, Vancouver Island, and Walla Walla. Augustin-Magloire Blanchet, François Blanchet's younger brother, was appointed bishop of Walla Walla. The Walla Walla diocese was abandoned shortly after, in the wake of the Whitman massacre; however, on May 31, 1850, the Vatican under Pope Pius IX established the Diocese of Nesqually, with Augustin Blanchet as its bishop. Blanchet chose to have his new diocese headquartered in Vancouver, and chose the existing St. James Church as his cathedral. The church was formally dedicated as St. James Cathedral on January 23, 1851.

Blanchet retired in 1879 and his successor, Egidius Junger, set out to build a new cathedral in Vancouver. In 1883 they chose Seattle architect Donald Mackay, who had already established his reputation with the Catholic church by designing a new sanctuary and hospital in Seattle and in Vancouver with the design of the Clark County Courthouse the year prior. The design was completed by March 1883, construction began in 1884 and the 145-metre (476 ft)-long cathedral was dedicated as St. James Cathedral the following year. The original church, meanwhile, burned down in 1889.

Junger's successor, Edward John O'Dea, realized that Vancouver was no longer the economic and population center it once was. In 1903, O'Dea transferred the episcopal see of the Diocese of Nisqually to Seattle and immediately set out to build a new cathedral there. The diocese was officially renamed the Diocese of Seattle in September 1907, and the present-day St. James Cathedral in Seattle was dedicated in December of that year. St. James Cathedral in Vancouver, meanwhile, was reverted to a parish church, as it had been before the diocese's establishment, and remains a parish church to the present day.

=== Modern history ===
The protocathedral was renovated in 2008 by the decision of Father Dominic Hahn, and was completed by Father W.R. Harris.

In 2013, Archbishop J. Peter Sartain announced that St. James Church would be formally designated as a proto-cathedral (former cathedral) in order to recognize the church's historical significance to the Archdiocese of Seattle. It was formally dedicated by Archbishop Sartain on October 25, 2013, and the church was renamed the Proto-Cathedral of St. James the Greater.

Since 2014, masses during Advent and on Solemnities have been celebrated ad orientem, that is the same direction as the congregants and towards the "liturgical east," as was the norm before Vatican II, and since 2016 all masses at St. James are now celebrated ad orientem. This change was made at the encouragement of Cardinal Robert Sarah, the head of the Vatican's Congregation for Divine Worship. This practice seems to have ceased, as of 2024.

Blending Latin and English, masses at the Proto-Cathedral feature Gregorian chant, English chant and polyphony.

== See also ==
- List of Catholic cathedrals in the United States
- List of cathedrals in the United States
