= Thomas Edward Gill =

American Catholic prelage (1908–1973)

His Excellency, the Most Reverend Thomas Edward Gill
- Auxiliary Bishop of Seattle; Titular Bishop of Lambaesis
- Church: Catholic Church
- Archdiocese: Seattle
- See: Lambaesis
- Appointed: April 11, 1956
- Installed: May 31, 1956
- Term ended: November 11, 1973
- Previous post: Director of Catholic Charities

Orders
- Ordination: June 10, 1933
- Consecration: May 31, 1956 by: Thomas Arthur Connolly; Joseph Patrick Dougherty; Hugh Aloysius Donohoe

Personal details
- Born: March 18, 1908 Seattle, Washington, US
- Died: November 11, 1973 (aged 65) Washington, D.C., US
- Buried: Holyrood Catholic Cemetery, Shoreline, Washington
- Education: St. Joseph's Preparatory Seminary; St. Patrick's Seminary; Catholic University of America (M.S.W.)
- Motto: Secundum verbum tuum (Latin for 'According to your word')

Thomas Edward Gill (March 18, 1908 – November 11, 1973) was an American Catholic prelate who served as titular bishop of Lambaesis and auxiliary bishop of the Archdiocese of Seattle from 1956 to 1973. He was the first Seattle-born priest to be ordained a bishop.

== Biography ==
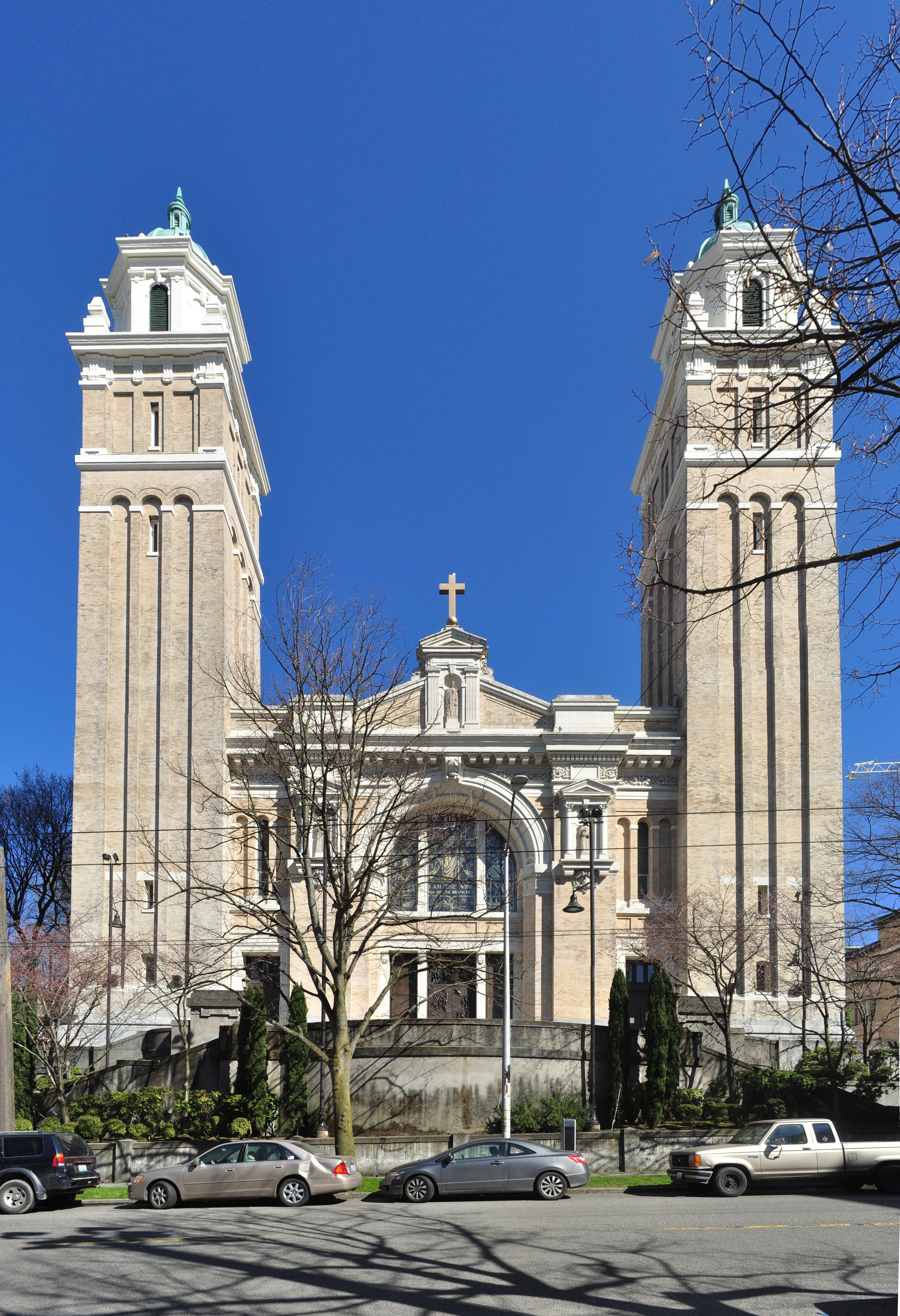
St. James Cathedral, Seattle, Washington.

=== Early life ===
Thomas Gill was born on March 18, 1908, in Seattle, Washington. He attended St. Joseph’s School, O'Dea High School and Seattle Preparatory School, all in Seattle. Having decided to become a priest, Gill then enrolled at St. Joseph's College in Mountainview, California. He completed his preparation for the priesthood in 1933.

=== Priesthood ===
Gill was ordained to the priesthood for the Archdiocese of Seattle on June 10, 1933, in San Francisco by Archbishop Edward Hanna. After his 1933 ordination, the archdiocese assigned Gill to the pastoral staff at St. Patrick's Parish in Tacoma, Washington. A year later, he was transferred to St. Mary's Parish in Seattle.

In 1937, Gill traveled to Washington, D.C. to attend the Catholic University of America, where he received a Master of Social Work degree. Returning to Seattle in 1939, he was named director of Catholic Charities of Seattle. It coordinated orphanages as well as homes for the elderly and troubled youths. He once remarked"

“The supreme objective in this life is to offer youngsters the opportunity and the help to achieve the best possible adjustment to the real life… and that is the life that isn’t destined to end under a tombstone, but is life eternal.”

Gill in 1955 was named pastor of St. James Cathedral in Seattle.

=== Auxiliary Bishop of Seattle ===
On April 11, 1956, Gill was appointed auxiliary bishop of Seattle and titular bishop of Lambaesis by Pope Pius XII. He was consecrated on May 31, 1956, at St. James Cathedral by Archbishop Thomas Connolly, with Bishops Joseph Dougherty and Hugh Donohoe as co-consecrators.

As auxiliary bishop, Gill built Catholic Children's Services into the largest private child‐care agency in Washington state and served as the pastor of St. James Cathedral in Seattle.

=== Death and legacy ===
Gill died of a heart attack on November 11, 1973, while checking into the Statler Hilton Hotel in Washington, D.C. for a meeting of the National Conference of Catholic Bishops.
