= Archbishop Murphy High School =

Private, coeducational school in Everett, Washington, U.S.

Archbishop Thomas J. Murphy High School

Location
- 12911 39th Avenue SE; Everett, (Snohomish County), Washington 98208; United States; 47°52′51″N 122°10′41″W

Information
- Type: Private, coeducational
- Motto: “In Christ, There is Joy and Hope”
- Religious affiliation: Roman Catholic
- Established: 1988; 38 years ago
- Founder: Terry Ennis
- CEEB code: 480-391
- Principal: Alicia Mitchell
- Head of school: Steve Schmutz
- Faculty: 39
- Grades: 9–12
- Average class size: 19
- Student to teacher ratio: 11:1
- Campus size: 21 acres
- Colors: Black, red and white
- Song: AMHS Fight Song
- Athletics conference: Wesco 2A/ Northwest Conference 2A (Football Only)
- Mascot: Wildcat
- Nickname: AMHS
- Team name: Wildcats
- Accreditation: Northwest Accreditation Commission
- Newspaper: Into The Jungle
- Tuition: $21,099
- Website: School website

Archbishop Thomas J. Murphy High School is a co-educational private Catholic college-preparatory high school located in Everett, Washington, United States. Founded as Holy Cross High School in 1988 at the old site of Our Lady Of Perpetual Help grade school, it was renamed Archbishop Murphy High School in 1999 and moved to its present location in the October of that year.

The school serves students grades nine through twelve; enrollment has increased from 23 students in 1988 to approximately 467 in 2019.

It is named for Thomas Joseph Murphy, the archbishop of the Archdiocese of Seattle from 1991 until his death in 1997.

== Sports ==
- Cross Country
- Track and Field
- Football (2002 and 2003 1A State Champions, 2016 and 2025 2A State Champions)
- Volleyball
- Soccer (2015, 2016, 2017 State Champions)
- Wrestling
- Basketball
- Golf
- Softball
- Baseball
- Swimming
- Tennis
- Lacrosse

Since 2004, Archbishop Murphy has been classified as a 2A school by the WIAA.

In the 2016 football season, 5 schools from the Cascade Conference forfeited league football games against the Archbishop Murphy High School Wildcats, citing depth concerns, fear of injury, and competitive imbalance. Archbishop Murphy went on to win their first 2A state football championship in December of that year.

Recent Sports Success

In 2025 Archbishop Murphy won the 2A State Championship 35-20 beating the Tumwater High School Thunderbirds on December 6 2025. This was their 4th ever state championship, winning in 2001, 2002, 2016 and now 2025 In 2021 the Women's Soccer team beat the Hockinson High School Hawks 2-0. It was AMHS 3rd championship winning in 2006 and 2009.
