= Edward John O'Dea =

American Catholic bishop (1856–1932)

His Excellency, the Most Reverend Edward John O'Dea
- Bishop of Seattle
- Church: Catholic Church
- Diocese: Nesqually
- Installed: June 13, 1896
- Term ended: December 25, 1932
- Predecessor: Egidius Junger
- Successor: Gerald Shaughnessy

Orders
- Ordination: December 23, 1882
- Consecration: September 8, 1896

Personal details
- Born: November 23, 1856 Boston, Massachusetts, US
- Died: December 25, 1932 (aged 76) Seattle, Washington, US
- Buried: Holyrood Catholic Cemetery; Shoreline, Washington, US
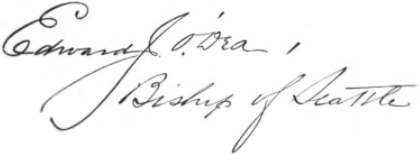
- Signature: Edward John O'Dea's signature

Styles of Edward John O'Dea
- Reference style: The Most Reverend
- Spoken style: Your Excellency
- Religious style: Monsignor

Edward John O'Dea (November 23, 1856 – December 25, 1932) was an American prelate of the Catholic Church. He served as bishop of the Diocese of Nesqually in Washington from 1896 until 1907. When the Vatican renamed the diocese as the Diocese of Seattle in 1907, O'Dea served as its bishop until his death in 1932.

O'Dea was responsible for the construction of St. James Cathedral in Seattle, Washington.

== Biography ==
=== Early life ===
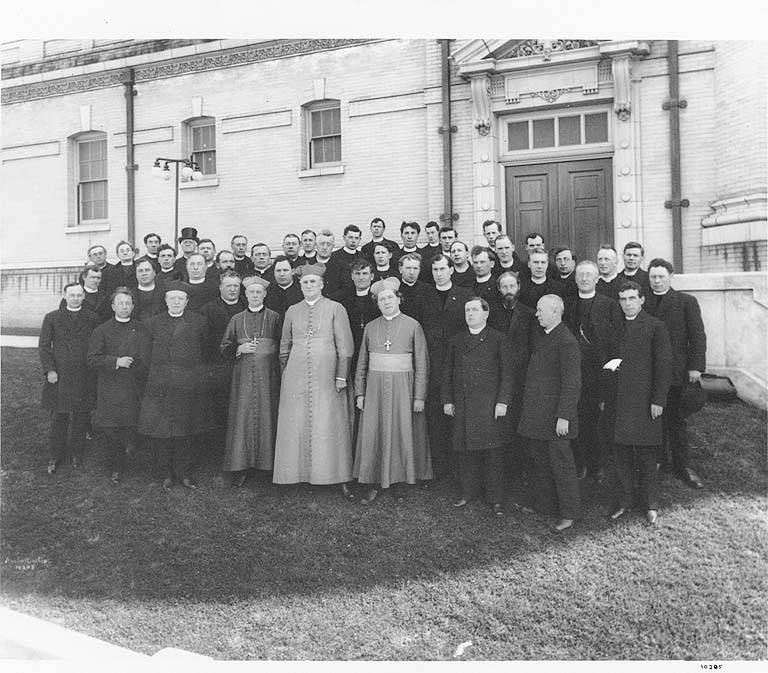
Bishop O'Dea (center) celebrating his Silver Jubilee at St. James Cathedral in 1908

Edward O'Dea was born in the Dorchester neighborhood of Boston, Massachusetts, to Edward and Ellen (née Kelly) O'Dea, both Irish immigrants. Edward O'Dea elder traveled west during the California Gold Rush in 1849. The family settled in Portland, Oregon, in 1866.

Edward O'Dea younger attended St. Ignatius College in San Francisco, California and graduated from St. Michael's College in Portland in 1876. He continued his studies at the Grand Seminary of Montréal in Montreal, Quebec.

=== Priesthood ===
O'Dea was ordained to the priesthood by Archbishop Édouard-Charles Fabre on December 23, 1882. Following his return to Portland, he served as a curate at the Cathedral of the Immaculate Conception Parish. He served as private secretary to Archbishop William Gross until 1892, when he became pastor of St. Patrick's Church in Portland.

=== Bishop of Nesqually ===
On June 13, 1896, O'Dea was appointed the third Bishop of Nesqually by Pope Leo XIII.He received his episcopal consecration on September 8, 1896, from Archbishop Gross, with Bishops Jean-Nicolas Lemmens and Alphonse Glorieux serving as co-consecrators, at St. James Cathedral (now a proto-cathedral) in Vancouver.

When he took office, O'Dea was confronted with financial difficulties, including a $25,000 debt for the construction of the cathedral in Vancouver.

=== Bishop of Seattle ===
The Vatican renamed the diocese as the Diocese of Seattle on September 11, 1907, and moved the seat of the diocese from Vancouver to Seattle's Capitol Hill. O'Dea dedicated St. James Cathedral later that year. He guided the diocese through World War I and the anti-Catholic sentiment engendered by Initiative 49. This was a Ku Klux Klan-sponsored initiative in the Washington State Legislature to ban parochial schools. His final accomplishment was the establishment of St. Edward Seminary in Kenmore, Washington, in 1930.

=== Death and legacy ===
O'Dea died on December 25, 1932, at age 76, two days after celebrating the 50th anniversary of his ordination. His final words were "God bless you all."

O'Dea High School in Seattle was named after O'Dea.

Catholic Church titles
Preceded by Egidius Junger	Bishop of Seattle; 1896–1932	Succeeded by Gerald Shaughnessy
