= Egidius Junger =

German–American Catholic bishop

His Excellency, The Most Reverend Egidius Jünger
- Bishop of Nesqually
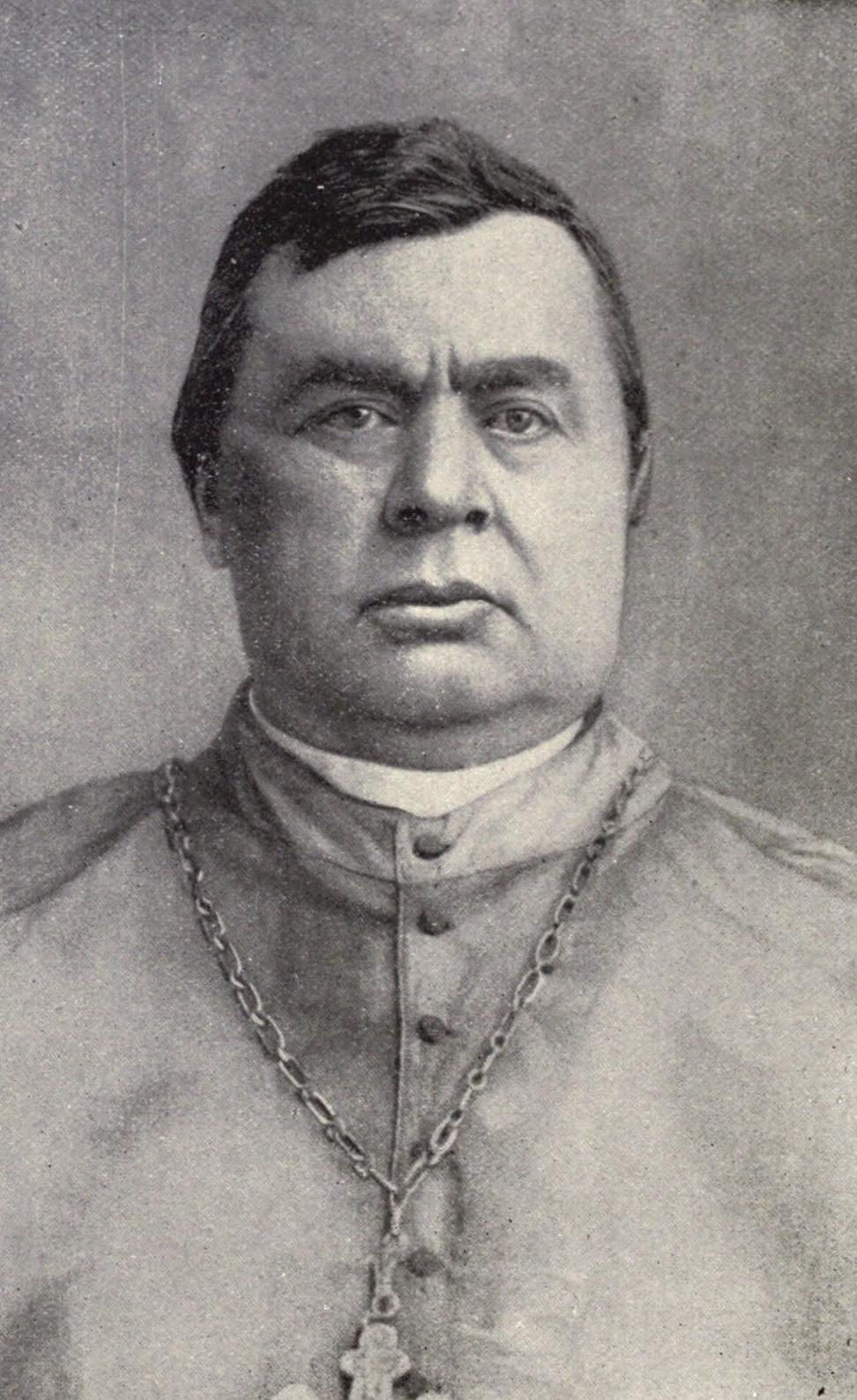
- Diocese: Nesqually
- Appointed: August 6, 1879
- Term ended: December 26, 1895
- Predecessor: Augustin-Magloire Blanchet
- Successor: Edward John O'Dea

Orders
- Ordination: June 27, 1862 by Engelbert Sterckx
- Consecration: October 28, 1879 by François Norbert Blanchet

Personal details
- Born: April 6, 1833 Burtscheid, Rhine Province, Kingdom of Prussia (present-day Germany)
- Died: December 26, 1895 (aged 62) Vancouver, Washington, US
- Education: Catholic University of Leuven

Egidius Jünger, also spelled Aegidius Jünger (April 6, 1833 – December 26, 1895), was a German-born prelate of the Catholic Church. He served as bishop of the Diocese of Nesqually (now the Archdiocese of Seattle) in the Washington Territory in the United States from 1879 until his death in 1895.

== Biography ==
=== Early life ===
Egidius Jünger was born on April 6, 1833, in Burtscheid in Rhenish Prussia (in what is today Germany). He received his early education at the schools of Burtscheid and made his classical studies at the gymnasium of Aachen. In 1853, Jünger entered the Catholic University of Leuven in Leuven, Belgium.

=== Priesthood ===
Jünger was ordained to the priesthood in Mechelen, Belgium on June 27, 1862. He came to the United States as a missionary in October of that year, being stationed at Walla Walla, Washington. He became rector of St. James Cathedral in Vancouver, Washington, in 1864.

=== Bishop of Nesqually ===
On August 6, 1879, Jünger was appointed the second Bishop of Nesqually by Pope Leo XIII. He received his episcopal consecration on October 28, 1879, from Archbishop François Blanchet in Oregon City, Oregon.

The diocese experienced considerable growth under his administration, including an increase in the number of priests and parishes and the number of nuns in the region increased from about 60 to 286. Under Jünger's leadership, a large cathedral was built in Vancouver, Washington, in 1888 to replace the old wooden church built in 1846 by Bishops François Norbert Blanchet and Modeste Demers, but the $50,000 financial debt the project created weighed upon him.

A contemporary account described Jünger as a hard worker who lived a simple lifestyle and built good relationships with his priests and parishioners.

=== Death and legacy ===
Egidius Jünger died at Vancouver on December 26, 1895, at age 62.

Catholic Church titles
Preceded by Augustin-Magloire Blanchet	Bishop of Nesqually; 1879–1895	Succeeded by Edward John O'Dea
