= St. James Cathedral (Seattle) =

Catholic church in Seattle, Washington, US

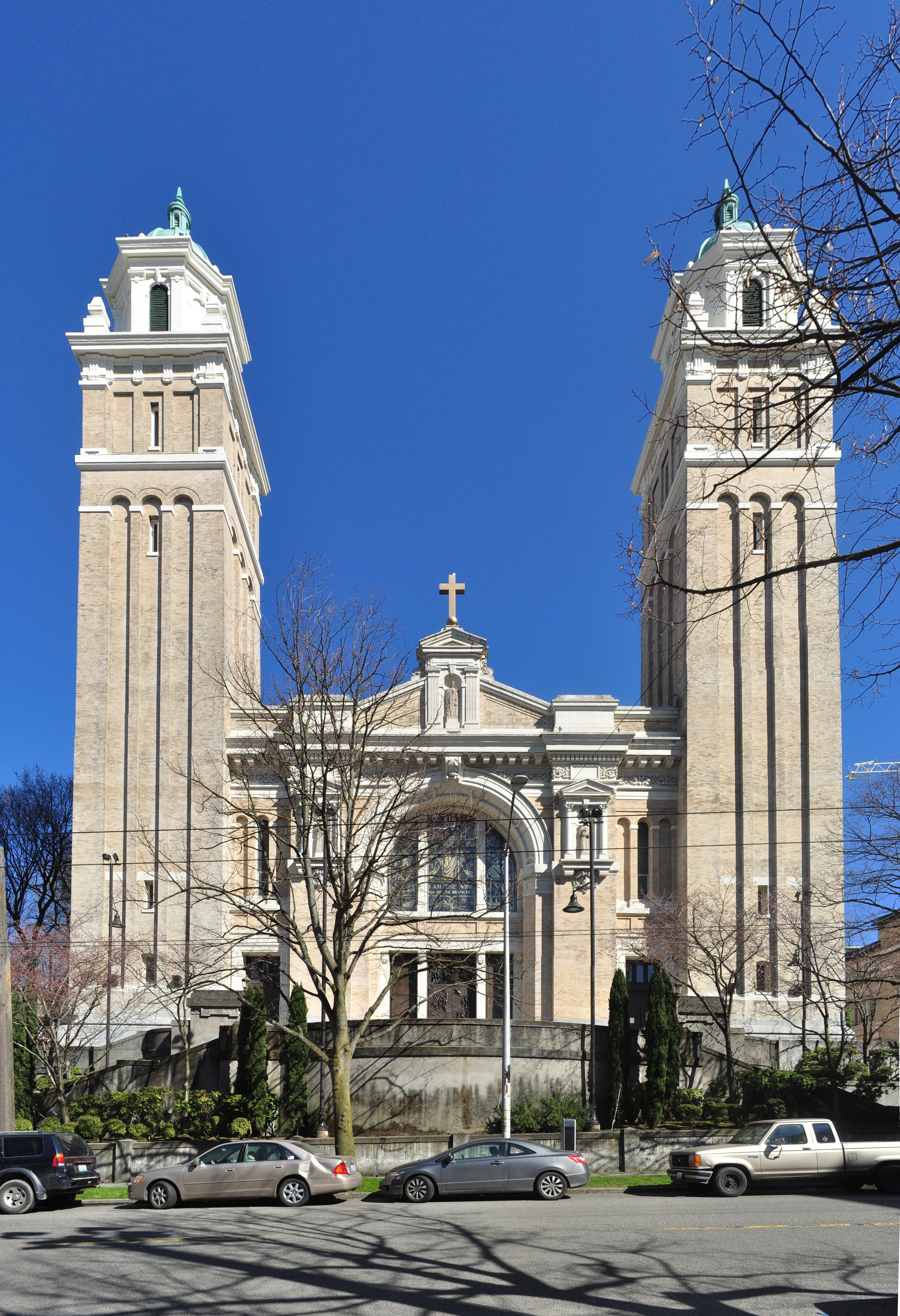
- Panoramic view of the western façade

- Location within central Seattle
- 47°36′28″N 122°19′33″W
- Location: 804 Ninth Avenue; Seattle, Washington
- Country: United States
- Denomination: Catholic Church
- Sui iuris church: Latin Church
- Tradition: Roman Rite
- Website: www.stjames-cathedral.org

History
- Status: Cathedral
- Dedication: St. James the Greater
- Dedicated: 1907

Architecture
- Functional status: Active
- Heritage designation: Seattle Landmark
- Designated: March 12, 1984
- Architect: Heins & LaFarge
- Style: Renaissance Revival
- Completed: 1907; 119 years ago

Specifications
- Height: 167 feet (51 m) (spires); 120 feet (37 m) (dome) – collapsed in 1916; never rebuilt

Administration
- Archdiocese: Seattle

Clergy
- Archbishop: Paul D. Etienne
- Pastor: Gary F. Lazzeroni

St. James Cathedral is a Catholic cathedral located at 804 Ninth Avenue in the First Hill neighborhood of Seattle, Washington, United States. It is the mother church of the Archdiocese of Seattle and the seat of its archbishop, currently Paul D. Etienne. The cathedral is named for St. James the Greater, patron saint of the archdiocese, and is the third church in the territory presently known as the Archdiocese of Seattle to bear the name.

The need for a cathedral in Seattle arose in 1903 when Edward O'Dea, bishop of what was then known as the Diocese of Nesqually (later spelled "Nisqually"), elected to move the episcopal see from Vancouver, Washington, to Seattle. Construction began in 1905. The cathedral was dedicated in 1907. In 1916, the cathedral underwent major renovations as a result of the collapse of its dome; other significant renovations were completed in 1950 and 1994. The cathedral, rectory, and site were designated city landmarks in 1984.

== History ==
The Diocese of Nesqually was established in Vancouver, Washington, on May 31, 1850, by Pope Pius IX. The new diocese's territory was carved from the former Diocese of Walla Walla, which had been abandoned and its territory administered from Oregon City in the wake of the Whitman massacre. Augustin-Magloire Blanchet, the first bishop of the new diocese, dedicated a cathedral in honor of Saints James and Augustine within Fort Vancouver on January 23, 1851.

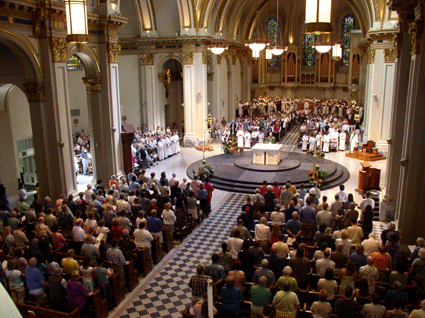
Worshipers gathered for Mass

Blanchet's successor, Aegidius Junger, set out to build a new St. James Cathedral in Vancouver. This building, which was completed in 1885, served as the cathedral for eighteen years and remains a Catholic church to the present day. Junger's successor, Edward O'Dea, realized that Vancouver's importance as an economic and population center was waning and at the urging of Reverend Francis X. Prefontaine, a priest in rapidly growing Seattle, O'Dea moved the episcopal see to Seattle in 1903, and immediately laid plans to build a new cathedral.

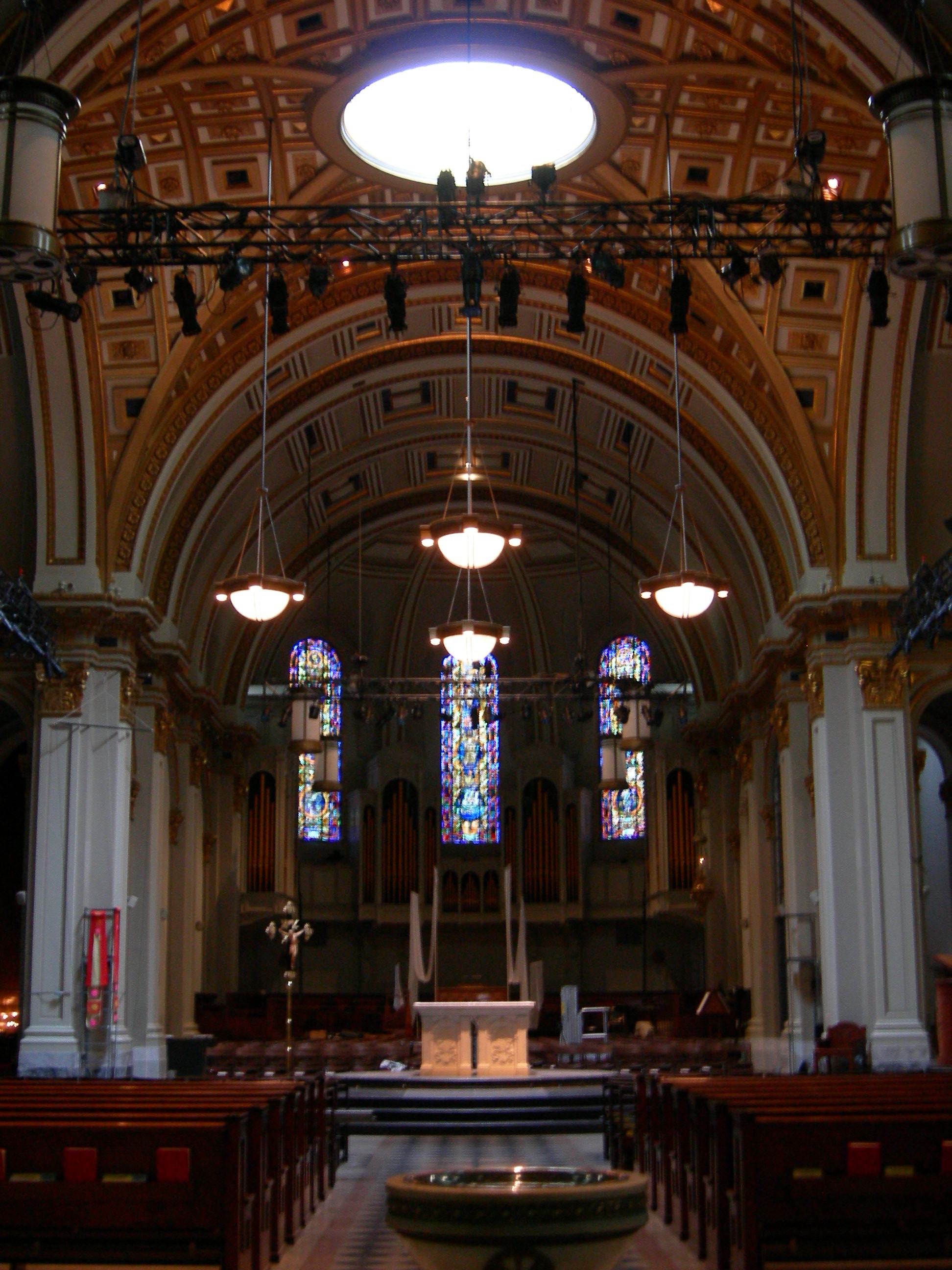
View up the nave to the apse with windows by Hans Gottfried von Stockhausen

O'Dea purchased the current cathedral site in 1903; planning began in 1904, and construction began in early 1905. The laying of the cornerstone of the cathedral took place on November 12, 1905, in the presence of more than five thousand people. It was said to be the largest religious gathering in Seattle up to that time. While the cathedral was under construction, a small temporary structure, St. Edward's Chapel, served as the pro-cathedral for Bishop O'Dea. It was designed by Seattle architect James Stephen and was located on the cathedral block, at the corner of Terry Avenue and Columbia Street. The Diocese of Nisqually was officially renamed the Diocese of Seattle on September 11, 1907, and the cathedral was dedicated on December 22 of that year.

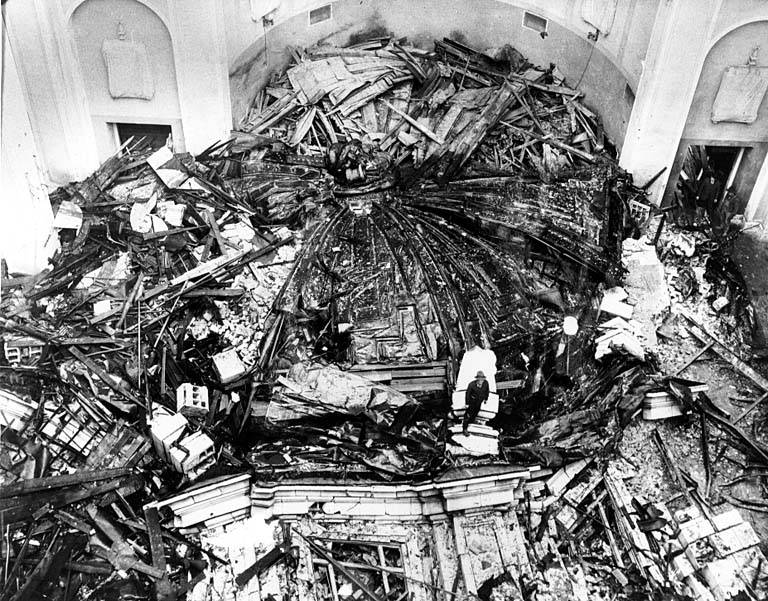
1916 Dome Collapse

On February 2, 1916, the 60-foot (18 m) dome that crowned the cathedral collapsed under the weight of heavy snow accumulation. The dome was never rebuilt, and when the cathedral reopened on March 18, 1917, the interior had changed dramatically. Another major renovation took place in 1950, marking the centennial of the diocese. In 1984, the Seattle City Council designated the cathedral, rectory, and grounds as a city landmark.

In 1994, the cathedral underwent its most recent major restoration and renovation, which sought to incorporate changes brought about by the Second Vatican Council. The liturgical design consultant for the renovation was Father Richard S. Vosko, a priest of the Diocese of Albany. These changes included moving the altar from its original location at the east end of the cathedral to the crossing at the center of the building. The renovation also included the installation of an oculus and skylight above the new altar, where the dome had been. As part of the 1994 renovation, relics of St. Frances Xavier Cabrini were sealed beneath the altar; Cabrini had worshiped at the cathedral while she worked in Seattle from 1903 to 1916.

The cathedral today sponsors numerous outreach ministries, to the poor, the homeless, and the marginalized, such as the Cathedral Kitchen, Homeless Ministry & Nightwatch, St. Vincent de Paul, Environmental Justice, Housing Advocacy, and St. James Immigrant Assistance Program. These are operated out of Cathedral Hall and the Pastoral Outreach Center, once the convent of the Sisters of the Holy Names of Jesus and Mary, who run Holy Names Academy.

=== Parish Family 17 ===
In 2024, as part of the archdiocesan Partners in the Gospel strategic planning campaign, St. James Cathedral was partnered with Christ Our Hope Parish in Belltown and Immaculate Conception Parish in the Central District to form Parish Family 17, with the intention of the three parishes merging in 2027 to form a single canonical parish.

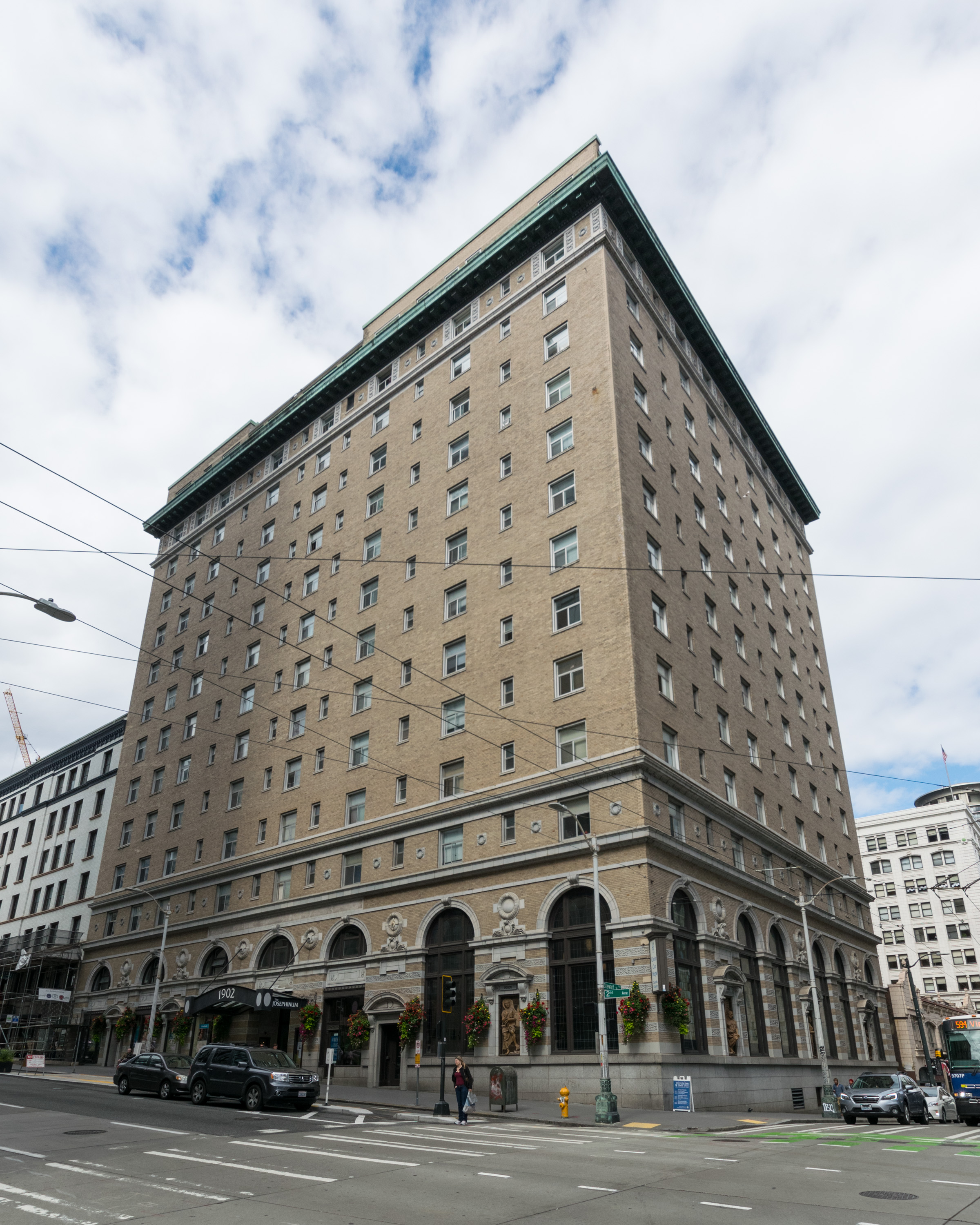
The Josephinum, home to Catholic Community Services housing as well as Christ Our Hope Church.

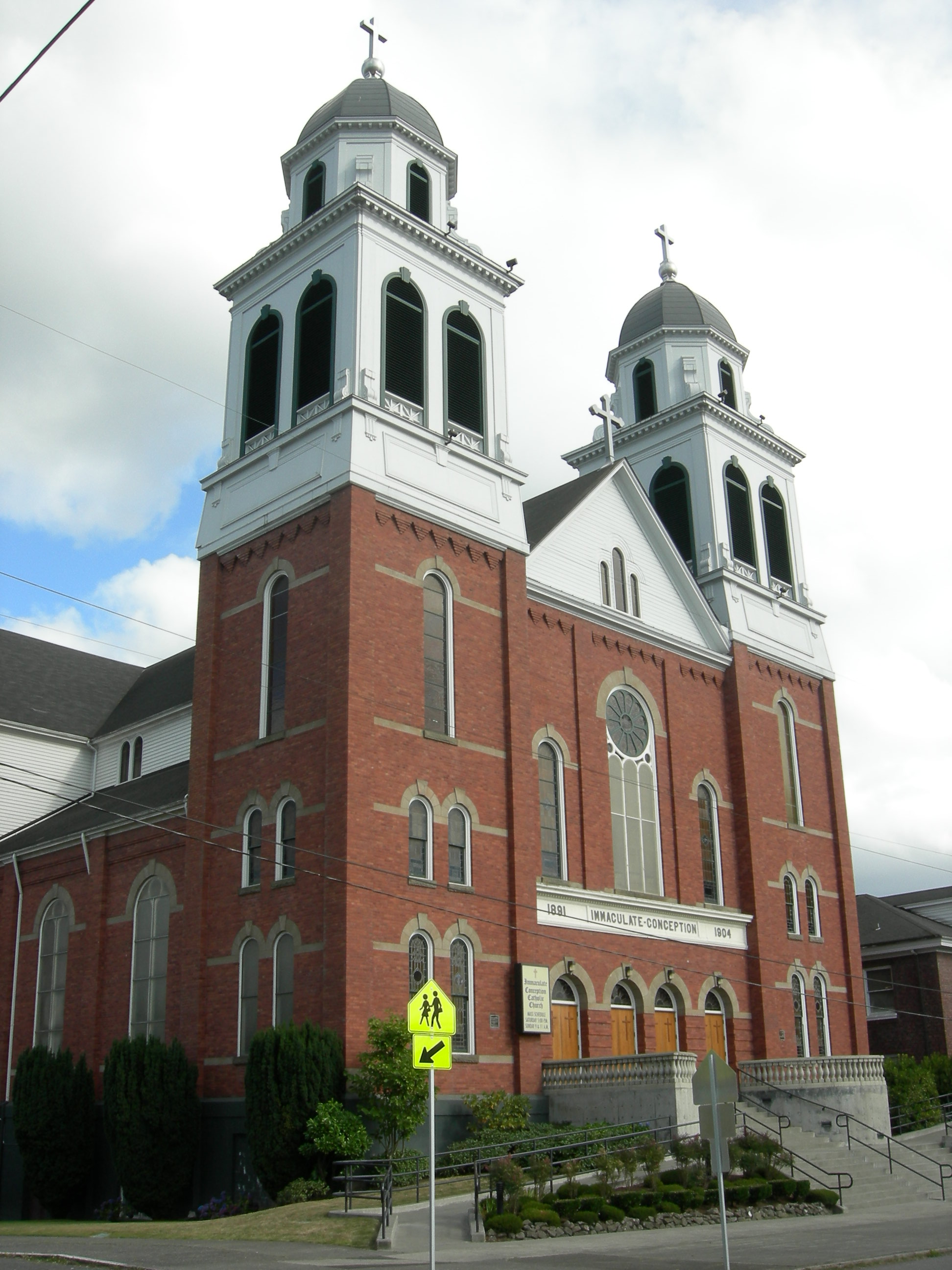
Immaculate Conception Church, the oldest Catholic Church in Seattle

== Exterior ==
The cathedral's roof is covered in red interlocking clay roof tiles originally manufactured by the Celadon Roofing Tile Company.

Major artwork at St. James Cathedral includes an extensive collection of stained glass by Charles Connick, installed in 1917-1920 during the rebuilding of the cathedral following the collapse of the dome. In 1994, three new windows were added, the work of Hans Gottfried von Stockhausen, a noted German stained-glass artist, who has served on the faculty of the Pilchuck School.

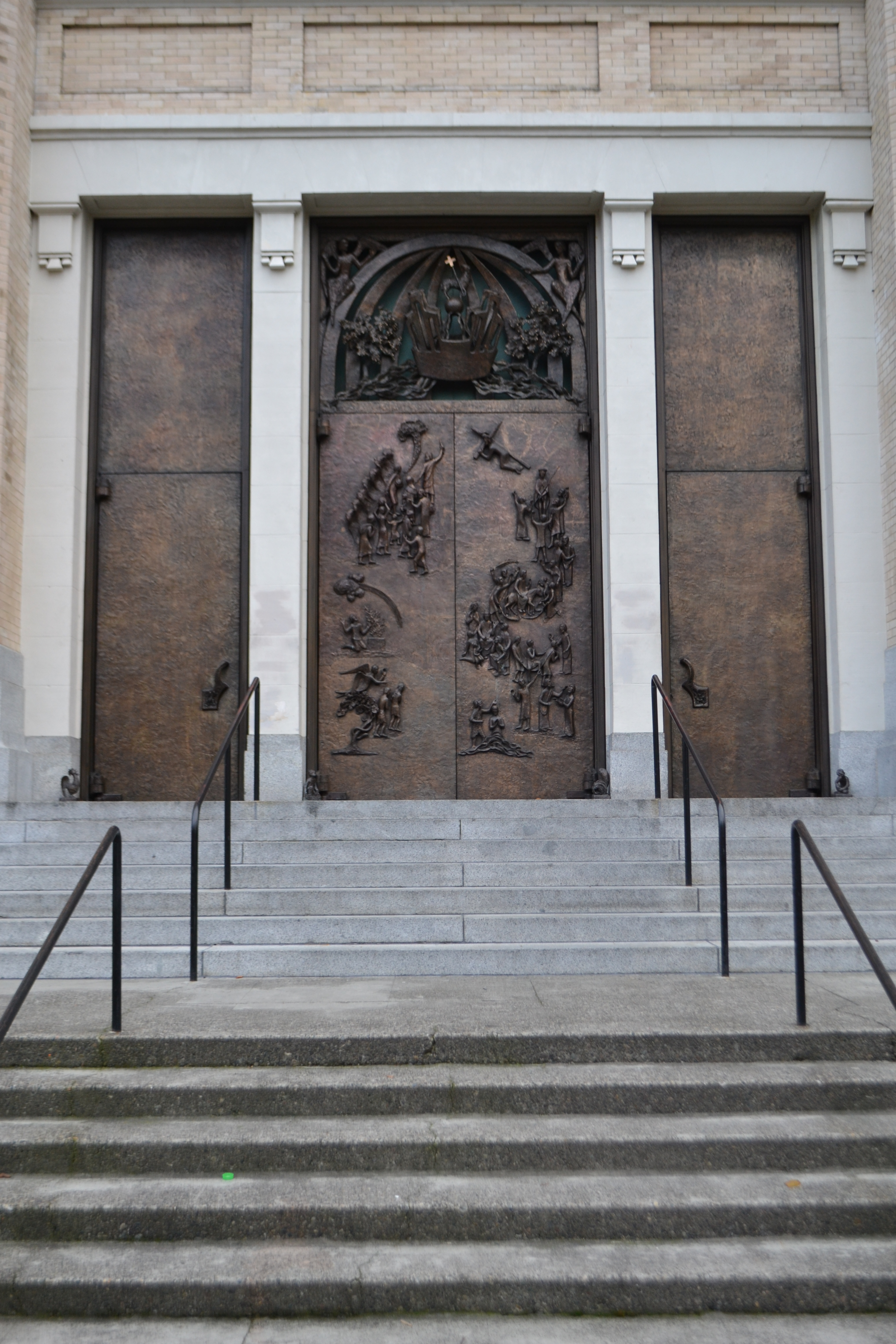
Ceremonial bronze doors on the west façade

In 1999, ceremonial bronze doors were added, the work of German sculptor Ulrich Henn. The central bronze doors portray humanity's pilgrimage to the heavenly Jerusalem. Old Testament scenes begin on the bottom left and show the journey of God's people: the expulsion from Eden, the sacrifice of Noah with a rainbow symbolizing the covenant, and Moses leading the people through the Red Sea. The right side shows Jesus’ journey, again beginning from the bottom: his baptism in the Jordan, the healing of the man born blind and the paralyzed man, preaching the Beatitudes, the entry into Jerusalem on Palm Sunday; the betrayal by Judas; the passion and carrying the cross.

In the tympanum above the door, the victorious Lamb of God brings the pilgrimage to its triumphant conclusion in the heavenly city. Rivers flow out of the city, and on the banks spring up trees, covered in fruit for the healing of the nations. Whereas the angel at Eden pointed the way out of paradise, this angel points the way to a new and greater paradise: the Lamb of God enthroned in heaven. A bronze tabernacle by the same artist was installed in 2003. Henn's only other works in the United States are the bronze gates at the National Cathedral in Washington, D.C.

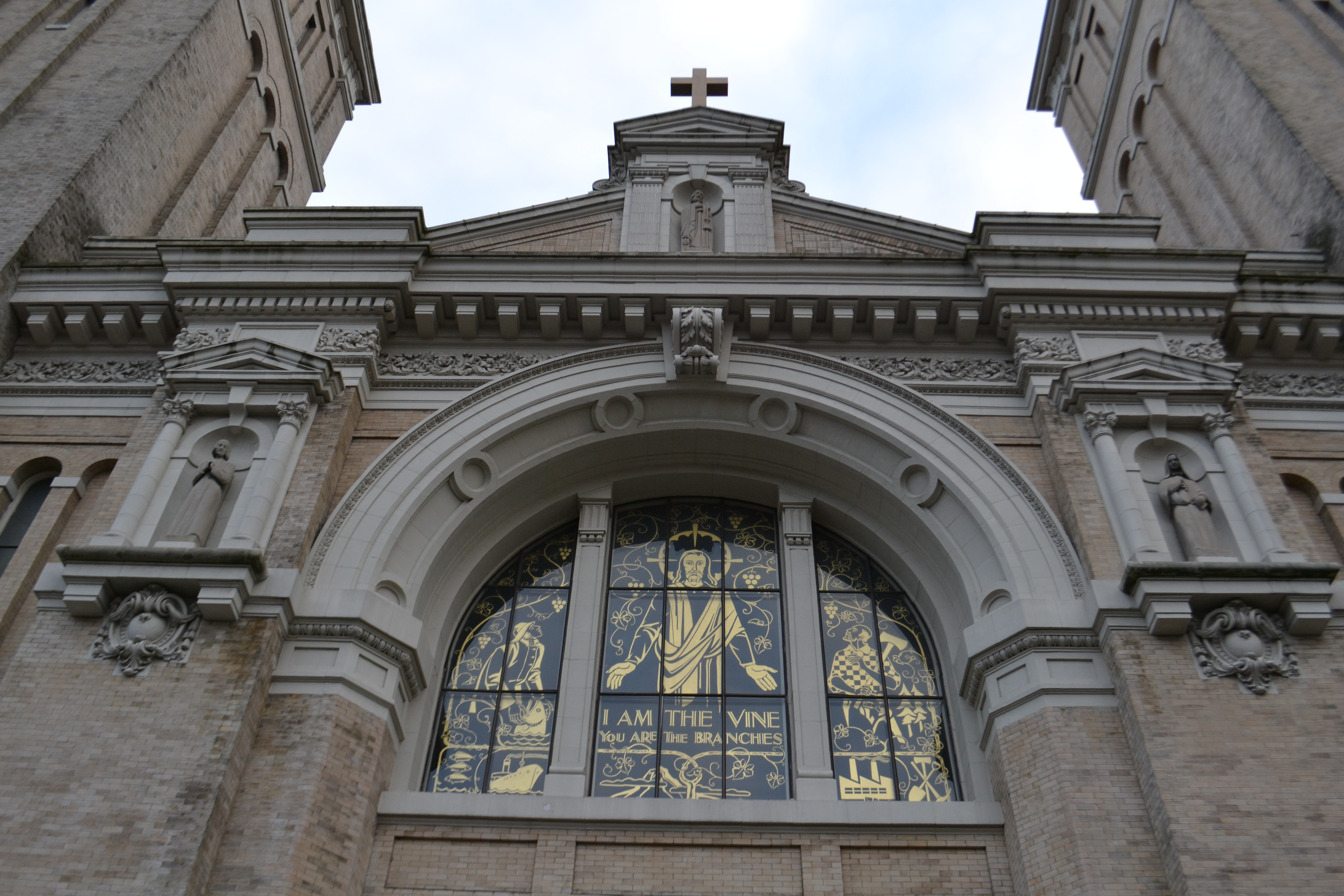
West façade with black and gilt window

Above the west door of the cathedral is a black and gilt window (1950) which shows Christ reaching out his hands in blessing. The text reads: “I am the vine, you are the branches” (John 15). The window celebrates the Pacific Northwest in the regional industries of 1950: fishing, shipping, lumber, and manufacturing, and includes a sketch of Mount Rainier. Vines laden with grapes link the northwestern motif with Christ's words.

Above the window, a statue of St. James the Greater, patron of the cathedral, surmounts the west face of the building. The figure of St. John Vianney (d. 1859) stands to the left. This patron saint of parish priests served in the French village of Ars, France. On the right is a statue of St. Frances Xavier Cabrini (d. 1917), first American citizen to be canonized. She worshipped in St. James Cathedral in its early years, when her missionary travels brought her to Seattle to serve Italian immigrants. All three of the façade statues were added as part of the 1950 renovation.

== Interior ==
The west vestibule floor contains a mosaic declaring, DOMUS DEI PORTA COELI: “House of God, Gate of Heaven” (Genesis 28:17). Along the walls of this vestibule white marble tablets honor many parishes and individuals who participated in the 1994 renovation and subsequent major projects. A bronze relief of St. Frances Cabrini recalls the fact that she became a citizen of the United States in Seattle. Tablets to the right of the main doors recognize other donors. Tablets on the east wall of the vestibule list the bishops of the Archdiocese of Seattle and the pastors of the cathedral.

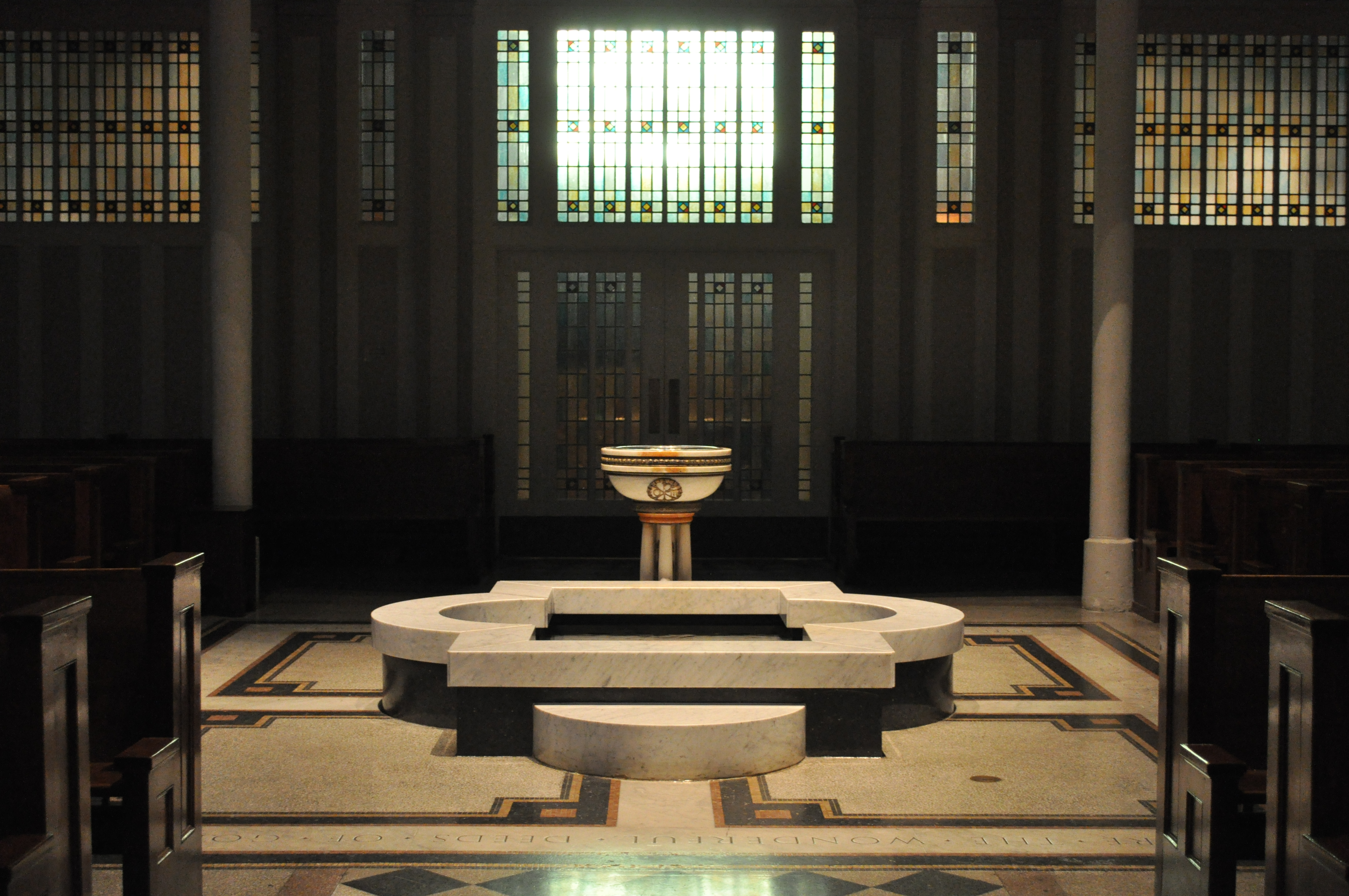
Baptistery

The baptistery and font are directly inside the west doors of the cathedral. The font is inscribed with the Chi Rho (XP), an ancient Greek abbreviation for the name Christ. Infants are baptized in the font throughout the year, while older children and adults descend into the pool to be baptized at the Easter Vigil. The inscription surrounding the baptistery expands on the text in the vestibule, stating “But you are a chosen race, a royal priesthood, a holy nation, God’s own people, that you may declare the wonderful deeds of God who called you out of darkness into marvelous light” (1 Peter 2:9). The pool's classical quatrefoil shape echoes the shape of the cathedral itself. Along the north wall stands the most recent addition to the cathedral's devotional works, a shrine honoring Saint John XXIII, the Pope who called the Second Vatican Council. St. James is the only cathedral in the United States with a shrine honoring this beloved saint. Dedicated in 2012 (when John XXIII had been beatified not yet been canonized), it is the work of Seattle artist John Sisko (d. 2016).

From the Ambo or pulpit the scriptures are proclaimed and the homily preached. Randall Rosenthal, a Jewish sculptor, interpreted the prophet Isaiah: “For just as from the heavens the rain and snow come down and do not return there till they have watered the earth, making it fertile and fruitful, giving seed to the one who sows and bread to the one who eats, so shall my Word be, that goes forth from my mouth; it shall not return to me void, but shall do my will, achieving the end for which I sent it” (Isaiah 55:10, 11). The carving uses northwest imagery in its depiction of clouds, rain, and abundant vegetation.

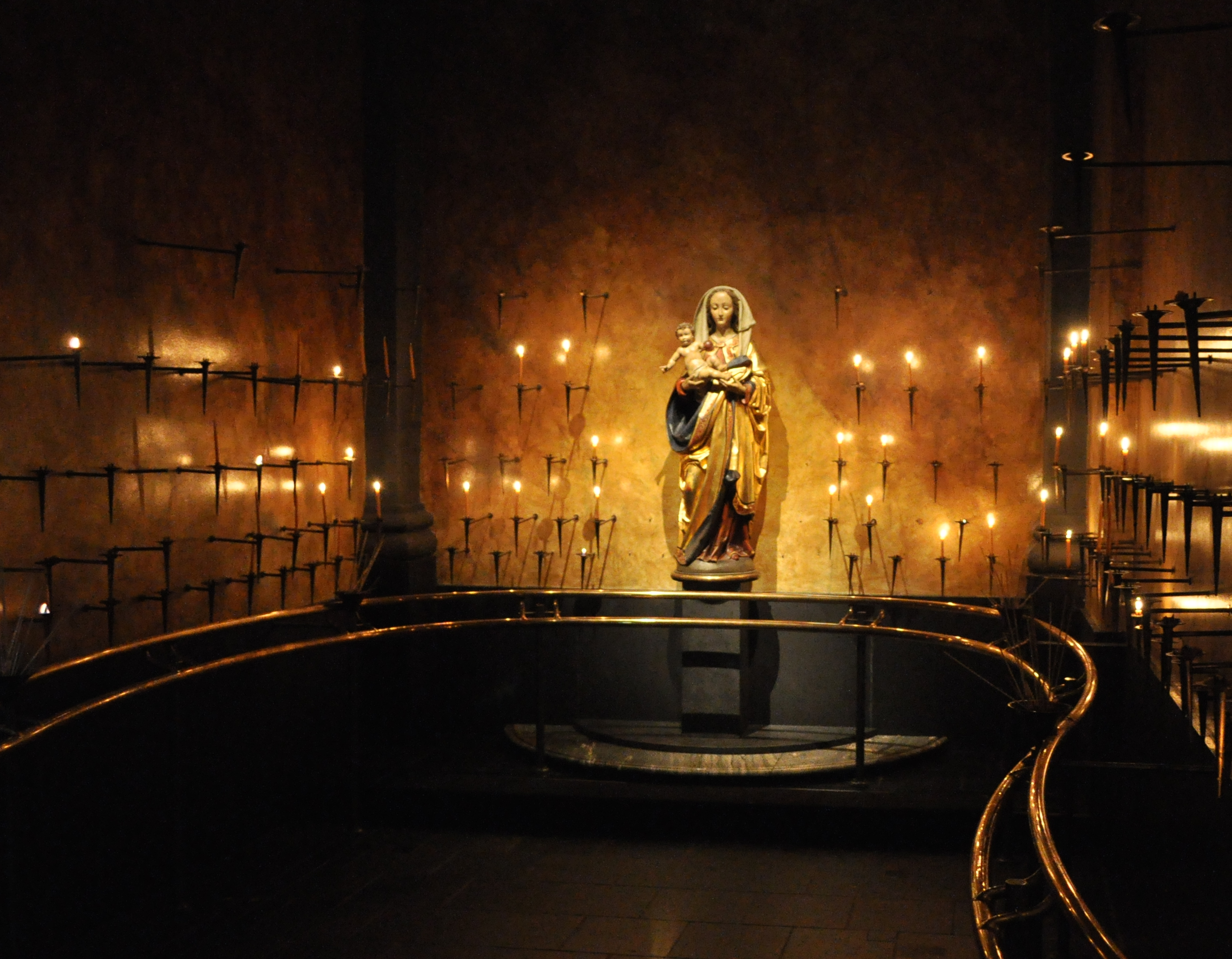
Shrine of the Blessed Virgin Mary

The Shrine of the Blessed Virgin Mary was designed by parishioner Susan Jones and is meant to evoke the warm and loving darkness of the womb. Following medieval tradition, the stars on the ceiling replicate the heavens as seen above Seattle on the night of December 22, the date of the cathedral's dedication. The statue of the Virgin and Child is modeled on a fifteenth-century statue in the German monastery of Blaubeuren.

The cathedral's original choir space in the west gallery features an organ built by the Boston firm of Hutchings-Votey (Opus 1623). This organ was installed and voiced by E. M. Skinner in 1907. In 1926 the east apse was converted into an additional choir area when a second organ built by Casavant was installed in the east end. In 2000, the Casavant was replaced with the Archbishop Thomas J. Murphy Millennium Organ, built by Rosales Organ Builders of Los Angeles, California (Opus 30) In addition, there is a two-manual organ by Frank Robl (cathedral chapel), and two portable organs by Laukhuff/Zuckerman and Alfred Führer.

The stained-glass windows in the East Apse are the work of Hans Gottfried von Stockhausen. They incorporate some of Charles Connick's 1918 stained glass, which furnish a background for Stockhausen's six roundels illustrating the works of mercy from Matthew 25. In an imaginative way, they portray the works of mercy in scenes from the Passion and Resurrection of Christ. The artist's hope was that in seeing these scenes from the life of Jesus, people would ask, ‘Where are these things happening today?’ From top to bottom:

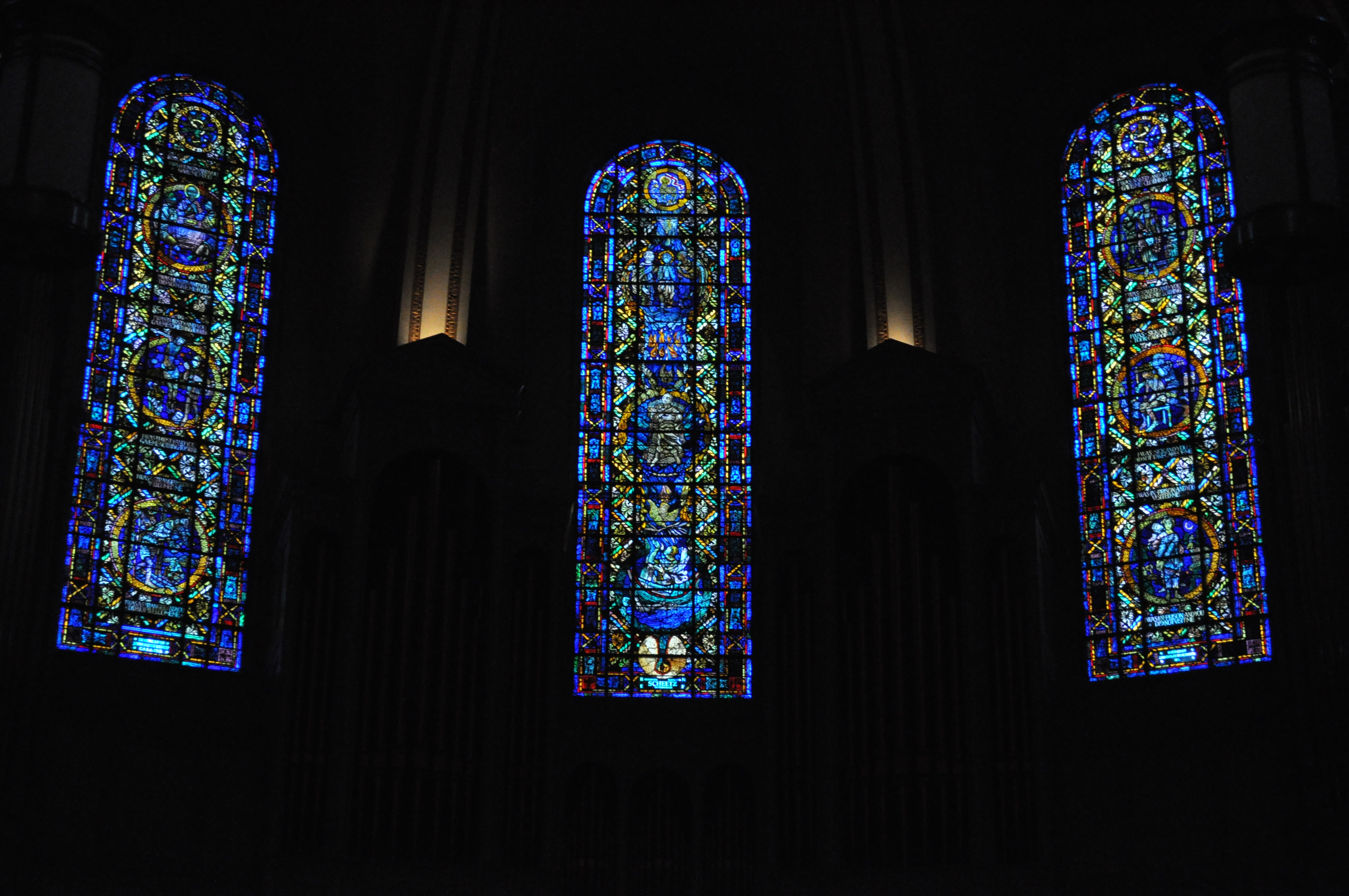
Detail of apse windows by Hans Gottfried von Stockhausen

- Jesus at Emmaus, blessing bread: “I was hungry…”
- Jesus crucified, with a soldier putting a sponge to his lips: “I was thirsty…”
- Women greeting Jesus along the way of the Cross: “I was a stranger…”

The right-hand panel shows:

- Jesus mockingly clothed in a purple cloak: “I was naked…”
- Jesus crowned with thorns: “I was sick…”
- Jesus arrested: “I was a prisoner…”

The central window tells the story of baptism. At the top of the window, Christ is baptized by John in the waters of the Jordan, with an angel looking on. In the center, Moses leads the People of Israel through the waters of the Red Sea, a prefiguring of baptism. Finally, at the bottom, in another prefiguring of baptism, Noah floats in the waters of the flood. He reaches toward a dove bearing an olive branch, a sign of life restored. Below that is a golden seed, nurtured by life-giving waters and breaking open to new life. The message written on the seed ties together and makes sense of the two outer windows: “As often as you did it to one of these, the least of my brothers or sisters, you did it to me.”(Matthew 25:40)

== Chapel ==
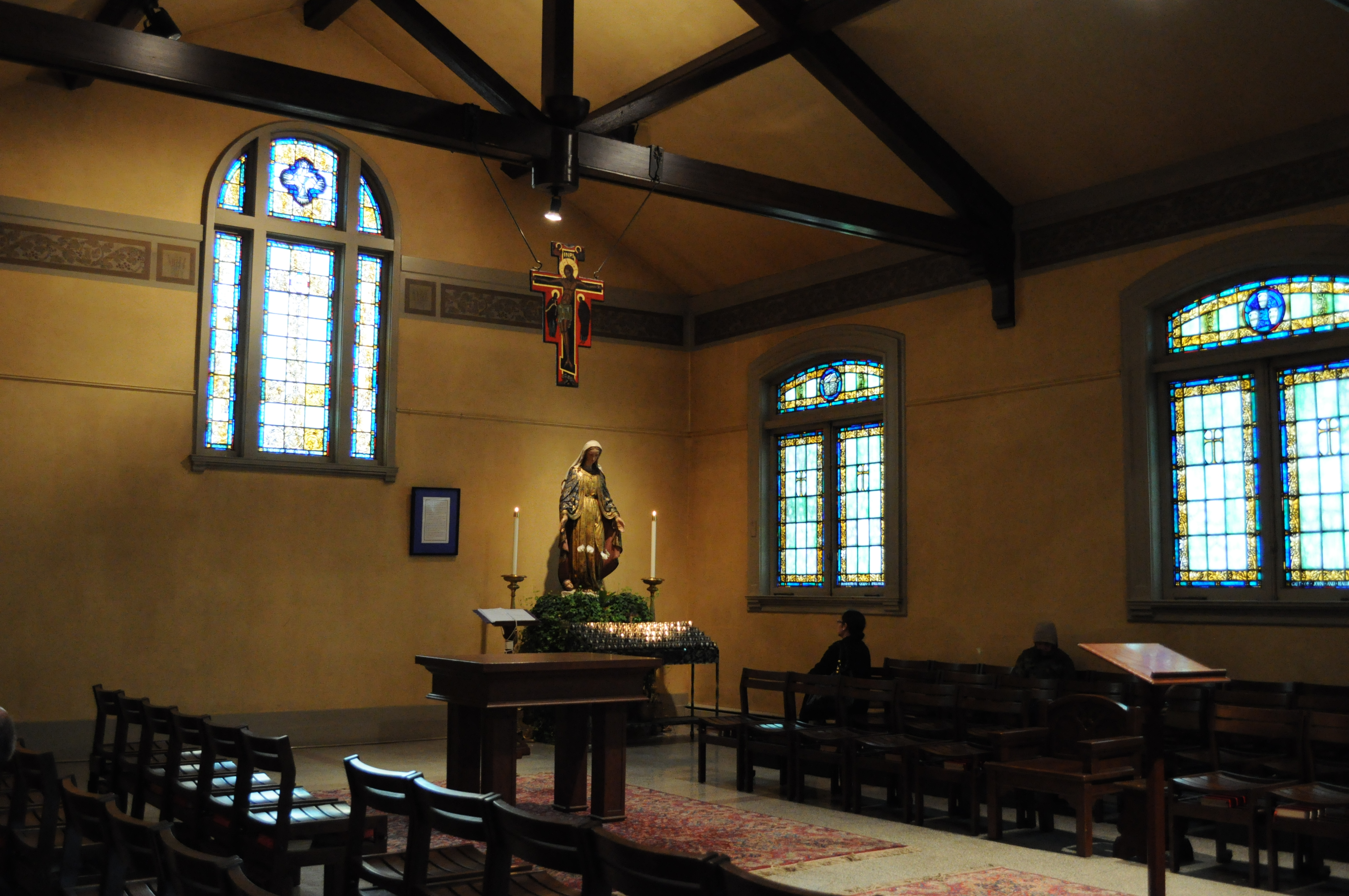
Cathedral chapel

The cathedral chapel is home to an altarpiece by Florentine artist Neri di Bicci, dating to 1456.

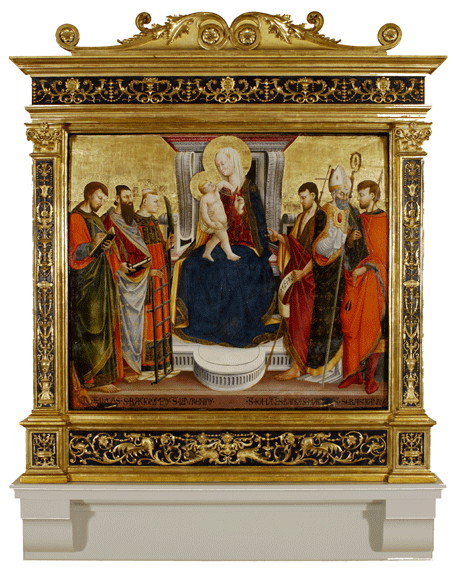
Neri di Bicci altarpiece in the cathedral chapel

It represents the Madonna and Child surrounded by six saints including St. Luke, the physician (with an ox), St. Bartholomew (with the knife used to flay him), St. Lawrence, the Deacon (with the grill on which he was martyred and a palm signifying a martyr's victory), St. John the Baptist (who in the painting is depicted proclaiming “Ecce Agnus Dei,” “Behold the Lamb of God”), St. Martin, 4th century Bishop of Tours, and St. Sebastian, Roman martyr put to death by arrows. This subject, common in Renaissance art, is known as a sacra conversazione, a “holy conversation,” as saints of many different times and places are imagined in “conversation” with Mary and Jesus. The painting underwent a major restoration in 2005 at the Seattle Art Museum, where it was featured as the centerpiece of an exhibit on devotional art of the Renaissance. The original provenance of the painting, and how it came to St. James Cathedral, is unknown, although it once hung in the cathedral's baptistery (now the Reconciliation Chapel) until it was moved to the cathedral chapel in 1950.

== Priests ==
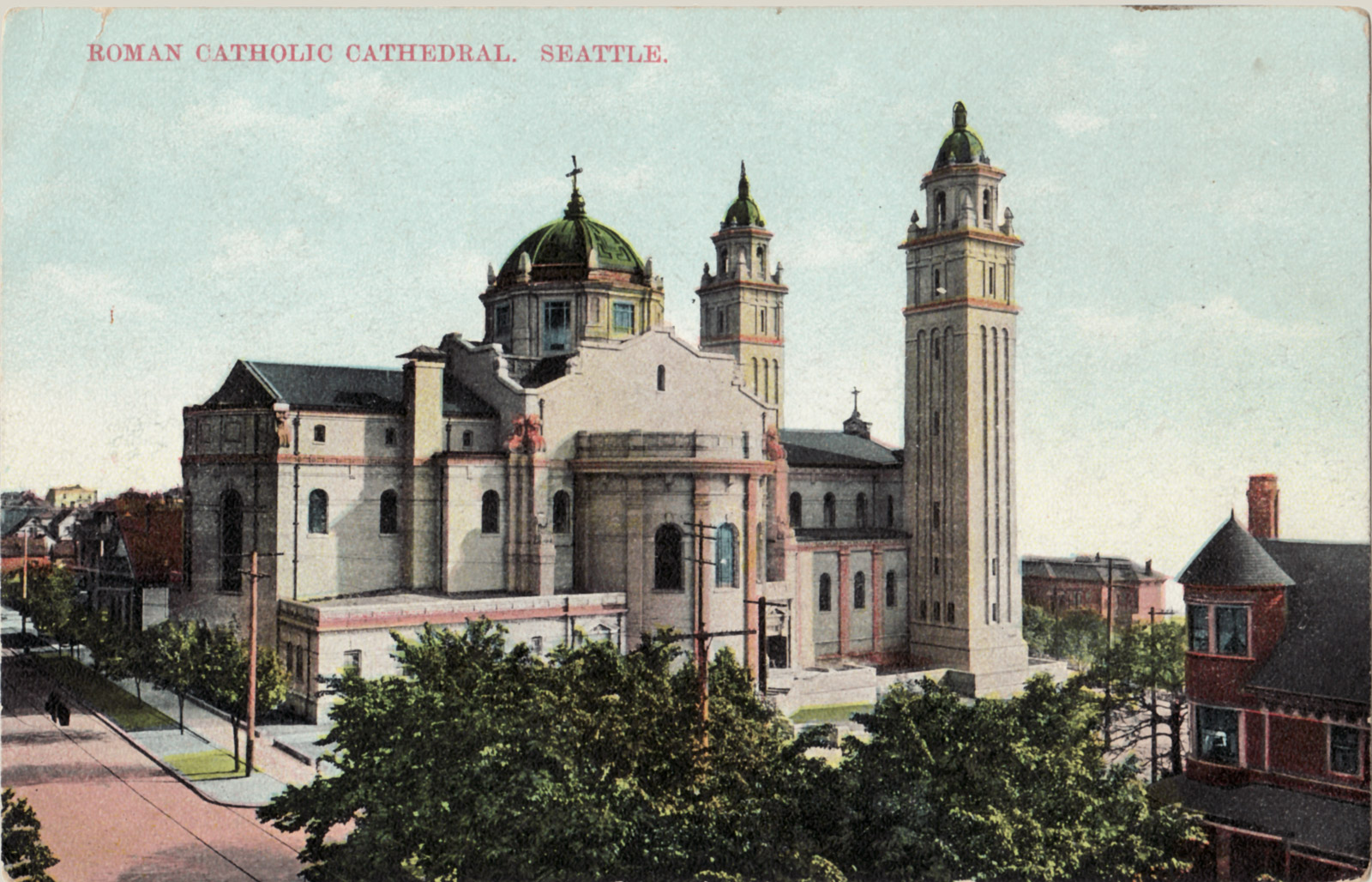
Original view of the cathedral prior to the dome collapse, as seen from the northeast

1906–1910 – Monsignor Daniel A. Hanly
1910–1919 – Monsignor William J. Noonan
1919–1935 – Monsignor James G. Stafford
1935–1943 – Father William Henry O'Neill
1943–1954 – Father John Gallagher
1955–1973 – Bishop Thomas E. Gill
1973–1988 – Father William E. Gallagher
1988–2025 – Very Rev. Michael G. Ryan
2025–present - Father Gary F. Lazzeroni

== See also ==
- List of Catholic cathedrals in the United States
- List of cathedrals in the United States
