= Stuart Long =

American boxer and Catholic priest (1963–2014)

The Reverend Stuart Long
- Church: Catholic Church; Latin Church
- Diocese: Helena

Orders
- Ordination: December 14, 2007 by George Leo Thomas

Personal details
- Born: July 26, 1963 Seattle, Washington, U.S.
- Died: June 9, 2014 (aged 50) Helena, Montana, U.S.
- Buried: Resurrection Cemetery, Lewis and Clark County, Montana, U.S.
- Education: Carroll College; Franciscan University of Steubenville

Stuart Ignatius Long (July 26, 1963 – June 9, 2014) was an American boxer and Catholic priest who developed a rare progressive muscle disorder. He was portrayed by Mark Wahlberg in the 2022 biopic Father Stu.

== Early life and education ==
Stuart Ignatius Long was born in Seattle on July 26, 1963, to William "Bill" Long and Kathleen (Kindrick) Long. While he was a child, his parents moved back to their hometown of Helena, Montana. Long had a younger brother, Stephen, who died of meningococcus at age four, and a sister, Amy. Long graduated from Capital High School in Helena in 1981, where he played football and wrestled.

Long attended Carroll College, a private Catholic college in Helena. He played football for two years and began boxing. In 1985, Long won the Golden Gloves heavyweight title for the state of Montana, and he won runner-up in 1986. Long graduated from Carroll in 1986, with a degree in English literature and writing.

== Conversion and priesthood ==
Long experienced a religious conversion after a near-death motorcycle accident in 1992. A car struck him, and then another ran over him. He had brain swelling and was not expected to survive, but recovered.

In order to marry his Catholic girlfriend, Long agreed to getting himself baptized as a Catholic, and was baptized at the Easter Vigil in 1994. However, Long felt a call to the priesthood at this time. He decided to forgo the marriage. To test whether priesthood was indeed his true calling, Long taught for three years at Bishop Alemany High School, a Catholic school in Mission Hills, California. Following this, in 1997, Long gave away most of his possessions and began considering religious life with the Franciscan Friars of the Renewal in New York. He was sent to the Franciscan University of Steubenville, where he earned a master's degree in philosophy. However, after two years, the Franciscans encouraged Long to consider diocesan priesthood, and he was accepted as a seminarian by Helena bishop Robert C. Morlino, who sent him to Mt. Angel Seminary.

During his time at the seminary, Long experienced some difficulty walking, which doctors initially believed to be a treatable case of polymyositis. However, he was eventually diagnosed with inclusion body myositis, a rare progressive muscle disorder similar to muscular dystrophy. Long became despondent, but later developed a determination to live the faith with the time he had left. Long was ordained a transitional deacon in 2006, but seminary formators had doubts about whether he could fulfill his duties as a priest, and considered making him a permanent deacon instead. During this time, Long visited the Sanctuary of Our Lady of Lourdes, believing that the Virgin Mary would miraculously heal him. When he was not healed, Long was devastated and felt abandoned, but after visiting the grotto a second time, he felt a profound peace. According to a close friend, while visiting Notre Dame Cathedral, Long had a mystical encounter with Joan of Arc, after which he felt he was being called to carry his disease for Christ.

After returning home from the pilgrimage to France, Long learned that Bishop George Leo Thomas of the Diocese of Helena had decided to ordain him. Thomas said he spent one or two weeks agonizing over the decision, saying, "I just kept begging the Lord for direction. I kept hearing the same message over and over again: 'There is power in suffering, move him forward.'" Long was ordained a priest on December 14, 2007, at the Cathedral of Saint Helena. A friend summarized Long's remarks at his ordination as "I stand before you as a broken man. Barring a miracle, I'm going to die from this disease, but I carry it for the cross of Christ, and we can all carry our crosses."

Long's first assignment as a priest was to Little Flower Parish on the Blackfeet Reservation in Browning, Montana. Long was popular there, but had to be transferred to another parish after a year due to difficulty with the church's stairs. In 2010, he moved to a long-term care facility in Helena, where he continued ministry as a priest, relying on others to transport him. When his condition deteriorated and he was no longer able to leave the facility, people would come to visit him there instead. As he grew weaker, friends assisted Long to celebrate Mass by guiding his fingers to touch the right items. His parents went through RCIA and were received into the Catholic Church, and many of the healthcare workers at the care facility converted to Catholicism. Long was also a member of the Knights of Columbus.

Long died on June 9, 2014, in Helena. He was buried at Resurrection Cemetery in Lewis and Clark County, Montana.

== In popular culture ==
A biopic, Father Stu, was announced in 2016, with Mark Wahlberg portraying Long, and Mel Gibson and Jacki Weaver as Long's parents, from a screenplay by David O. Russell. After Russell dropped out due to scheduling conflicts, Rosalind Ross wrote the screenplay and then made her directorial debut with the film. Wahlberg said that "Father Stu's story is a message that we can all improve, and work towards being better people, and help where we can." Long's parents and a number of friends, neighbors, parishioners, and clergy were involved in its production. The film was theatrically released on April 13, 2022, during Holy Week, and grossed $21.6 million on a budget of $4 million.
