= Raymond Hunthausen =

American prelate

His Excellency, the Most Reverend Raymond Gerhardt Hunthausen
- Archbishop of Seattle
- Archdiocese: Seattle
- Appointed: February 25, 1975
- Term ended: August 21, 1991
- Predecessor: Thomas Arthur Connolly
- Successor: Thomas Joseph Murphy
- Previous post: Bishop of Helena (1962–1975)

Orders
- Ordination: June 1, 1946 by Joseph Michael Gilmore
- Consecration: August 30, 1962 by Egidio Vagnozzi, Bernard Joseph Topel, and William Joseph Condon

Personal details
- Born: August 21, 1921 Anaconda, Montana, U.S.
- Died: July 22, 2018 (aged 96) Helena, Montana, U.S.
- Buried: St. James Cathedral Crypt; Seattle, Washington
- Education: Carroll College; University of Notre Dame; St. Edward Seminary
- Motto: Thy will be done

Styles of Raymond Gerhardt Hunthausen
- Reference style: His Excellency; The Most Reverend
- Spoken style: Your Excellency
- Religious style: Archbishop

Ordination history of Raymond Hunthausen
History
Episcopal consecration
- Consecrated by: Egidio Vagnozzi
- Date: August 30, 1962
Episcopal succession
Bishops consecrated by Raymond Hunthausen as principal consecrator
- William S. Skylstad: May 12, 1977
- Lawrence Welsh: December 14, 1978

Raymond Gerhardt "Dutch" Hunthausen (August 21, 1921 – July 22, 2018) was an American Catholic prelate who served as Bishop of Helena from 1962 to 1975 and as Archbishop of Seattle from 1975 to 1991.

== Biography ==
=== Early life and education ===
The oldest of seven children, Raymond Hunthausen was born on August 21, 1921, in Anaconda, Montana, to Anthony Gerhardt and Edna Marie (née Tuchscherer) Hunthausen. His parents owned and operated a local grocery store. He grew up helping with the grocery business and working in the Tuchscherer brewery. Nicknamed "Dutch", Hunthausen received his early education from the Ursuline nuns at the parochial school, and excelled both academically and athletically during high school.

Hunthausen attended Carroll College in Helena, Montana, majoring in chemistry and graduating cum laude in 1943. He considered pursuing a career as a chemical engineer or as a fighter pilot for the United States Air Force. However, he was persuaded by Reverend Bernard Topel, his spiritual director and mathematics professor at Carroll, to enter the priesthood. Hunthausen began his studies at St. Edward Seminary in Kenmore, Washington, in 1943.

=== Priesthood ===
Hunthausen was ordained a priest for the Diocese of Helena by Bishop Joseph Gilmore on June 1, 1946, in Helena. He returned to Carroll College, where he served as a professor of chemistry (1946–57) and a football and basketball coach (1953–57). In 1953 he earned a master's degree in chemistry from the University of Notre Dame in Indiana. Hunthausen served as president of Carroll College from 1957 to 1962. The Vatican named him a domestic prelate in 1958.

=== Bishop of Helena ===
On July 8, 1962, Hunthausen was appointed the sixth bishop of Helena by Pope John XXIII. He received his episcopal consecration at the Cathedral of Saint Helena in Helena on August 30, 1962, from Archbishop Egidio Vagnozzi, with Bishops Bernard Topel and William Condon serving as co-consecrators. As bishop of Helena, Hunthausen was a council father at all four sessions of the Second Vatican Council in Rome. He was the newest and youngest American bishop at the start of the council.

Starting in 1976, Hunthausen worked with Call to Action and sought to implement their program. His tenure as bishop was marked by increased lay involvement in church matters, the establishment of a mission in Guatemala, the closure of several Catholic elementary and high schools, and the strengthening of religious education programs.

=== Archbishop of Seattle ===
Hunthausen was appointed archbishop of Seattle by Pope Paul VI in 1975. In 1982, Hunthausen withheld half of his federal income tax to protest the stockpiling of nuclear weapons and the Trident missile program, which had a base in Puget Sound. In a speech, he said, "Trident is the Auschwitz of Puget Sound." This tax resistance prompted the U.S. Internal Revenue Service to garnish his wages.

==== Church investigation ====
As a result of the complaints surrounding Hunthausen's alleged deviations from Church doctrine, in 1983 the Vatican authorized Cardinal Joseph Ratzinger, prefect of the Congregation for the Doctrine of the Faith, to launch an investigation. Archbishop James A. Hickey of Washington was named apostolic visitor to the archdiocese. Hickey's delegation met with Hunthausen and others to investigate his administrative and pastoral practices. The investigation concluded that Hunthausen had exercised "weak doctrinal leadership" in a number of areas, including allowing children to receive the sacrament of Communion without first having received the sacrament of penance.

Thereafter, Fr Donald Wuerl was controversially named an auxiliary bishop with special powers. Thomas Murphy, Bishop of Great Falls–Billings, was appointed coadjutor bishop in 1987. According to Thomas Bokenkotter,

"A resolution of the affair was finally announced by the Vatican in April after it accepted the report of a commission that recommended that Hunthausen's authority be restored and a coadjutor bishop be appointed. Hunthausen stoutly maintains that his archdiocese has remained fundamentally the same and was never in violation of Vatican doctrine; nor has he had to alter the general direction of his ministry or compromise his liberal beliefs."

Hunthausen is remembered most for his support of the poor and disenfranchised. He was also an advocate for the youth and encouraged better catechesis in Catholic parishes and Catholic parochial schools despite waning enrollment. In 1985, he helped establish the Institute for Theological Studies at Seattle University, which in 1996 evolved into the School of Theology and Ministry.

=== Retirement and legacy ===
On August 21, 1991, Pope John Paul II accepted Hunthausen's resignation as Archbishop of Seattle, five years before the normal episcopal retirement age of 75. He then moved to Helena to live with his brother, Jack Hunthausen. Raymond continued to hear confessions once a week in East Helena, Montana, and led retreats in the Diocese of Helena.

On July 22, 2018, Hunthausen died in his home in Helena at age 96. He was the second archbishop to be interred in the crypt at St. James Cathedral.

== Awards ==
- The 1982 Thomas Merton Award by the Thomas Merton Center for Peace and Justice
- Election to the National Association of Intercollegiate Athletics Collegiate Hall of Fame

== Head coaching record ==
=== Football ===
Year	Team	Overall	Conference	Standing	Bowl/playoffs
Carroll Fighting Saints (Montana Collegiate Conference) (1953–1956)
1953	Carroll	5–2–1	4–0	1st	
1954	Carroll	5–2–1	4–0	1st	
1955	Carroll	4–4	3–1	2nd	
1956	Carroll	6–2	4–0	1st	
Carroll:		20–10–2	15–1		
Total:					
National championship Conference title Conference division title or championship game berth

=== Basketball ===
Record table
Season	Team	Overall	Conference	Standing	Postseason
Carroll Fighting Saints (Montana Collegiate Conference) (1953–1957)
1953–54	Carroll	22–4	10–0	1st	
1954–55	Carroll	15–7	8–2		
1955–56	Carroll	12–11	8–2	1st	
1956–57	Carroll	5–17	3–7		
Carroll:		56–39	29–11		
Total:		56–39			
National champion Postseason invitational champion Conference regular season champion Conference regular season and conference tournament champion Division regular season champion Division regular season and conference tournament champion Conference tournament champion

Catholic Church titles
Preceded by Joseph Michael Gilmore	Bishop of Helena; 1962–1975	Succeeded by Elden Francis Curtiss
Preceded by Thomas Arthur Connolly	Archbishop of Seattle; 1975–1991	Succeeded by Thomas Joseph Murphy
