= William S. Skylstad =

American Roman Catholic Bishop (born 1934)

His Excellency, The Most Reverend William Stephen Skylstad
- Bishop Emeritus of Spokane
- Diocese: Spokane
- Appointed: April 17, 1990
- Installed: April 27, 1990
- Retired: June 30, 2010
- Predecessor: Lawrence Welsh
- Successor: Blase J. Cupich
- Previous post: Bishop of Yakima (1977-1990)

Orders
- Ordination: May 21, 1960 by Egidio Vagnozzi
- Consecration: May 12, 1977 by Raymond Hunthausen, Bernard Joseph Topel, and Bernard Francis Law

Personal details
- Born: March 2, 1934 (age 92) Methow, Washington
- Education: Pontifical College Josephinum; Washington State University; Gonzaga University

Styles of William Stephen Skylstad
- Reference style: His Excellency; The Most Reverend
- Spoken style: Your Excellency
- Religious style: Bishop

William Stephen Skylstad (born March 2, 1934) is an American prelate of the Roman Catholic Church. He served as bishop of the Diocese of Spokane in Washington State from 1990 to 2010. He previously served as the bishop of the Diocese of Yakima in Washington State from 1977 to 1990.

Skylstad is a former president of the United States Conference of Catholic Bishops (USCCB). He was appointed as apostolic administrator of the Diocese of Baker in Oregon in 2011, serving there until 2012.

== Biography ==
=== Early life ===
The oldest of six children, William Skylstad was born in Omak, Washington on March 2, 1934, delivered on a table in the family garage. A Norwegian immigrant, his father Stephen Skylstad was an apple farmer. Stephen was a Lutheran, but his wife (Reneldes Elizabeth Danzl-Skylstad) was a Catholic from Minnesota.

At age 14, having decided to enter the Catholic priesthood, William Skylstad left home to attend the Pontifical College Josephinum in Worthington, Ohio.

=== Priesthood ===
On May 21, 1960, Skylstad was ordained a priest by Archbishop Egidio Vagnozzi at the Josephinum for the Diocese of Spokane. That same year, Skylstad attended Washington State University in Pullman, Washington, and served as an assistant pastor at a parish in that town.

In 1960, Skylstad began teaching at Mater Cleri, a minor seminary in Colbert, Washington, evaluating student fitness for the priesthood. He entered Gonzaga University in Spokane, Washington, in 1961, graduating in 1964. In 1968, Skylstad was appointed rector at the Mater Cleri. That same year, he became the pastor of St. Joseph Parish in Colbert. He also sat on a personnel board that counseled the bishop on problem priests. Skylstad continued serving at Mater Cleri and St. Joseph until 1974.

In 1974 Skylstad became pastor at Assumption of the Blessed Virgin Mary Parish in Spokane. In 1976, he left the parish to serve as chancellor of the diocese.

=== Bishop of Yakima ===
On February 22, 1977, Pope Paul VI appointed Skylstad as bishop of Yakima; he was consecrated on May 12, 1977, by Archbishop Raymond Hunthausen at Holy Family Church in Yakima, Washington. His co-consecrators were Bishop Bernard Topel and Bishop Bernard Law.

=== Bishop of Spokane ===
On April 17, 1990, Pope John Paul II appointed Skylstad as the fifth bishop of Spokane; his installation was on April 27, 1990. After having served as the vice president of the United States Conference of Catholic Bishops (USCCB) since 2001, Skylstad was elected to a three-year term as USCCB president on November 15, 2004.

In December 2004, the diocese declared Chapter 11 Bankruptcy to manage the claims of people credibly abused by its priests. As part of its bankruptcy agreement, the diocese agreed to pay at least $48 million to the victims as compensation. The money for the settlement was to come from insurance companies, the sale of church property, contributions from Catholic groups and from the diocese's parishes. In April 2007, four prominent donors to the diocese wrote private letters to Skylstad asking him to resign, terming the sexual abuse settlement he approved as a "complete disaster". Skylstad expressed disappointment that the Spokesman-Review in Spokane had published the contents of private letters.

=== Retirement ===
On June 30, 2010, Pope Benedict XVI accepted Skystad's letter of resignation as bishop of Spokane.In 2016, Catholic Charities USA named Skylstad as one of its two volunteers of the year. They cited his counseling and spiritual guidance to clients at the House of Charity in Spokane. Skylstad also worked to connect Catholic Charities of Spokane clients needing assistance.

== Controversies ==
=== O'Donnell case ===
Court records in 2005 showed that Skylstad during the 1970s, when was still a priest, consistently delayed acting response to sexual abuse accusations against Reverend Patrick O'Donnell, a priest with a history of inappropriate behavior with teenage boys. The diocese personal board removed O'Donnell from his current parish due to complaints from the pastor. The board then reassigned O'Donnell to the Assumption of the Blessed Virgin Mary Parish in Spokane, where Skylstad was the pastor.

After O'Donnell started working at Assumption, Rita Flynn, a parishioner started hearing stories from her son about O'Donnell behaving inappropriately with boys. She complained about O'Donnell twice to Skylstad, who did nothing. Finally, Flynn's husband told Skylstad he would expose O'Donnell's behavior to the entire parish if the diocese did not remove him. At that point, the diocese sent O'Donnell to Seattle for treatment. He later admitted to abusing 11 boys at the parish. When asked about O'Donnell in 2005 in a legal deposition, Skylstad said he could not remember meeting with the Flynns or their accusations against O'Donnell.

=== Abuse accusation ===
On March 8, 2006, a woman accused Skylstad of having sexually abused her as a minor from December 1961 to December 1963 at both St. Joseph and Gonzaga University. The accusation was made as part of the diocesan bankruptcy agreement. He completely denied the accusations. On June 12, Skylstad's lawyer said that an investigation he conducted had found no evidence to back the accuser's claim.

=== Amnesty International Abortion Policy change ===
In 2007, while Skystad was USCCB president, Amnesty International (AI) considered abandoning its neutral stance on abortion rights for women in favor of a new policy considering abortion as an international human right under certain circumstances. The USCCB made several appeals to AI to remain neutral on abortion. In April 2007, the AI international leadership adopted the new abortion policy. On July 2, 2007, the USCCB renewed its earlier appeals to AI. In a statement signed by Skylstad, the USCCB said that AI:

'"trivializes the harm done by abortion. AI's new policy appears to apply to every stage of pregnancy and has already led AI-USA to oppose laws against the killing of partially delivered children. Similarly, the policy of advancing access to abortion to preserve women's 'health,' a word left undefined by AI, has not confined the practice to narrow circumstances, but in American law has led to abortion on demand."

In August 2007, the AI International Council affirmed the new abortion policy. In an August 23rd statement, Skylstad called the new AI position divisive and an affront to "people in many nations, cultures and religions who share a consistent commitment to all human rights".

=== "Bloody Mary" controversy ===
In 2006, Skylstad condemned the "Bloody Mary" episode of the TV series South Park. In a letter to Viacom's president and CEO, Tom Freston, Skylstad said that the Comedy Central channel, owned by ViacomCBS, had shown "extreme insensitivity" in airing the episode, which featured a derisive statue of the Virgin Mary. When South Park was rerun later in the United States, Viacom did not air the "Bloody Mary" episode.

=== Amateur Radio ===
Skylstad was also an active ham radio operator with the callsign K7KNL. In Yakima he would work the local 2m repeaters as Bill, with many users not realizing that he was the bishop.

=== See also ===
- Catholic Church hierarchy
- Catholic Church in the United States
- Historical list of the Catholic bishops of the United States
- List of Catholic bishops of the United States
- Lists of patriarchs, archbishops, and bishops

== Episcopal succession ==
Catholic Church titles
Preceded by Wilton D. Gregory	President of the United States Conference of Catholic Bishops; 2004–2007	Succeeded by Francis George
Preceded by Lawrence Welsh	Bishop of Spokane; 1990–2010	Succeeded by Blase J. Cupich
Preceded by Nicolas Eugene Walsh	Bishop of Yakima; 1977–1990	Succeeded by Francis George
