= Šljivančanin =

Šljivančanin is a South Slavic surname.

Notable people with this surname include:

- Bojan Šljivančanin (born 1982), retired Montenegrin footballer
- Jovan Šljivančanin (born 1999), Serbian basketball player
- Mlađen Šljivančanin (born 1985), retired Serbian basketball player
- Slobodan Šljivančanin (born 1972), retired Montenegrin basketball player
- Veselin Šljivančanin (born 1953), Yugoslav colonel and convicted war criminal
