= Joseph Michael Gilmore =

American prelate (1893–1962)

His Excellency, The Most Reverend Joseph Michael Gilmore
- Bishop of Helena
- See: Diocese of Helena
- In office: 1936–1962
- Predecessor: Ralph Leo Hayes
- Successor: Raymond Gerhardt Hunthausen

Orders
- Ordination: July 25, 1915 by Basilio Pompilj
- Consecration: February 19, 1936 by Archbishop Amleto Giovanni Cicognani

Personal details
- Born: March 23, 1893 New York City, New York, US
- Died: April 2, 1962 (aged 69) San Francisco, California, US
- Denomination: Roman Catholic
- Parents: John Joseph and Mary Teresa (née Hanrahan) Gilmore
- Education: Loras College; Urban College of Propaganda
- Motto: Quaerite regnum Dei (Seek the kingdom of God)

Joseph Michael Gilmore (March 23, 1893 – April 2, 1962) was an American prelate of the Roman Catholic Church. He served as bishop of the Diocese of Helena in Montana from 1936 until his death in 1962.

== Biography ==
Joseph Gilmore was born in New York City on March 23, 1893, to John Joseph and Mary Teresa (née Hanrahan) Gilmore, an Irish family. When Joseph was five, in 1898, his family moved to Anaconda, Montana, where his father John worked in the mining industry.

Joseph Gilmore studied at Loras College in Dubuque, Iowa, obtaining a Bachelor of Arts degree in 1911. He continued his studies at the Urban College of Propaganda in Rome, earning a Doctor of Sacred Theology degree in 1915.

=== Priesthood ===
While in Rome, Gilmore was ordained to the priesthood by Cardinal Basilio Pompilj for the Diocese of Helena on July 25, 1915. Following his return to Montana, Gilmore served as a professor at Carroll College in Helena. In 1920, he became pastor of St. Teresa's Parish in Whitehall, Montana. He served as pastor of St. Helena's Parish in Butte, Montana, from 1925 to 1927. He next served as chancellor of the diocese from 1927 to 1936.

=== Bishop of Helena ===
On December 9, 1935, Gilmore was appointed the fifth bishop of Helena by Pope Pius XI. He received his episcopal consecration at the Cathedral of Saint Helena in Helena on February 19, 1936, from Archbishop Amleto Giovanni Cicognani, with Bishops Edwin O'Hara and Joseph McGrath serving as co-consecrators. During his 26-year-long tenure, Gilmore presided over a period of great growth for the diocese. In addition to the material development, he developed programs to foster vocations, help resettle refugees from World War II, retrain unskilled workers, aid in adoptions, and promote the lay apostolate. The Vatican named Gilmore an assistant at the pontifical throne in 1959.

At age 69, Joseph Gilmore died unexpectedly on April 2, 1962, in San Francisco, California, while attending the installation of Archbishop Joseph McGucken.

Catholic Church titles
Preceded by Ralph Leo Hayes	Bishop of Helena; 1936–1962	Succeeded by Raymond Gerhardt Hunthausen
