= Ralph Leo Hayes =

American prelate

His Excellency, The Most Reverend Ralph Leo Hayes S.T.D
- Bishop of Davenport; Titular Bishop of Naraggara.
- Appointed: November 16, 1944
- In office: January 11, 1945 – October 20, 1966
- Predecessor: Henry Patrick Rohlman
- Successor: Gerald Francis O'Keefe
- Previous posts: Bishop of Helena (1933 to 1935); Rector of the Pontifical North American College (1935 to 1940); Titular Bishop of Hieropolis

Orders
- Ordination: September 19, 1909 by Pietro Respighi
- Consecration: September 21, 1933 by Hugh Charles Boyle

Personal details
- Born: September 21, 1884 Pittsburgh, Pennsylvania, US
- Died: July 5, 1970 (aged 85) Davenport, Iowa, US
- Education: Pontifical North American College; University of the Congregation of Propagation of the Faith
- Motto: Opere et veritate (In action and truth)

Ralph Leo Hayes S.T.D. (September 21, 1884 – July 5, 1970) was an American prelate of the Roman Catholic Church. He served as the fourth bishop of the Diocese of Helena in Montana from 1933 to 1935, and as the fifth bishop of the Diocese of Davenport in Iowa from 1944 to 1966.

Between his two episcopal appointments, Hayes served as the rector of the Pontifical North American College in Rome from 1935 to 1944.

== Biography ==
=== Early life ===
Ralph Hayes was born on September 21, 1884, in Pittsburgh, Pennsylvania, to Patrick Nagle and Mary Jane (O’Donnell) Hayes. He received his high school and college education at Holy Ghost College in Pittsburgh. He played on the college football, basketball, and baseball teams and in the summer on a semi-professional baseball team. Deciding to become a priest, Hayes studied at the Pontifical North American College and the University of the Congregation of Propagation of the Faith, both in Rome.

=== Priesthood ===
Hayes was ordained into the priesthood in Rome by Cardinal Pietro Respighi for the Diocese of Pittsburgh on September 19, 1909. He initially served in a parish before being appointed to the diocesan mission band. He later became the band director. From 1917 to 1925, Hayes served as superintendent of schools for the diocese. He then spent seven years as pastor of St. Catherine of Siena Parish in Pittsburgh, doing what he called ‘’real priest’s work.”

=== Bishop of Helena ===
On June 23, 1933, Pope Pius XI appointed Hayes as the fourth bishop of Helena. He was consecrated bishop at the Cathedral of Saint Paul in Pittsburgh on September 21, 1933, by Bishop Hugh Boyle. The principal co-consecrators were Bishops James Griffin and Alphonse Smith. Both co-consecrators were classmates of his in Rome. Hayes served the diocese as its bishop for two years.

=== Rector of Pontifical North American College ===
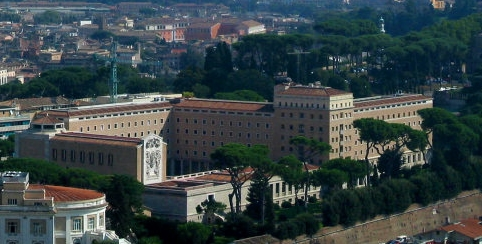
Pontifical North American College, Rome, Italy (2010)

On October 26, 1935, Pius XI appointed Hayes as titular bishop of Hieropolis and rector of the North American College.

Hayes was an admirer of the Fascist regime in Italy and its leader, Benito Mussolini. In a speech in Pennsylvania in October 1936, Hayes said of Mussolini that "...a true Italian patriot could have done neither more or better." Hayes also accused the American media of spreading falsehoods about Mussolini and praised the Italian government for its support of the Catholic Church. Hayes later received the Commander of the Order of the Crown award from the Government of Italy.

With the onset of World War II, Pope Pius XII in 1940 closed the North American College along with the other national seminaries in Rome. Hayes then returned to Pittsburgh, where he supervised the financial and business matters relating to the college. He also assisted Bishop Boyle in his episcopal responsibilities.

=== Bishop of Davenport ===
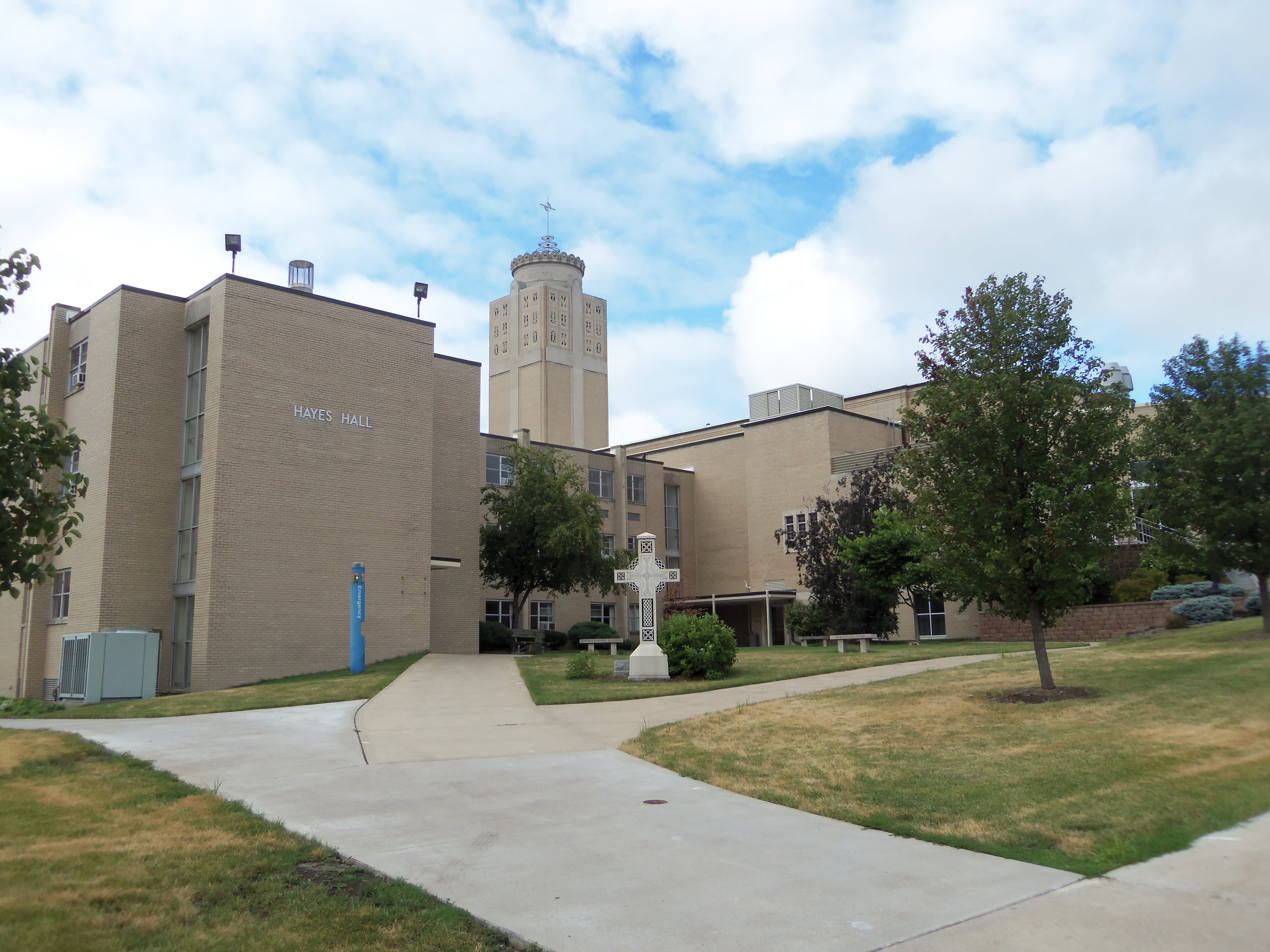
Hayes Hall (left) and Christ the King Chapel, St. Ambrose University, Davenport, Iowa (2013)

On November 16, 1944, Pope Pius XII appointed Hayes as fifth bishop of Davenport. He was installed in Sacred Heart Cathedral in Davenport on January 11, 1945. During his 22 years in Davenport, Hayes expanded school facilities across the diocese:

- Muscatine Central Catholic High School (now closed) in Muscatine (1953)
- Notre Dame High School in Burlington (1957)
- Regina High School in Iowa City (1958)
- Assumption High School in Davenport (1958)
- Aquinas High School (now Holy Trinity) in Fort Madison (1959)
- Walsh High School (now closed) in Ottumwa (1960)
- Cardinal Stritch High School (now closed) in Keokuk (1965)

Many of these communities had been served by parish high schools, while Davenport's new high school was a merger of St. Ambrose and Immaculate Conception academies. New buildings were also added at St. Ambrose, Marycrest and Mt. St. Claire Colleges. The four bishops of Iowa built Mt. St. Bernard's Seminary in Dubuque.

Enrollment in the Catholic schools reached their highest enrollments during Hayes’ episcopate. Elementary school enrollment reached its highest mark in 1960 at 12,074. The high schools reached their highest mark in 1965 with 4,129 students.

A four-day conference sponsored by the National Catholic Welfare Council was held in Davenport in 1949. It focused on the themes of industry, education and rural life. From 1954 to 1956, Hayes served as the president of the National Catholic Rural Life Conference. Its national convention was held in Davenport in 1956. Pius XII appointed Hayes as assistant at the pontifical throne on April 30, 1958.

Hayes established the Papal Volunteers of Latin America in the diocese in February 1961 in response to a plea from Pope John XXIII. Hayes sent missionaries from the diocese to Cuernavaca, Mexico, and Ponce, Puerto Rico. Hayes attended all four sessions of the Second Vatican Council in Rome during the early 1960s; he was the oldest American bishop in attendance.

=== Retirement and legacy ===
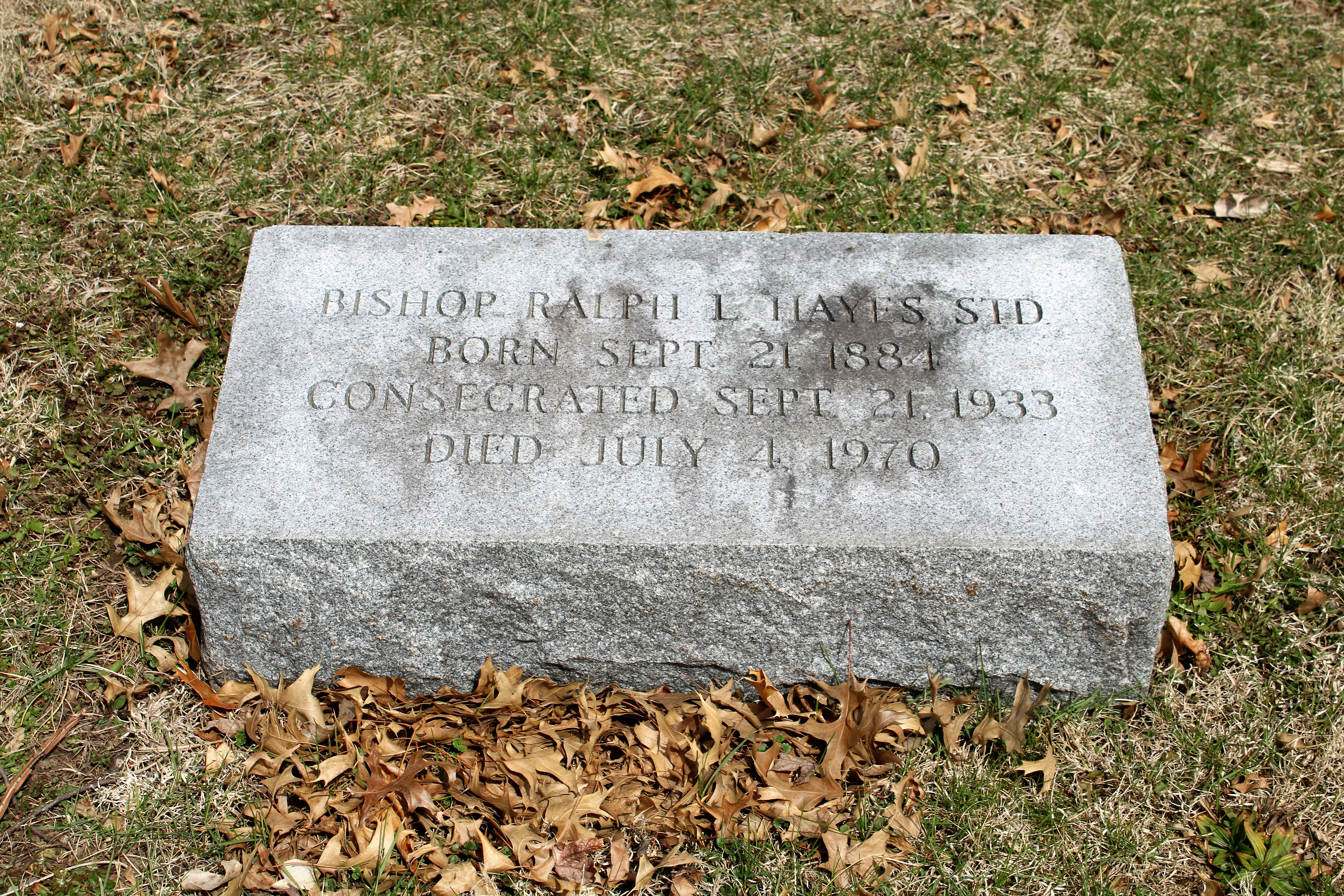
Bishop Hayes' grave, Mount Calvary Cemetery, Davenport, Iowa (2022)

On his 82nd birthday, September 21, 1966, Hayes submitted his resignation as bishop of Davenport to the Vatican in compliance with the Second Vatican Council decree Christus Dominus. His resignation was the first such resignation accepted by Pope Paul VI. On October 20, 1966, the pope accepted Hayes' resignation and named him as titular bishop of Naraggara.

After his retirement, Hayes moved to the Kahl Home, a nursing home in Davenport. Ralph Hayes died in Davenport on July 7, 1970, at age 85. Following his funeral in Sacred Heart Cathedral, Hayes was interred in the Bishop's Circle of Mt. Calvary Cemetery in Davenport.

The following were named in honor of Hayes:

- Hayes Hall at St. Ambrose University
- Bishop Hayes School in Muscatine, Iowa

Catholic Church titles
Preceded by George Joseph Finnigan	Bishop of Helena; 1933–1935	Succeeded by Joseph Michael Gilmore
Academic offices
Preceded by Eugene S. Burke	Rector of the Pontifical North American College; 1935–1944	Succeeded by J. Gerald Kealy
Catholic Church titles
Preceded by Henry Rohlman	Bishop of Davenport; 1944–1966	Succeeded by Gerald Francis O'Keefe
