= Winton, Wyoming =

- Ghost town
- Location within Wyoming
- Coordinates: 41°44′50″N 109°10′02″W
- Country: United States
- State: Wyoming
- County: Sweetwater
- Elevation: 6,966 ft (2,123 m)
- GNIS feature ID: 1597546

Winton is a ghost town in Sweetwater County, Wyoming, United States. Winton was 5 miles (8.0 km) north-northeast of Rock Springs. Winton is sometimes referred to as Megeath. Megeath Coal Company owned a Post Office named Winton. Union Pacific bought out Megeath and changed the name to Winton.

== Notable people ==
Lawrence Welsh, the fourth Bishop of the Roman Catholic Diocese of Spokane, was born in Winton.
