= 1989 Helena train wreck =

Train accident in Montana, U.S.

Coordinates: 46.6066°N 112.041408°W

Helena Train Wreck

Details
- Date: February 2, 1989; 4:48 AM
- Location: Helena, Montana
- Country: US
- Operator: Montana Rail Link
- Service: 121
- Cause: Failure of train crew to set brakes properly.

Statistics
- Trains: 2
- Vehicles: 51
- Crew: 7
- Deaths: 0
- Injured: 2
- Damage: $6 million

The Helena Train Wreck occurred in the early morning on February 2, 1989, in Helena, Montana, United States, when 49 cars of a Montana Rail Link freight train that had been decoupled from their locomotives by a train crew on Mullan Pass rolled backwards down the pass, traveling nine miles back into the city of Helena and colliding with a set of "helper" locomotives at a railway crossing near the center of the community. The collision resulted in a fire and explosion that damaged Carroll College and other nearby structures, knocked out power to most of the town, and led to the evacuation of residents within an area of 2 square miles (5.2 km^{2}) due to concerns of possible toxic chemical release. The event occurred during a severe cold snap, with temperatures below −30 °F (−34 °C) that morning and with a wind chill factor of as much as −75 °F (−59 °C), which froze the water that firefighters used to attempt to extinguish the fire.

== Event ==
In the early morning of February 2, 1989, during a record cold snap, a Montana Rail Link freight train picked up three extra "helper" locomotives in Helena, Montana, to help move the train over Mullan Pass. The train then traveled west from Helena. Halfway up the pass, the lead engine developed an electrical problem that caused a loss of power (and failure of the cab heater) and at about the same time was stopped by a malfunctioning signal. The train crew then parked the train at the Austin siding, on the east side of Mullan Pass. In order to have a locomotive with working lights and heat leading, the crew uncoupled the engines from the 49-car train to switch the order of the locomotives, setting the air brakes but not the hand brakes on the cars. At about 5:30 a.m., record cold temperatures caused the air brakes to fail on the decoupled cars. The cars then rolled backwards 9 miles (14 km) downhill, uncontrolled, into Helena, crashed into a parked set of "helper" locomotives near the Benton Avenue crossing and Carroll College, caught fire, and exploded.

The explosion awakened many local residents, some of whom thought it was an earthquake. The blast caused extensive damage to Carroll College, shaking St. Charles Hall, a classroom and dormitory building, and shattering most of the windows in Guadelupe Hall, the women's dormitory. A piece of a railroad car landed in the college library, which was vacant at the time due to the early hour of the day. Other buildings damaged in Helena included the scagliola columns and other interior features of the Cathedral of St. Helena, located over 1 mile (1.6 km) away. No one was killed, but the explosion disabled electric service to much of the community, as well as to some residents outside Helena, including rolling brownouts extending as far north as Great Falls, Montana, approximately 90 miles (140 km) away. It shattered windows 1 mile (1.6 km) distant, ejected debris for blocks, and increased concerns about toxic gases spreading through the community. Neighborhoods within a radius of 2 miles (3.2 km) were evacuated.

== Weather ==
The temperature at the time of the accident was about −32 °F (−36 °C) and the resulting power outage disabled heat for a significant number of community residents. Later consequences included water damage to buildings resulting from frozen plumbing and other difficulties that necessitated expensive repairs and plagued local residences for years. The event headlined a three-minute story on winter weather on NBC News that evening. The cold snap that ran from January 30 to February 4 was ranked number 4 on the NOAA's list of Montana's Top Weather/Water/Climate events of the 20th century. The temperature remained colder than −20 °F (−29 °C) for 84 hours. A record low, −33 °F (−36 °C), occurred on February 4. Wind chill was as low as −75 °F (−59 °C). Firefighters were hampered by water freezing as they attempted to use hoses to extinguish the blaze.

== Hazardous materials ==
First responders were concerned about the potential for exposure to toxic chemicals, as they did not know at the time what materials were being transported by the freight cars. The explosion was later determined to have been caused by a tanker carrying isopropyl alcohol, which caught fire and caused an explosion in another nearby car containing hydrogen peroxide. This was deemed a hazardous materials release. The accident, particularly due to the chemical release, has been used as an example of the risks inherent in rail transportation, particularly by those assessing the risks of rail transportation of nuclear materials. This derailment was part of a 2003 study of highway and train derailment accidents by the United States Department of Energy on accident sequence and nuclear risk.
