= Bernard Joseph Topel =

American prelate (1903–1986)

His Excellency, The Most Reverend Bernard Joseph Topel
- Bishop of Spokane; Titular Bishop of Binda
- Church: Roman Catholic Church
- See: Diocese of Spokane
- In office: September 21, 1955 to April 11, 1978
- Predecessor: Charles Daniel White
- Successor: Lawrence Welsh
- Other post: Titular Bishop of Binda

Orders
- Ordination: June 7, 1927 by John Joseph Mitty
- Consecration: September 21, 1955 by Joseph Michael Gilmore

Personal details
- Born: March 31, 1903 Bozeman, Montana, U.S.
- Died: October 22, 1986 (aged 83) Spokane, Washington, U.S.
- Education: Mount St. Charles College; Grand Seminary of Montreal; Catholic University of America; Harvard University; University of Notre Dame
- Motto: Sanctificetur nomen tuum (Hallowed be thy name)

Bernard Joseph Topel (March 31, 1903 – October 22, 1986) was an American prelate of the Catholic Church. He served as bishop of the Diocese of Spokane in Washington State from 1955 to 1978.

== Biography ==
=== Early life ===
Topel was born on March 31, 1903, in Bozeman, Montana, the fourth son of Henry Albert and Mary Pauline (née Hagen) Topel. Henry Topel was a tailor who had immigrated from Germany in 1878. Mary Topel immigrated from Switzerland at age nine. Bernard Topel attended grade school in Bozeman and, after graduating from St. Charles High School in Helena, studied at Mount St. Charles College in Helena, Montana. He then studied theology at the Grand Seminary of Montreal in Montreal, Quebec. Topel then went to Washington, D.C., to enter the Catholic University of America. He earned a Master of Education there in 1927.

=== Priesthood ===
Topel was ordained to the priesthood by Bishop John Joseph Mitty for the Diocese of Helena on June 7, 1927 in Helena, Montana. After his ordination, he went to Cambridge, Massachusetts, to earn a master's degree in mathematics from Harvard University. Topel then went to the University of Notre Dame in Indiana, where he earned a doctorate.

Returning to Montana in 1934, he served at the missions in Toston and Wolf Creek. In 1937, Topel served as a faculty member teaching mathematics at the University of Notre Dame. He came back to Montana in 1939, becoming a faculty member of Mount St. Charles College, teaching mathematics and physics. He also served as vocations director for the diocese.

=== Coadjutor Bishop and Bishop of Spokane ===
On August 9, 1955, Topel was appointed coadjutor bishop of Spokane and titular bishop of Binda by Pope Pius XII. He received his episcopal consecration on September 21, 1955, from Bishop Joseph Gilmore, with Bishops Joseph Dougherty and Joseph Willging serving as co-consecrators, at the Cathedral of St. Helena in Helena. Upon the death of Bishop Charles White four days later, Topel succeeded him as the third bishop of Spokane on September 25, 1955. He was installed on October 12, 1955, at the Cathedral of Our Lady of Lourdes.

On being selected as a bishop, Topel remarked:

"I became a bishop without ever having been a pastor or working in the chancery, the common way to become a bishop. I thought I was the least prepared man to become bishop ever. But then I decided afterward I wasn't".

In 1958, Topel led a pilgrimage of Spokane Catholics to the shrines of Europe, including the Sanctuary of Our Lady of Lourdes in Lourdes, France, on the 100th anniversary of the apparitions of Our Lady of Lourdes. He began a mission program in Guatemala with the Maryknoll Fathers in 1960. Topel attended all four sessions of the Second Vatican Council in Rome between 1962 and 1965.

During his 22-year tenure, Topel established several parishes and schools, the Mater Cleri Seminary in Colbert, Washington, the Bishop White Seminary on the Gonzaga University campus in Spokane, the Immaculate Heart Retreat House in Spokane, homes for unwed mothers, and housing for the elderly.

Topel received national media coverage for his austere lifestyle. He maintained a modest residence with neither heating nor a telephone. He received most of his food from his vegetable garden. Topel donated the profits from the sale of his crosier and pectoral cross to charity, and admitted that wearing an episcopal ring made him feel "a bit out of kilter". He once declared,

"I have come to the realization that the most important thing I can do in the church, and that applies to Christians in general, is to live simply in order to give money to the poor."

=== Retirement and legacy ===
Upon reaching the mandatory retirement age of 75, Topel retired as bishop of Spokane on April 11, 1978. He served as apostolic administrator of the diocese until the appointment of his successor, Lawrence Harold Welsh. He died at St. Joseph Care Center, aged 83.

In 2004, the diocese was sued by several plaintiffs over its handling of sexual abuse allegations against Reverend Patrick G. O'Donnell, a diocese priest. Before his ordination, clergy had voiced concerns about O'Donnell's sexual attraction to boys, yet he was accepted into the diocese. In 1974, Reverend Walter Abel was O'Donnell's supervising priest. Abel believed that O'Donnell was a pedophile and told the diocesan personnel board it was essential that O'Donnell be moved quickly. At that time, Topel sent O'Donnell away for therapy. Upon his return, Topel reassigned him to a new parish where he abused more boys. Topel did not notify authorities or parishioners about O'Donnell. O'Donnell would not be exposed and suspended from the priesthood until 1986, by which time he had been assigned to several parishes.

Catholic Church titles
Preceded by Charles Daniel White	Bishop of Spokane; 1955–1978	Succeeded by Lawrence Welsh
