= Lawrence Welsh =

American prelate

His Excellency, The Most Reverend Lawrence Welsh
- Auxiliary Bishop of Saint Paul and Minneapolis; Titular Bishop of Aulon
- See: Archdiocese of Saint Paul and Minneapolis
- Appointed: November 5, 1991
- Other posts: Bishop of Spokane; 1991 to 1999; Titular Bishop of Aulon; 1991 to 1999

Orders
- Ordination: March 26, 1962 by William Tibertus McCarty
- Consecration: December 14, 1978 by Raymond Hunthausen

Personal details
- Born: February 1, 1935 Winton, Wyoming, US
- Died: January 13, 1999 (aged 63)
- Motto: To serve in love

Lawrence Harold Welsh (February 1, 1935 – January 13, 1999) was an American Catholic prelate who served as an auxiliary bishop of the Archdiocese of Saint Paul and Minneapolis from 1991 to 1999. He previously served as Bishop of Spokane from 1978 to 1989.

== Biography ==
=== Early life ===
Lawrence Welsh was born on February 1, 1935, in Winton, Wyoming. He was ordained a priest for the Diocese of Rapid City by Bishop William Tibertus McCarty on March 26, 1962, at the Cathedral of the Immaculate Conception in Rapid City, South Dakota.

=== Bishop of Spokane ===
On November 6, 1978, Pope John Paul II appointed Welsh as bishop of Spokane. He was consecrated by Archbishop Raymond Gerhardt Hunthausen on December 14, 1978.

Welsh was accused of reassigning Reverend Patrick O'Donnell to another parish after three families brought allegations of sexual abuse of children by O'Donnell to the knowledge of Bishop Welsh.

Welsh was investigated by the Spokane Police Department in 1986 on an assault allegation from Chicago. On September 9, 1986, a male sex worker claimed that Welsh, in Chicago for a Knights of Columbus convention, had picked him up and transported him to a motel. While the man was performing oral sex on Welsh, he said that Welsh "began to strangle him." During his police interview, Welsh admitted to picking up a so-called drug addict and taking him to his hotel room, supposedly for counseling. On further questioning, Welsh admitted to putting his hands all over the accuser's body. The investigation resulted in Welsh being briefly considered as a possible suspect for the Green River serial killings for which Gary Ridgway was later convicted.

On September 29, 1986, Spokane police met with Welsh and Hunthausen. At this meeting, Welsh stated that;

"...he did not feel he did anything violent in the course of the sex act and that if he had it would have been as an outlet for frustrations that had built up within him."

Welsh, Hunthausen, and the police detectives agreed that Welsh should be examined by a psychiatrist. Welsh was never charged in the incident; one former Spokane detective claimed that the story had been "handled in a hush-hush manner". This incident did not become public until October 2002, when the Spokesman-Review in Spokane published the story.

On August 21, 1991, John Paul II accepted Welsh's resignation as bishop of Spokane. His resignation came after a recent arrest in Spokane for driving under the influence of alcohol.

=== Auxiliary bishop of Saint Paul and Minneapolis ===
On November 5, 1991, John Paul II appointed Welsh as an auxiliary bishop of Saint Paul and Minneapolis and titular bishop of Aulon. Lawrence Welsh died on January 13, 1999, at age 63 in Helena, Montana.

== Sources ==
Catholic Church titles
Preceded by Bernard Joseph Topel	Bishop of Spokane; 1978–1990	Succeeded by William S. Skylstad
