= Alexander Joseph Brunett =

Catholic archbishop (1934–2020)

His Excellency, The Most Reverend Alexander Joseph Brunett
- Archbishop Emeritus of Seattle
- Archdiocese: Seattle
- Appointed: October 29, 1997
- Installed: December 18, 1997
- Term ended: September 16, 2010
- Predecessor: Thomas Joseph Murphy
- Successor: J. Peter Sartain
- Previous posts: Bishop of Helena (1994–1997); Apostolic Administrator, Diocese of Oakland (2012–2013)

Orders
- Ordination: July 13, 1958 by Luigi Traglia
- Consecration: July 6, 1994 by William Levada, Elden Francis Curtiss, and Adam Maida

Personal details
- Born: January 17, 1934 Detroit, Michigan, U.S.
- Died: January 31, 2020 (aged 86) Seattle, Washington, U.S.
- Education: Sacred Heart Major Seminary; Pontifical Gregorian University; University of Detroit; Marquette University; Tantur Ecumenical Institute for Theological Studies; Catholic Institute; Goethe Institute
- Motto: Signum fidei panis vitæ (Sign of faith, bread of life)

Styles of Alexander Joseph Brunett
- Reference style: His Excellency; The Most Reverend
- Spoken style: Your Excellency
- Religious style: Archbishop

Ordination history of Alexander Joseph Brunett
History
Episcopal consecration
- Consecrated by: William Levada
- Date: July 6, 1994
Episcopal succession
Bishops consecrated by Alexander Joseph Brunett as principal consecrator
- George Leo Thomas: January 28, 2000
- Eusebio L. Elizondo Almaguer: June 6, 2005
- Joseph J. Tyson: June 6, 2005

Alexander Joseph Brunett (January 17, 1934 – January 31, 2020) was an American prelate of the Roman Catholic Church who served as archbishop of the Archdiocese of Seattle in Washington State from 1997 until his retirement in 2010. Brunett previously served as bishop of the Diocese of Helena in Montana from 1994 to 1997 and after his retirement he served as apostolic administrator of the Diocese of Oakland in California from 2012 to 2013.

Born and raised in Detroit, Michigan, Brunett was ordained to the priesthood in Rome in 1958. From 1959 to 1994 he held several church positions in the Detroit area. In April 1994 he was appointed bishop of Helena by Pope John Paul II and was consecrated bishop later that year. He was appointed archbishop of Seattle in October 1997, and held that office until he reached his mandatory retirement age in 2010. In 2012, Brunett was appointed as apostolic administrator of the Diocese of Oakland and held that position until a permanent bishop was installed in 2013.

== Biography ==
=== Early life ===
The second of ten surviving children, Alexander Joseph Brunett was born in Detroit on January 17, 1934, to Raymond Henry and Cecilia Una Mary (née Gill) Brunett. His father was the first master plumber in the state of Michigan and completed his sixth grade education at St. Charles Grade School in Detroit. His mother was born in Detroit also, but her parents were born in Ireland. His uncle Alexander was also a priest. Although four of his sisters entered the Dominican Order, three of them later left the order to pursue other careers.

As a child, Brunett sold copies of The Detroit Times. Entering Sacred Heart Major Seminary in 1946, he obtained a Bachelor of Arts degree and was valedictorian of his class. He was sent by Cardinal Edward Mooney in 1955 to study at the Pontifical Gregorian University in Rome, where he earned a Licentiate of Sacred Theology and a Bachelor of Sacred Theology degree.

=== Priesthood ===
Brunett was ordained to the priesthood at the Basilica of Santi Bonifacio ed Alessio in Rome for the Archdiocese of Detroit by Archbishop Luigi Traglia on July 13, 1958. While in Rome, he was among those selected as an honor guard for the body of Pope Pius XII after his death later that same year.

Upon his return to Michigan, the archdiocese assigned Brunett as an associate pastor at St. Rose of Lima Parish in Detroit (1959–1961) and then at St. Alphonsus Parish in Dearborn, Michigan (1961–1962). Brunett, while serving at St. Rose, was instructed by Archbishop John Dearden to enroll at the University of Detroit; he later received a Master of Education degree with a thesis on his experience at St. Rose entitled, "A Catholic School in a Changing Neighborhood".

From 1962 to 1964, Brunett served as a chaplain at the University of Michigan in Ann Arbor. He also became a chaplain at Eastern Michigan University in Ypsilanti, Michigan in 1968. Brunett earned a doctorate in theology from Marquette University in Milwaukee, Wisconsin. He did further post-graduate studies at the Tantur Ecumenical Institute for Theological Studies in Jerusalem, the Catholic Institute in Paris, France and the Goethe Institute in Munich, West Germany.

In 1969, Brunett started teaching sacramental theology and served as dean of St. John Provincial Seminary in Plymouth, Michigan. In 1973, he was named both director of the Division of Ecumenical and Interreligious Affairs for the archdiocese and pastor of St. Aidan Parish in Livonia, Michigan. During this time, he served as president of the National Association of Diocesan Ecumenical Officers (1974–1981) as well. Brunett co-founded and served as president of the Ecumenical Institute for Jewish-Christian Studies.

Brunett was also honored by the American Jewish Committee and received the Leo Franklin Award in Human Relations from the Temple Beth El in Detroit in 1989 in "recognition of his efforts to combat anti-Semitism and to create a climate of mutual respect in Catholic-Jewish relations." The Vatican raised Brunett to the rank of Monsignor in 1990, and the archdiocese named him as pastor of the National Shrine of the Little Flower in Royal Oak, Michigan, in 1991.

=== Bishop of Helena ===
On April 19, 1994, Brunett was appointed the eighth bishop of Helene by John Paul II. He received his episcopal consecration on July 6, 1993 from Archbishop William Levada, with Archbishops Elden Curtiss and Adam Maida serving as co-consecrators, in the Cathedral of Saint Helena in Helena, Montana.

Shortly after his arrival in Helena, Brunett began a series of tours of the diocese, attending welcoming ceremonies and visiting parishes. He regularly visited local Indian reservations, and was initiated into the Blackfeet Nation, receiving the name, "Holy Eagle Feather". He was elected chair of the United States Conference of Catholic Bishops' Committee on Ecumenical and Interreligious Affairs in 1996.

=== Archbishop of Seattle ===
Brunett was named the fourth archbishop of Seattle on October 28, 1997. Succeeding the late Thomas Murphy, he was installed on December 18, 1997. He received the pallium, a vestment worn by metropolitan bishops, from John Paul II on June 29, 1998.

Brunett was one of the Catholic delegates to the 1998 Lambeth Conference, a conference of Anglican bishops held every ten years in Canterbury, England. He was named a co-chair of the Anglican-Roman Catholic International Commission in 1999. His ecumenical activity allowed him to meet religious leaders such as Archbishop George Carey of Canterbury, Ecumenical Patriarch Bartholomew of Constantinople, and Archbishop Desmond Tutu. In 2006, in recognition of his work in ecumenical and interfaith dialogue, Brunett received an honorary doctorate from Gonzaga University in Spokane, Washington

During the Catholic sexual abuse scandals in the United States, the Archdiocese of Seattle paid $31 million for settlements, counseling, and attorney fees for about 250 sex abuse victims between 1987 and 2007, but it did not file for bankruptcy. In regards to these cases, Brunett said, "It is certainly a terrible thing. It is an embarrassing thing for me personally."

Despite Great Recession of 2007 to 2008, annual contributions from Catholics in Western Washington doubled during Brunett's tenure as archbishop. They funded the construction of St. Elizabeth Ann Seton Catholic High School, which opened in 2009 in Vancouver, Washington, and Pope John Paul II High School, which opened in 2010 in Lacey, Washington. Brunett also helped launch the Fulcrum Foundation, which provides scholarships to poor families to send their children to Catholic schools. He also oversaw the $7 million purchase, renovation and expansion of the Palisades Retreat Center in Federal Way, Washington.

=== Retirement and legacy ===
Upon reaching the mandatory retirement age of 75 on January 17, 2009, Brunett submitted his letter of resignation to Pope Benedict XVI, with a request to continue in office. His resignation was accepted by Benedict XVI on September 16, 2010. He was succeeded as archbishop of Seattle by Bishop James Sartain.

Within the United States Conference of Catholic Bishops, Burnett sat on the Subcommittee on Native American Catholics and the Board of Bishops for the Pontifical North American College. He was also a board member for St. Patrick Seminary, Mundelein Seminary, and Catholic Near East Welfare Association. Burnett was a lifelong fan of the Detroit Lions professional football team.

=== Apostolic administrator ===
On September 21, 2012, the Vatican named Brunett the apostolic administrator of the Diocese of Oakland following Bishop Salvatore J. Cordileone's departure to become Archbishop of San Francisco. He served as interim ordinary for the diocese until the installation of Michael C. Barber on May 25, 2013.

=== Stroke ===
On September 12, 2013, Brunett suffered a major stroke, which put him in intensive care in the hospital. After recovering from the stroke, Brunett remained actively involved in the archdiocese attending major archdiocesan events until he suffered a fall on April 26, 2019.

Alexander Brunett died in Seattle on January 31, 2020, at age 86.

== See also ==
- Catholic Church hierarchy
- Catholic Church in the United States
- Historical list of the Catholic bishops of the United States
- List of Catholic bishops of the United States
- Lists of patriarchs, archbishops, and bishops
