= Carroll College =

Catholic college in Helena, Montana, US

Coordinates: 46.600867°N 112.039153°W

- Former name: Mount St. Charles College (1909–1932)
- Motto: Non Scholae Sed Vitae
- Motto in English: Not For School, But For Life
- Type: Private college
- Established: 1909; 117 years ago
- Religious affiliation: Catholic Church
- Academic affiliations: Space-grant
- Endowment: $78 million (2025)
- President: Jennifer Glowienka and Austin Vetter (interim co-presidents)
- Students: 1,103 (fall 2023)
- Undergraduates: 1,062 (fall 2023)
- Postgraduates: 41 (fall 2023)
- Location: Helena, Montana, US
- Campus: Rural
- Colors: Purple & Gold
- Nickname: Fighting Saints
- Sporting affiliations: NAIA – Frontier
- Mascots: Halo, St. Bernard
- Website: carroll.edu

Carroll College is a private Catholic college in Helena, Montana, United States. The college has 21 buildings on a 63-acre campus, has over 35 academic majors, participates in 15 NAIA athletic sports, and is home to All Saints Chapel. The college motto, in Latin, is Non scholae, sed vitae. The college translates this into English as "Not for school, but for life." Carroll's colors are purple and gold and the school's athletics teams are known as the Fighting Saints.

== History ==
In 1883, the first bishop of Helena, John Baptist Brondel, proposed a Catholic college in Montana to help produce future priests for the soon-to-be diocese of Helena. He died before his plans could be realized. Pope Pius X selected John Patrick Carroll, a young priest from Dubuque, Iowa, as Brondel's successor.

Bishop John Patrick Carroll, second Bishop of the Diocese of Helena, was able to carve out the funding needed to launch the college while at the same time raising money to construct the Cathedral of St. Helena. In 1909, William Howard Taft, 27th President of the United States, helped lay the cornerstone of St. Charles Hall at the college.

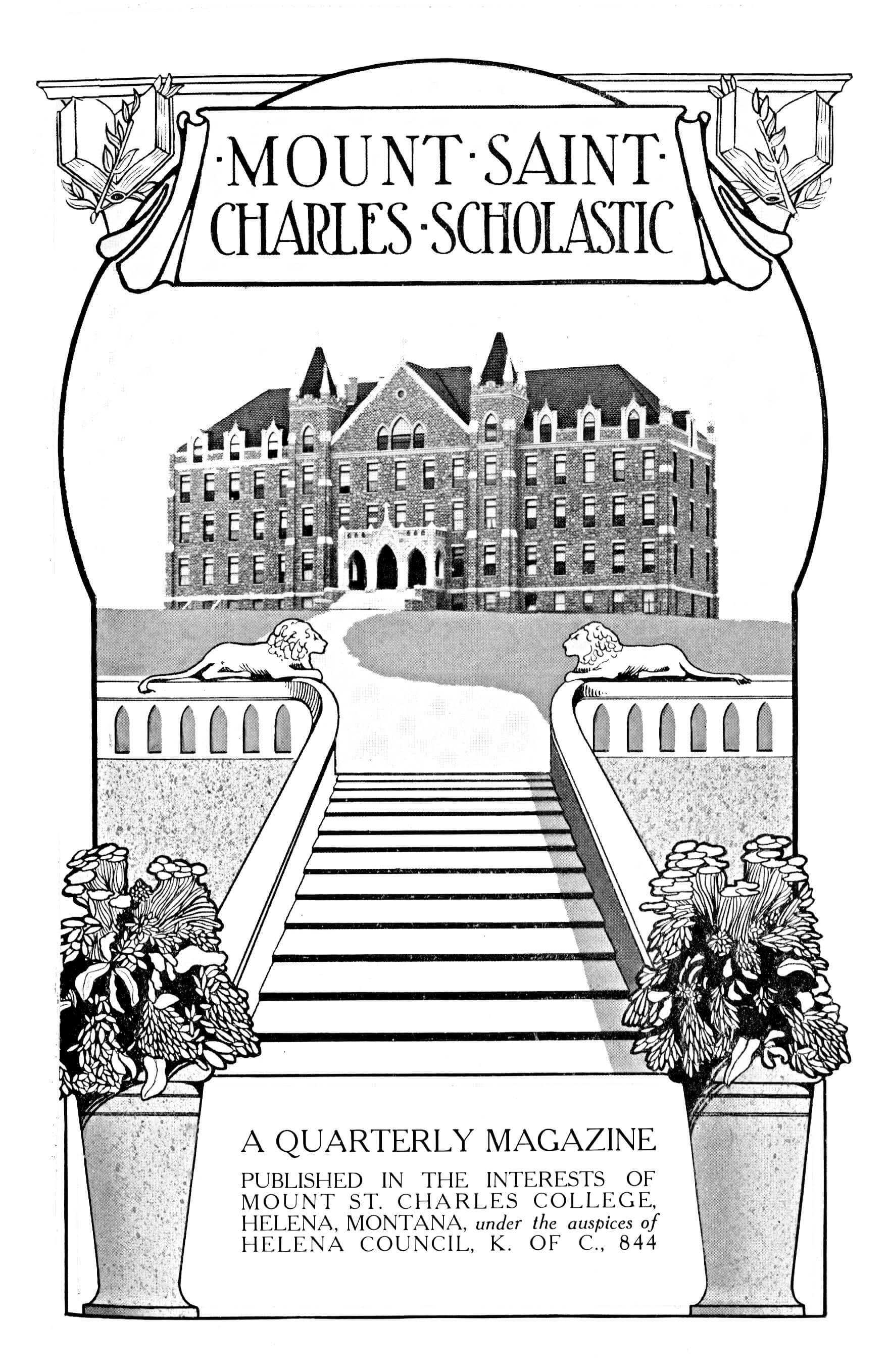
Vol. I, No. 1 (1912) of the Mount Saint Charles Scholastic quarterly shows St. Charles Hall.

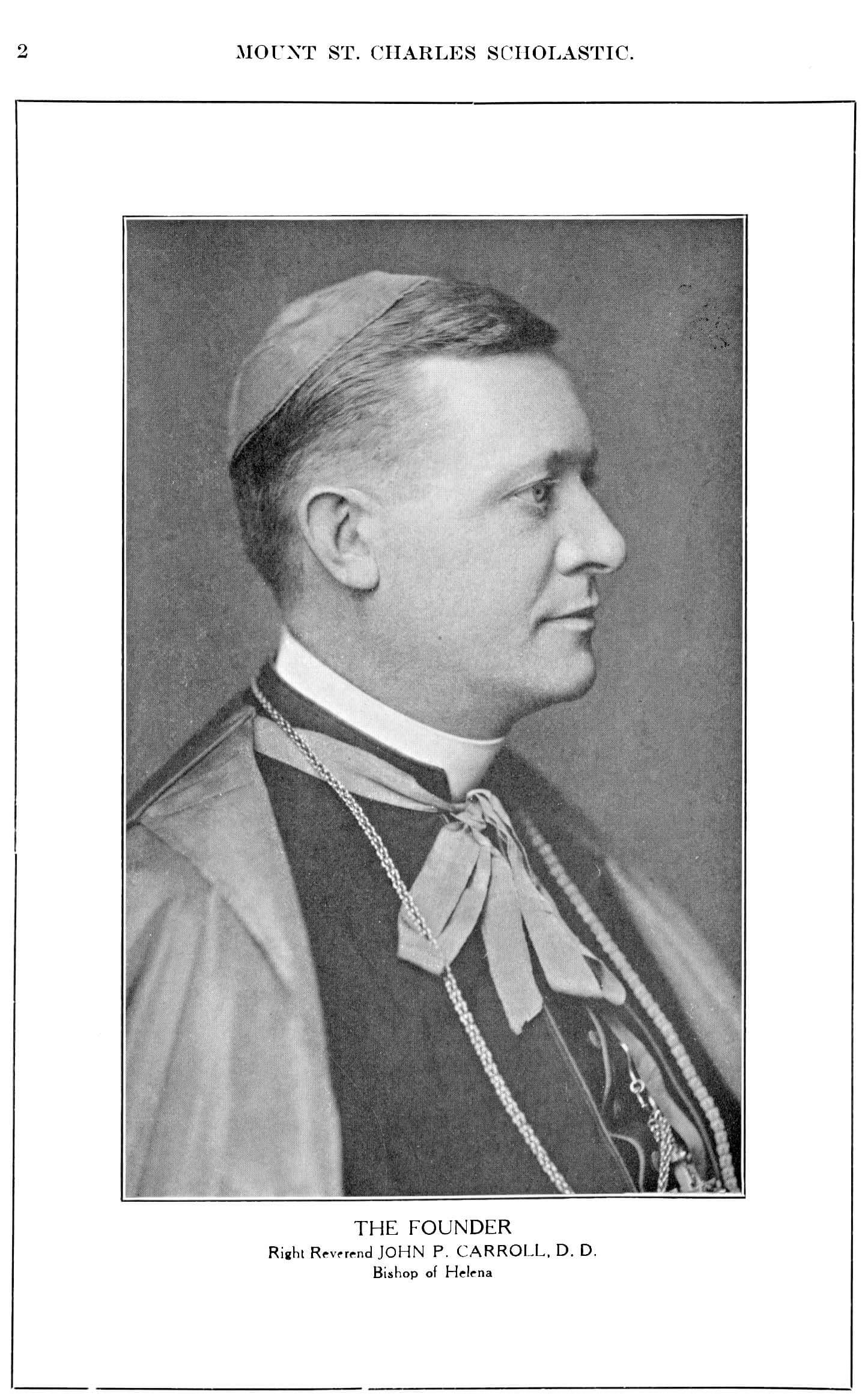
The inaugural issue of the Mount Saint Charles Scholastic quarterly includes a portrait of founder John P. Carroll.

The college was founded on September 27, 1909, by John Patrick Carroll, second Bishop of the Diocese of Helena, Montana. It was originally called "Mount St. Charles College" to honor St. Charles Borromeo. The intent was for it to be an all-men's liberal arts college, with an emphasis on preparing men for careers in the priesthood, law, medicine, teaching, and engineering. In his speech after the laying the cornerstone of St. Charles Hall, President William Howard Taft said, "The college you are building here will be a blessing to Helena and to the whole state of Montana. The only trouble is we have not institutions enough of this kind in the United States."

In September 1910, Mount Saint Charles College opened its doors for classes. The first college student graduated in 1916. In 1932, the school's name was changed to "Carroll College" in honor of its founder.

During the 1935 Helena earthquake, Carroll College suffered only minor damage, while many other buildings and schools in the city were greatly affected. Property damage was estimated at half a million dollars. The top of the gable wall on the southern portion of St. Charles Hall was damaged and many of the structure's large stones had fallen off. The college decided to replace the roof with a slightly shorter and flatter roof.

The fallen stones were repurposed and used to build an observatory on campus. Carroll College's Neuman Observatory, named after former chemistry professor Edward Neuman, is the oldest astronomical observatory in the state of Montana.

During World War II, Carroll College was one of 131 colleges and universities nationally that took part in the V-12 Navy College Training Program; it offered students a path to a Navy commission. After the war, the college began a period of expansion that included enrolling many military veterans under the GI Bill. It later admitted the first female students, and was transformed by changes resulting from the Second Vatican Council.

The 1989 Helena train wreck caused significant damage to Carroll, notably to Guadalupe Hall, the women's dormitory at the time.

On August 1, 2024, Carroll College announced that John Cech, who had served as president of Carroll College since 2018, would retire effective June 30, 2025. On May 1, 2025, Carroll College announced that William Rudd had been appointed to serve as the 19th president of Carroll College effective July 1, 2025. On June 25, 2025, Carroll College announced that Rudd would be unable to assume the role of president due to his need to "focus on personal matters" and that Jennifer Glowienka, Senior Vice President for Academic Affairs, and Austin Vetter, Bishop of the Diocese of Helena, would jointly assume the role as interim co-presidents for the 2025-26 academic year.

== Student life ==
Carroll College has a female-to-male student ratio of nearly 3:2 (60%/40%). Montana residents comprise just under half of the total student body (Montana/Out-of-State: 45%/55%). Of students reporting a religious preference, 44% are Catholic. From an admissions standpoint, US News & World Report indicates Carroll as being "more selective" with an average incoming GPA of 3.46, an ACT of 25, an average SAT (before March 1, 2016) of 1645, and an average SAT (after March 1, 2016) of 1145. Tuition and fees for the 2023 academic year are $37,828. Out-of-state tuition is the same as the original tuition. Total estimated attendance (with room and board) is approximately $40,220.

Carroll has over 35 active student clubs or student groups that host nearly 350 events annually. Groups include CAMP, or Carroll Adventuring and Mountaineers Program, Carroll Crazies, Up 'Til Dawn, Saints' Swing Dance Society, Engineers Without Borders, Carroll Student Activities (CSA), and Carroll Outreach Team.

CAMP offers mountain biking, kayaking, trail running, hiking, backpacking, cross country skiing, downhill skiing, and more. CAMP provides trips for students to explore the outdoors during academic breaks, such as a spring break to Moab, Utah. The Carroll College newspaper, The Prospector, is student-run and student-written.

== Academics ==
Carroll College offers numerous academic majors in the major liberal arts and life sciences, as well as engineering, education, computer science, nursing, physics, ROTC, and theology. The school offers as well as several medical pre-professional programs including pre-seminary, pre-med, pre-dental, pre-pharmacy and pre-veterinary. The school is known for a higher than average rate of acceptance of its students into medical school. The national average medical school acceptance rate is approximately 44%. Carroll College students have an 85% average acceptance into med school and dental school. Unique to the college is a Human-Animal Bond Program, now anthrozoology. It offered the first such undergraduate degree in the US.

The college was ranked by US News & World Report as the #1 Regional College in the West in the 2021 edition of America's Best Colleges. Carroll College held this ranking for 10 consecutive years.

== Campus ==
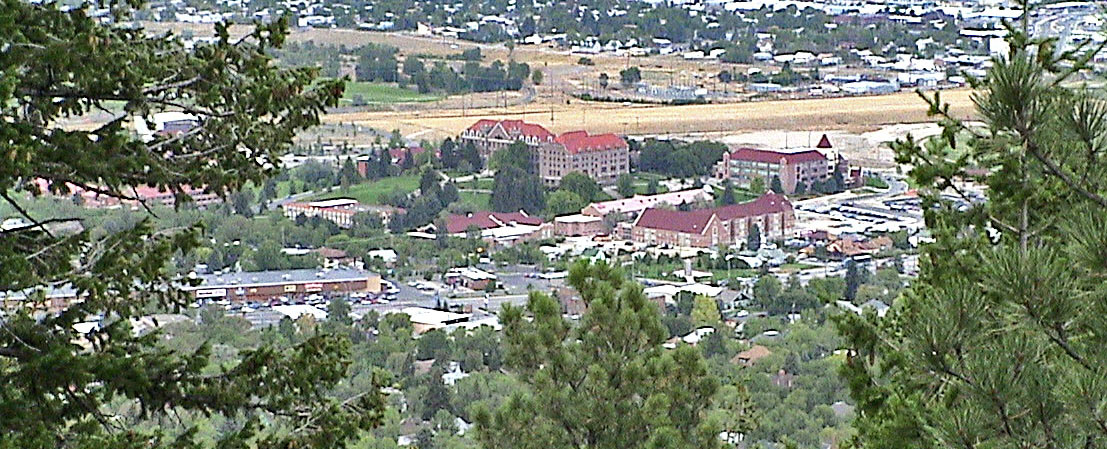
Southern portion of the Carroll College campus, as seen from atop Mount Helena

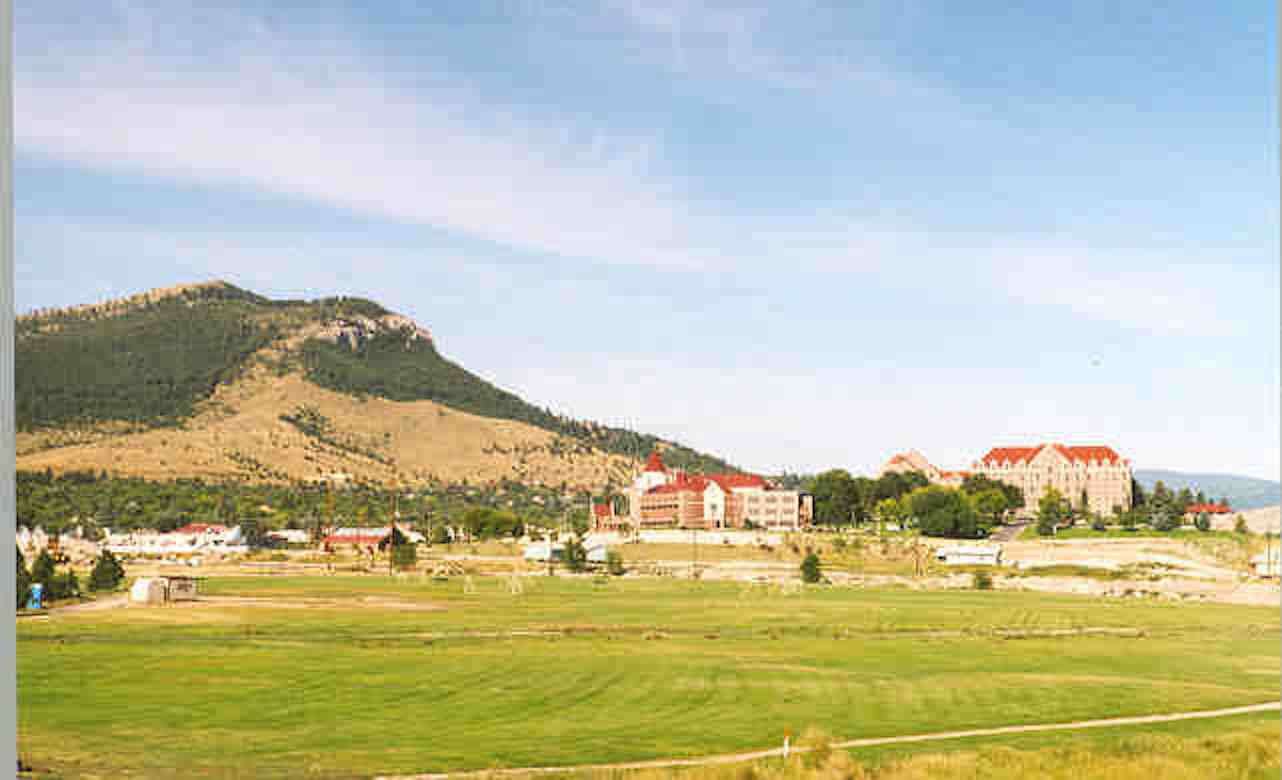
The Carroll College campus (right), viewed from the northeast, with Mount Helena in the left background

Carroll College has four residence halls on campus. These are Trinity Hall, Borromeo Hall, Guadalupe Hall, and St. Charles Hall. Additionally, Carroll has on-campus apartments open to third-year students and above. Carroll has community advisors on every floor of every residence hall. Among their duties are creating events for members of his or her floor.

The football stadium is known as Nelson Stadium. In 2017, the Hunthausen Activity Center (HAC) will house student recreation and fitness. The Student Center is informally known as "The Cube," derived from "Carroll Campus Center," or C-cubed.

Simperman Hall houses classrooms, science labs, and offices for professors. Wiegand Amphitheater, located in Simperman Hall, seats approximately 140 students, and student groups sometimes show movies for the student body. Built in 1979, the Corette Library houses classrooms, computer labs, study rooms, conference rooms, and a small auditorium. It is open to the general public for use. St. Charles has classrooms, professors' offices, a small chapel, and the president's office and staff. In addition, the Artaza center—the center for global education—is located in St. Charles. On the fourth floor of St. Charles is the bouldering wall, open to students to climb.

Old North, the north wing of St. Charles, was a gymnasium for Mount St. Charles College. Old North was deconstructed and rebuilt as All Saints Chapel, finished in 2017. St. Albert's Hall holds the alumni and development office. The Civil Engineering building has a fully equipped lab, and the engineering department hosts occasional barbecues.

== Athletics ==
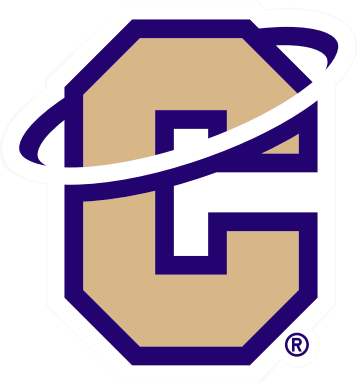
Carroll athletics logo

The Carroll athletic teams are called the Fighting Saints. The college is a member of the National Association of Intercollegiate Athletics (NAIA), primarily competing in the Frontier Conference since the 1935–36 academic year.

Carroll competes in 15 intercollegiate varsity sports: Men's sports include basketball, cross country, football, golf, soccer and track & field (indoor and outdoor); while women's sports include basketball, cross country, soccer, softball, track & field (indoor and outdoor) and volleyball.

=== Facilities ===
Nelson Stadium is home to the football and soccer teams; the PE Center hosts basketball and volleyball games along with several other community events; the Green Meadow Country Club is home to the golf teams; Helena's Centennial Park hosts the softball team's home games; and the track & field teams host events at Helena's Vigilante Stadium.

== Notable alumni ==
- Casey FitzSimmons, National Football League (NFL) tight end, Detroit Lions (2003–2009)
- Jeffrey M. Fleming, Coadjutor bishop of the Diocese of Great Falls-Billings
- John Gagliardi, college football head coach
- Sinan Güler, Turkish professional basketball player
- Norman "Jeff" Holter, biophysicist
- Raymond Hunthausen, Archbishop of Seattle (1975–1991)
- Father Stuart Long, boxer-turned-Catholic priest; inspiration for the 2022 film Father Stu
- Joseph Monaghan, congressman from Montana (1933–1937)
- Luke Muszkiewicz, state legislator
- Jerry O'Connell, congressman from Montana (1937–39)
- Bobby Petrino, head football coach at Missouri State
- Paul Petrino, head football coach at the University of Idaho
- Marc Racicot, Governor of Montana (1993–2001)
- Jovan Šljivančanin, Serbian professional basketball player
- George Thomas, Bishop of Helena (2004–2018), Archbishop of Las Vegas (2018–present)
- Bernard Topel, Bishop of Spokane (1955–1978)
- Tarah Wheeler, Cybersecurity Executive and Author of Women in Tech
