= John Patrick Carroll =

American prelate

His Excellency, The Right Reverend John Patrick Carroll
- Bishop of Helena
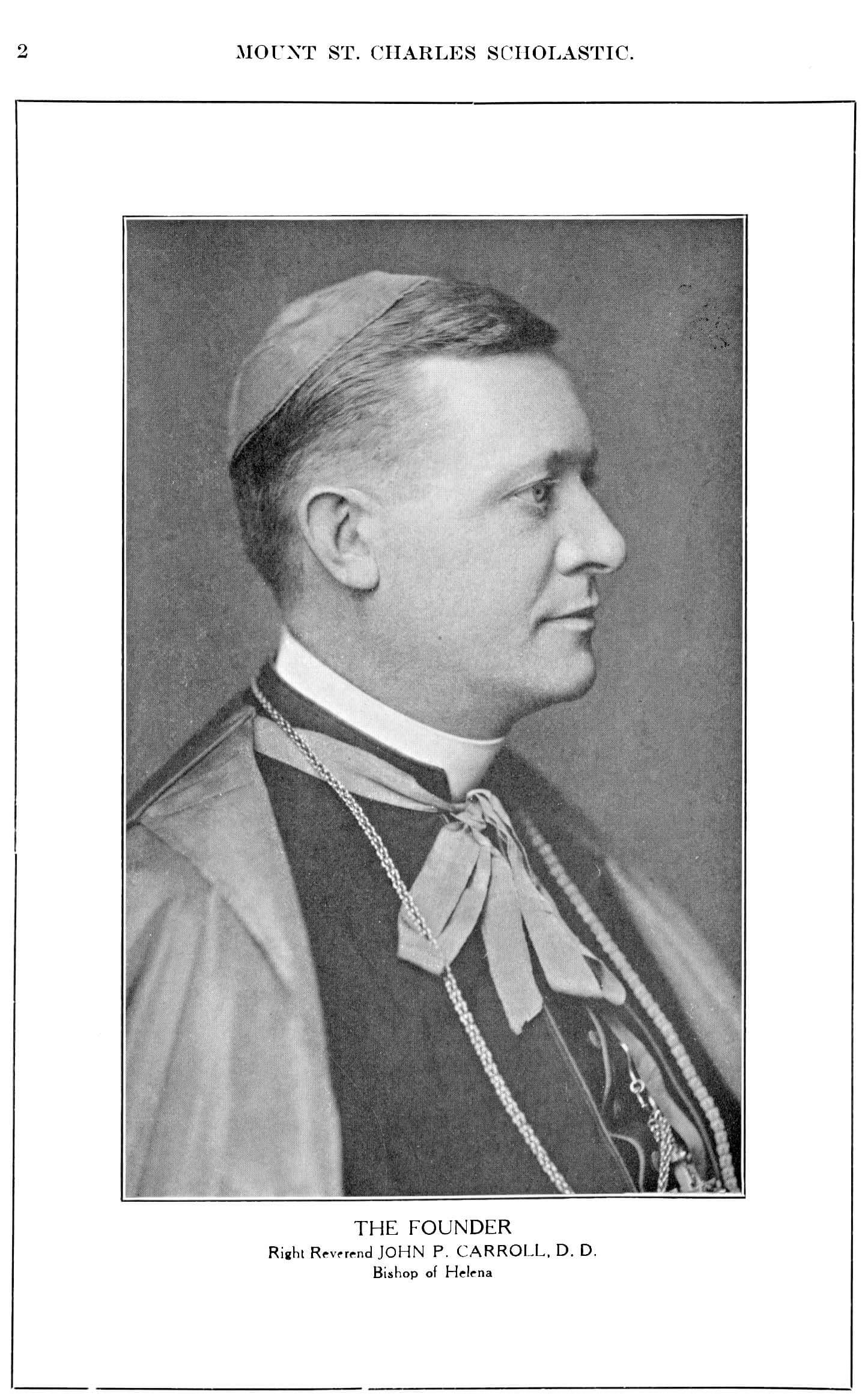
- Bishop Carroll in the Mount Saint Charles Scholastic quarterly (1912)
- Church: Catholic Church
- Diocese: Diocese of Helena
- Appointed: September 12, 1904
- Term ended: November 4, 1925 (his death)
- Predecessor: Jean-Baptiste Brondel
- Successor: George Joseph Finnigan

Orders
- Ordination: July 7, 1889 by Édouard-Charles Fabre
- Consecration: December 21, 1904 by John Joseph Keane

Personal details
- Born: February 22, 1864 Dubuque, Iowa, U.S.
- Died: November 4, 1925 (aged 61) Fribourg, Switzerland
- Education: St. Joseph's College
- Motto: In sanctitate et iustitia (In holiness and justice)

John Patrick Carroll (February 22, 1864 – November 4, 1925) was an American prelate of the Catholic Church. He served as bishop of the Diocese of Helena in Montana from 1904 until his death in 1925.

== Biography ==
=== Early life ===
Carroll was born on February 22, 1864, in Dubuque, Iowa, to Martin and Catherine (née O'Farrell) Carroll, both Irish natives. He received his early education at the parochial school of St. Raphael's Cathedral in Dubuque. Carroll then entered St. Joseph's College in Dubuque at age 13, graduating in 1883. He studied for the priesthood at the Grand Seminary of Montreal in Montreal, Quebec, where he earned his Doctor of Divinity degree.

=== Priesthood ===
While in Montreal, Carroll was ordained a priest for the Archdiocese of Dubuque on July 7, 1889, by Archbishop Édouard-Charles Fabre. Upon his return to Dubuque, he performed his first mass at St. Raphael's Cathedral on July 11, 1889. He was appointed to the faculty of his alma mater, St. Joseph's College, assuming the role of professor of philosophy on September 12, 1889. On September 12, 1894, Carroll was promoted to president of St. Joseph's, a position he held for the next decade.

=== Bishop of Helena ===
On September 12, 1904, Carroll was appointed the second bishop of Helena by Pope Pius X. He received his episcopal consecration on December 21, 1904, from Archbishop John Keane, with Bishops Richard Scannell and Charles O'Reilly serving as co-consecrators, at St. Raphael's Cathedral. He was installed on January 31, 1905.

In 1904, the Diocese of Helena contained 53 priests, 65 churches, and nine parochial schools to serve 50,000 Catholics. By the time of Carroll's death 21 years later, there were 104 priests, 101 churches, 24 parochial schools, and a Catholic population of 64,000. During his tenure, he laid the cornerstone for the new Cathedral of Saint Helena in Helena, Montana in 1908 and established Mount St. Charles College in Helena in 1909.

Carroll was a vocal opponent of socialism, which he believed made "no allowance for the development of man's talents, intellectual gifts, his spirit of economy or his ability...Should this policy be pursued it would mean the ruin of a nation." He also condemned alcohol as "the most prolific source of poverty and misery" and successfully lobbied the Helena City Council to require bars to close by midnight. The son of Irish immigrants, he supported the Irish Home Rule movement and served as national chaplain of the Ancient Order of Hibernians.

=== Death and legacy ===
While traveling for his ad limina visit to Rome, Carroll died from a cerebral hemorrhage on November 4, 1925, while in Fribourg, Switzerland. His body was shipped back to the United States and buried at Resurrection Cemetery in Helena. Mount St. Charles College was renamed Carroll College in his honor.

Catholic Church titles
Preceded by Jean-Baptiste Brondel	Bishop of Helena; 1904–1925	Succeeded by George Joseph Finnigan
