= Robert C. Morlino =

American prelate (1946–2018)

His Excellency, The Most Reverend Robert Charles Morlino
- Bishop of Madison
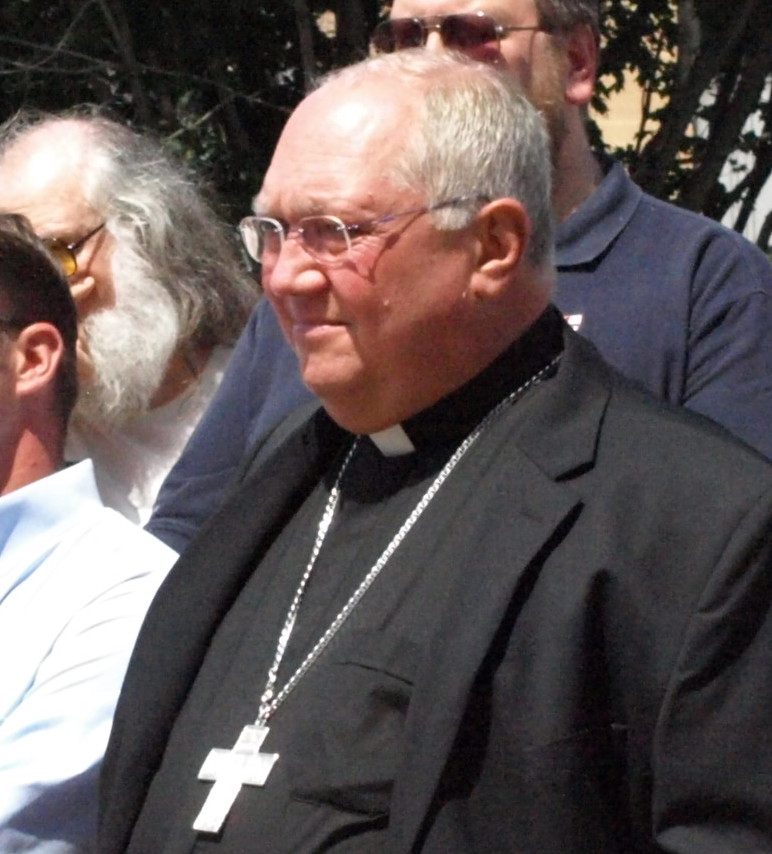
- Morlino in 2010
- Diocese: Diocese of Madison
- Appointed: May 23, 2003
- Installed: August 1, 2003
- Term ended: November 24, 2018
- Predecessor: William Henry Bullock
- Successor: Donald J. Hying
- Previous post: Bishop of Helena (1999 to 2003)

Orders
- Ordination: June 1, 1974 by Lawrence Joseph Shehan
- Consecration: September 21, 1999 by Gabriel Montalvo Higuera, John George Vlazny, and Paul Vincent Donovan

Personal details
- Born: December 31, 1946 Scranton, Pennsylvania, US
- Died: November 24, 2018 (aged 71) St. Mary's Hospital (Madison, Wisconsin), US
- Education: Fordham University; University of Notre Dame; Weston School of Theology
- Motto: Visus non mentietur (The vision shall not disappoint)

Styles of Robert Charles Morlino
- Reference style: His Excellency; The Most Reverend
- Spoken style: Your Excellency
- Religious style: Bishop

Robert Charles Morlino (December 31, 1946 – November 24, 2018) was an American Catholic prelate who served as bishop of Madison in Wisconsin from 2003 until his death. He previously served as bishop of Helena in Montana from 1999 to 2003.

== Early life and education ==
An only child, Robert Morlino was born on December 31, 1946, in Scranton, Pennsylvania, to Charles and Albertina Morlino. He was of part Polish descent. His father died while he was attending Scranton Preparatory School, and he was primarily raised by his mother and grandmother. Deciding to become a priest, Morlino entered the novitiate for the Maryland Province of the Jesuits. He then studied at Fordham University in New York City, obtaining a Bachelor of Arts degree in philosophy in 1969.

Morlino earned a Master of Philosophy degree from the University of Notre Dame in Indiana in 1970, and a Master of Theology degree from the Weston School of Theology at Boston College Massachusetts.

== Ordination and ministry ==
Morlino was ordained to the priesthood by Cardinal Lawrence Joseph Shehan for the Jesuits at the Loyal University Maryland Chapel in Baltimore on June 1, 1974. After his ordination, the Jesuits assigned him to teach at Loyola College. He also had teaching assignments at St. Joseph's University, Boston College, the University of Notre Dame, and St. Mary's College. Morlino also served as an instructor in continuing education for priests, religious, and laity, as well as director of parish renewal programs.

On October 26, 1983, Morlino was incardinated, or transferred, from the Jesuits into the Diocese of Kalamazoo. Morlino there served as episcopal vicar for Spiritual Development, executive assistant and theological consultant to Bishop Alfred Markiewicz, Moderator of the Curia, and promoter of justice in the diocesan tribunal.

In 1990, Morlino earned a Doctor of Moral Theology degree from the Pontifical Gregorian University in Rome. After returning to Michigan, he was appointed as a theology professor at Sacred Heart Major Seminary in Detroit, where he expected to spend his life prior to his promotion to a bishop. He was also named rector of St. Augustine Cathedral in Kalamazoo in 1991.

== Bishop of Helena ==
On July 6, 1999, Morlino was appointed the ninth bishop of Helena by Pope John Paul II. He received his episcopal consecration at the Cathedral of Saint Helena in Helena, Montana, on September 21, 1999 from Archbishop Gabriel Higuera, with Archbishop John Vlazny and Bishop Paul Donovan serving as co-consecrators. Morlino selected as his episcopal motto: Visus Non Mentietur, meaning, "The vision will not disappoint" (Habakkuk 2:3).

== Bishop of Madison ==
Morlino was named the fourth bishop of Madison on May 23, 2003, by John Paul II. He was installed on August 1, 2003.

Morlino supported the application of Summorum Pontificum, the apostolic letter issued by Pope Benedict XVI in 2007 on the Tridentine Mass in his diocese, celebrating the mass in several parishes. Morlino ordered all the parishes to relocate the tabernacles in their sanctuaries to central places of prominence. Morlino encouraged parishioners to receive the eucharist on the tongue while kneeling, and he encouraged pastors to enlist only male altar servers. One of his main objectives was to increase vocations to the priesthood in his diocese. He helped raise $44 million for the endowment fund "Priests for Our Future". The number of seminarians studying for the priesthood grew from six to 30 during his episcopate, one of the largest increases in the United States. Catholics in his diocese had divided opinions of his actions.

A fire severely damaged St. Raphael's Cathedral in Madison in 2005. In 2007, Morlino announced that the diocese would rebuild the cathedral on its previous site, reusing the steeple and other items from the old building.Morlino served as chair of the Bishops' Committee on the Diaconate and Ad Hoc Committee on Health Care Issues and the Church, both units of the United States Conference of Catholic Bishops.

In 2009, Morlino announced that the Catholic Multicultural Center – a building that fed, educated and supported many on Madison's south side – would close as part of widespread diocesan budget cuts. A handoff to local parish administration and fundraising drive was announced one week later.

== Death ==
Morlino had a cardiac event during medical testing on November 21, 2018. Robert Morlino died in Madison on November 24, 2018, at age 71.

== Views ==
Morlino was widely perceived as a conservative bishop.

=== Abortion ===
Morlino believed that canon law should be interpreted as requiring priests to deny the eucharist to politicians who supported abortion rights for women and euthanasia. During the 2008 US presidential election, Morlino criticized House Speaker Nancy Pelosi and Senator Joe Biden for their remarks regarding abortion on the television program Meet the Press. He said that "because they claim to be Catholic," Pelosi and Biden were "violating the separation of church and state" and "stepping on the pope's turf and mine."

=== LGBTQ issues ===
In 2004, Morlino publicly criticized what he termed as Madison's apparent lack of a moral compass. He said that the city existed below a religious "moral minimum" and had "virtually no public morality." He specifically cited the popularity of the city's StageQ community theater company, a gay and lesbian theater troupe, as evidence of this view.

In 2017, Morlino arranged for his vicar general to send a memo to all the diocesan priests about LGBTQ Catholics. It stated that priests may deny Catholic funeral masses to individuals who had entered into same-sex civil unions or marriages "to avoid public scandal of the faithful." The memo advised clergy to consider whether the deceased or the living partner was a "promoter of the 'gay' lifestyle." To minimize scandal, the deceased's partner should have no public role in any funeral rite or service. Outraged by this memo, thousands of people signed a petition to the Vatican seeking Morlino's removal as bishop.

In 2018 Morlino wrote an open letter regarding the sexual abuse scandal in the Catholic Church. He condemned the abuse of minors and described a "homosexual subculture" that allegedly facilitated homosexual sexual activities between priests and other adults. He criticized the alleged acceptance of behaviors the Catholic Church considered sinful by members of the Church hierarchy, writing, "We must be done with sin. It must be rooted out and again considered unacceptable. Love sinners? Yes. Accept true repentance? Yes. But do not say sin is okay."

Morlino further wrote in 2018,

"There has been a great deal of effort to keep separate acts which fall under the category of now-culturally-acceptable acts of homosexuality from the publically [sic] deplorable acts of pedophilia. That is to say, until recently the problems of the Church have been painted purely as problems of pedophilia — this despite clear evidence to the contrary. It is time to be honest that the problems are both and they are more."

Morlino decried clerical abuse of minors, Cardinal Theodore McCarrick's sexual harassment and abuse of adult seminarians, and an alleged network of sexually active gay priests; interpreters of the letter disagreed on whether he was conflating these three matters. Some interpreted Morlino as linking homosexuality with pedophilia, and countered by citing studies showing a lack of correlation between pedophilia and homosexuality. Conservative Catholics cited studies showing that the vast majority of victims were male and that many were not prepubescent. They therefore said that the problem was more closely linked to homosexuality than pedophilia. Morlino urged victims to report accusations to the police, and called for reparations to the victims as well as prayer and fasting by Catholics to atone for the offenses.

=== Ruth Kolpack ===
In March 2009, Morlino dismissed Ruth Kolpack from her post as a pastoral associate at St. Thomas the Apostle Parish in Beloit, Wisconsin, citing breaches of orthodoxy. In a brief meeting with Kolpack, he asked her to take an oath of loyalty and to denounce her 2003 thesis. This thesis advocated women's ordination in the Catholic Church and inclusive language in the liturgy relating to God. Kolpack agreed to take the oath but refused to denounce her thesis.

=== Rights of workers ===
In 2020, when the Wisconsin Legislature was considering a budget proposal that would curtail the collective bargaining rights of public employees (later enacted), Morlino distanced himself from the positions of other Wisconsin bishops, writing

"The question to which the dilemma boils down is rather simple on its face: is the sacrifice which union members, including school teachers, are called upon to make, proportionate to the relative sacrifice called for from all in difficult economic times? In other words, is the sacrifice fair in the overall context of our present situation?"

Milwaukee Archbishop Jerome Listecki had issued a statement calling for Wisconsin legislators to abide by a "moral obligation" to fully consider the "legitimate rights" of public employees.

Catholic Church titles
Preceded by William Henry Bullock	Bishop of Madison; 2003–2018	Succeeded by Donald J. Hying
Preceded by Alexander Joseph Brunett	Bishop of Helena; 1999–2003	Succeeded by George Leo Thomas
