= Diocese of Helena =

Latin Catholic jurisdiction in the US

Coordinates: 46°35′24″N 112°02′00″W

Diocese of Helena Dioecesis Helenensis
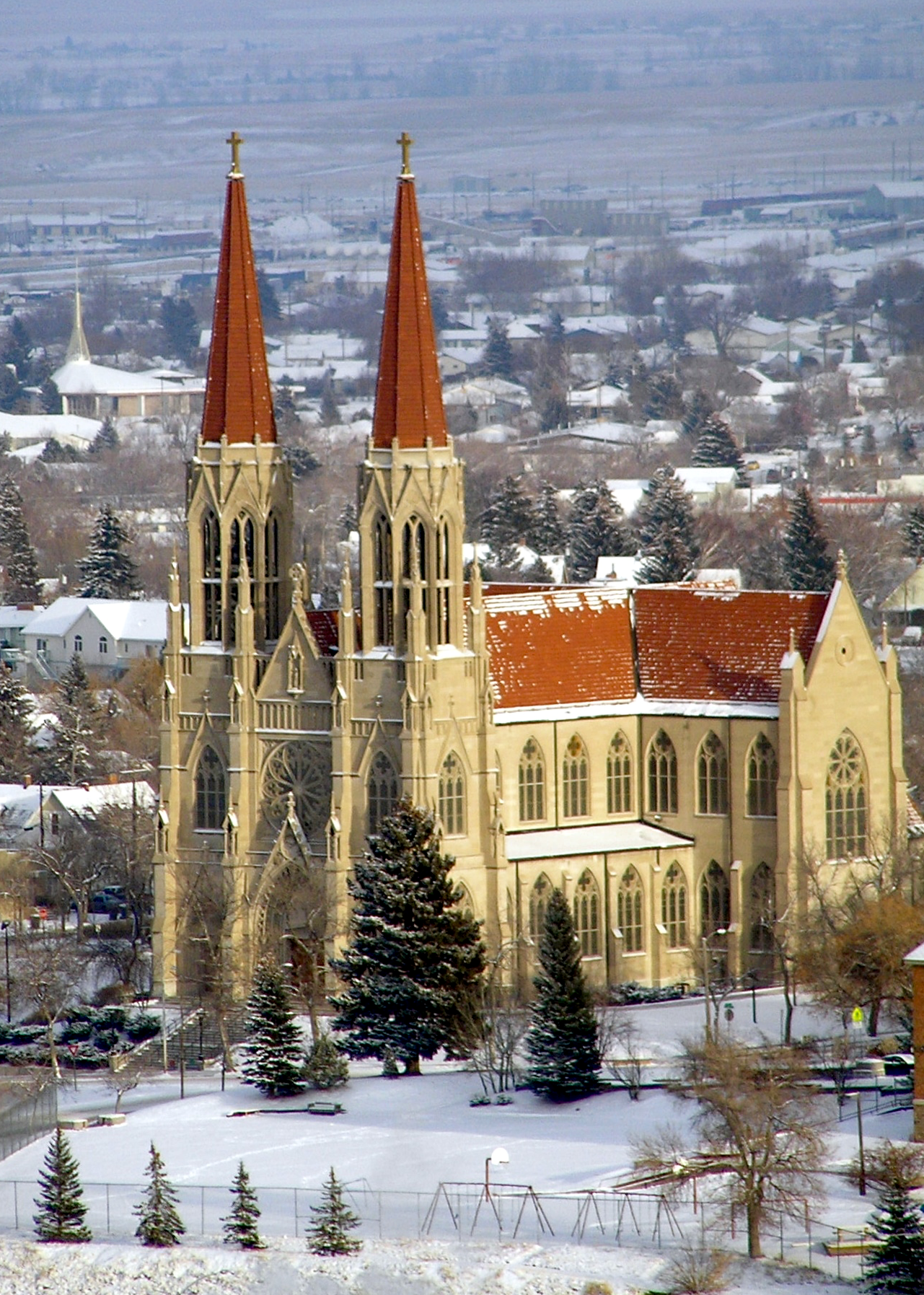
- Cathedral of Saint Helena

- Coat of arms

Location
- Country: United States
- Territory: Lewis and Clark, Teton, Flathead, Lincoln, Missoula, Sanders, Powell, Granite, Ravalli, Deer Lodge, Silver Bow, Jefferson, Broadwater, Gallatin, Madison, Lake, and Beaverhead counties plus parts of Meagher, Musselshell, and Toole counties in Montana
- Ecclesiastical province: Portland

Statistics
- Area: 51,922 sq mi (134,480 km^{2})
- Population: Total; Catholics: (as of 2025); 595,114; 48,291 (7.5%)
- Parishes: 57
- Schools: 9

Information
- Denomination: Catholic
- Sui iuris church: Latin Church
- Rite: Roman Rite
- Established: March 7, 1884
- Cathedral: Cathedral of Saint Helena
- Patron saint: St. Helena

Current leadership
- Pope: Leo XIV
- Bishop: Austin Anthony Vetter
- Metropolitan Archbishop: Alexander K. Sample

Map
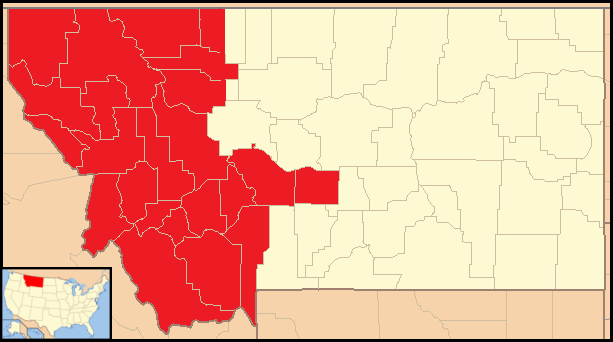

Website
- diocesehelena.org

The Diocese of Helena (Latin: Dioecesis Helenensis) is a diocese of the Catholic Church in western Montana in the United States. Erected in 1884, it is a suffragan diocese of the ecclesiastical province of the Archdiocese of Portland in Oregon. The see church is the Cathedral of Saint Helena in Helena.

== Territory ==
The Diocese of Helena covers 51,922 square miles, encompassing 21 counties and parts of two others. As of 2023, the diocese had 57 parishes and 38 missions divided into six deaneries: Bozeman, Butte, Conrad, Helena, Kalispell, and Missoula.

The diocese in 2023 was served by 61 priests, 34 permanent deacons, seven religious brothers and four nuns.

== History ==
=== 1800 to 1880 ===
The earliest Catholic presence in western Montana was the arrival of Catholic Iroquois/Haudenosaunee fur traders who settled with the Flathead Nation around 1811. The Flathead sent emissaries to St. Louis, Missouri four times in the 1830s to petition the Diocese of St. Louis for their own missionaries.

Finally, in 1840, the diocese sent missionary Pierre-Jean de Smet to Montana. The next year, the priest returned to Montana to found St. Mary's Mission near present-day Missoula. In 1844, DeSmet worked to create St. Ignatius's Mission north of Missoula.

In 1873, Catholic missionaries built the first Catholic chapel in Missoula, then constructed St. Francis Xavier Church there in 1881. In Butte, the first Catholic church, St. Patrick's, also opened in 1881.

=== 1880 to 1900 ===
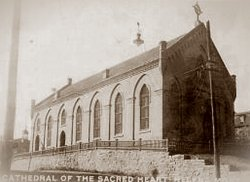
Cathedral of the Sacred Hearts of Jesus and Mary, Helena's first cathedral (pre-1914)

In April 1883, Pope Leo XIII erected the Apostolic Vicariate of Montana, including what is present day Montana. He appointed Bishop Jean-Baptiste Brondel of the Diocese of Vancouver Island as the apostolic vicar. One year later, the same pope created the Diocese of Helena to replace the vicariate, with Brondel as its first bishop.

During his tenure, Brondel traveled throughout the state, establishing several new parishes and building churches. The first Catholic church in Bozeman was the Shèn White Chapel, constructed in 1886.

He also significantly increased the number of priests; by 1903, the number of seminarians in Montana increased from one to thirteen. Brondel took a particular interest in the evangelization of Native Americans, and the United States government often used his popularity among that community to further its aims. In 1889, Montana achieved statehood. St. Matthew's Church, the first Catholic church in Kalispell, was dedicated in 1894.

=== 1900 to 1933 ===
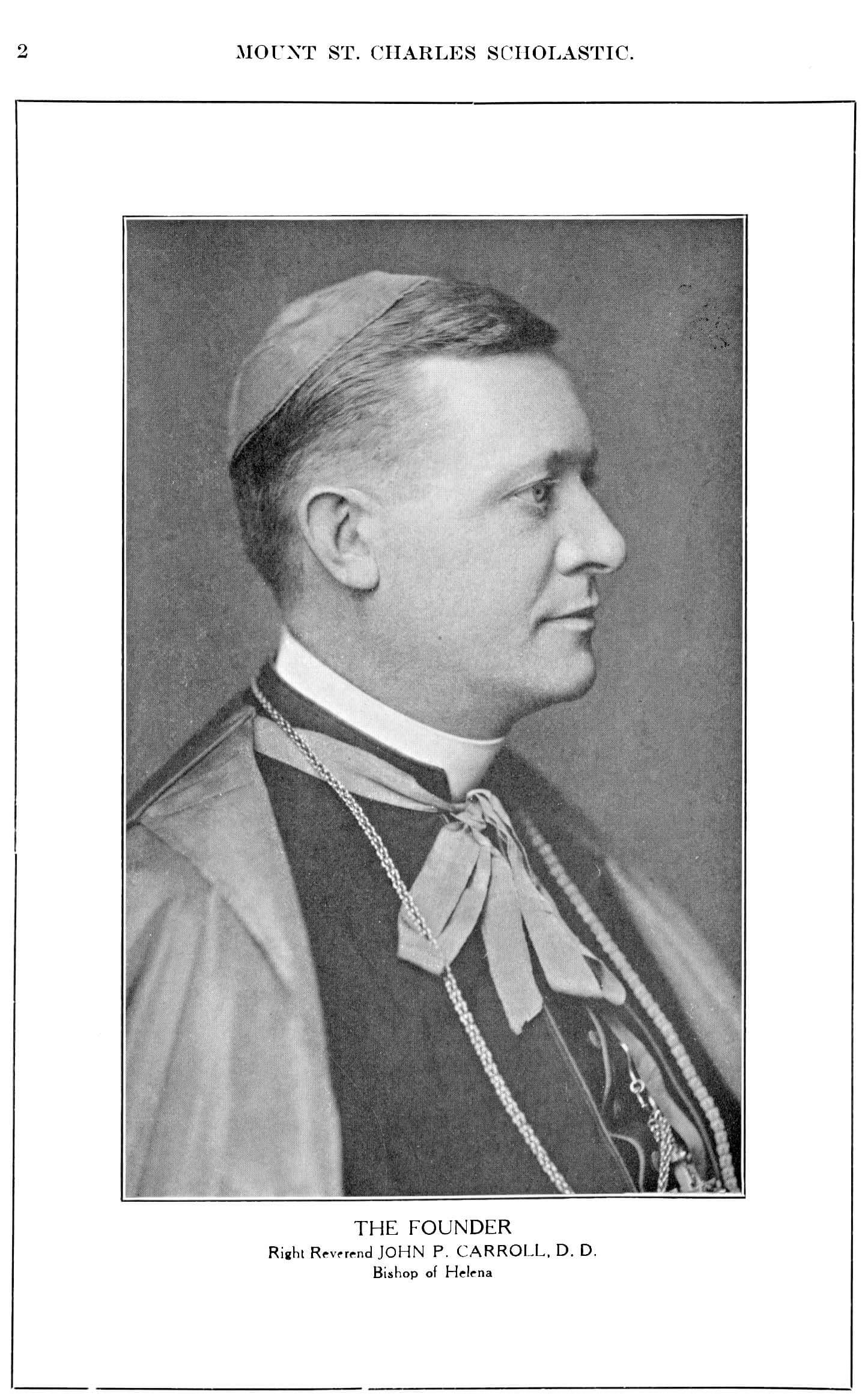
Bishop Carroll (1912)

After Brondel died in 1903, the next bishop of Helena was John Carroll of the Diocese of Dubuque. That same year, the pope erected the Diocese of Great Falls to cover the eastern half of the state. When Carroll became bishop, the diocese had 53 priests, 65 churches, and nine parochial schools to serve 50,000 Catholics. In 1904, Carroll started the construction of the Cathedral of Saint Helena.

Carroll was a vocal opponent of socialism, which he believed made "no allowance for the development of man's talents, intellectual gifts, his spirit of economy or his ability." He also condemned alcohol as "the most prolific source of poverty and misery" and successfully lobbied the Helena City Council to require bars to close by midnight. Carroll died in Europe in 1925.

Pope Pius XI named George Finnigan in 1927 to be the third bishop of Helena. Finnigan had been the provincial for the US Province of the Congregation of Holy Cross.

When Finnigan took office, the diocese had 104 priests, 101 churches, 24 parochial schools, and a Catholic population of 64,000. The Blackfoot Confederacy adopted Finnigan into the tribe in Browning in 1928. The tribal leader, Mountain Chief, gave Finnigan the name "Na-toa-ye-owa-shin" ("Holy Word"). Finnigan raised money to upgrade their churches, schools and infrastructure. The diocese also responded to the Wall Street Crash of 1929 and a severe drought by increasing its care for the poor. Finnigan worked hard to gain accreditation and long-term financial support for Mount St. Charles College. Finnigan died in 1932.

=== 1933 to 1975 ===
In 1933, Pope Pius XI appointed Ralph Hayes from the Diocese of Pittsburgh as the fourth bishop of Helena. After two years in Helena, Hayes was named rector of the Pontifical North American College in Rome. To replace Hayes, Pope Pius XI appointed Monsignor Joseph Gilmore of Helena. During his 26-year-long tenure, Gilmore presided over a period of great growth for the diocese. In addition to the material development, programs were developed to foster vocations, help resettle refugees from World War II, retrain unskilled workers, aid in adoptions, and promote the lay apostolate.

After Gilmore died in 1969, Pope Paul VI named Raymond Hunthausen of Helena as the next bishop of the diocese. Starting in 1976, Hunthausen worked with Call to Action, a progressive Catholic group. Hunthausen was named archbishop of the Archdiocese of Seattle in 1975.

=== 1975 to present ===
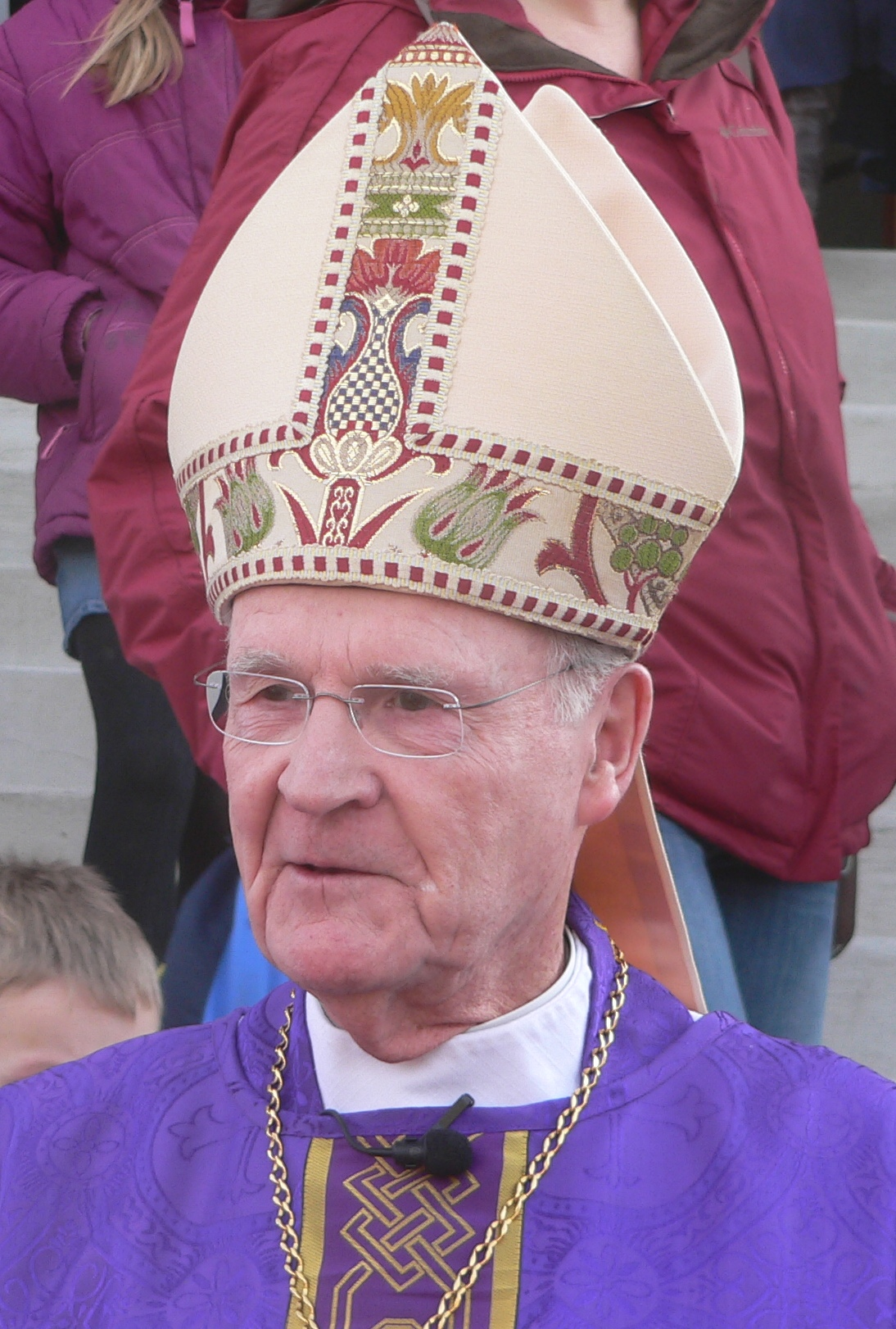
Archbishop Curtiss (2013)

Elden Curtiss of the Diocese of Baker was the next bishop of Helena, taking office in 1976. After 17 years as bishop of Helena, Curtiss became archbishop of the Archdiocese of Omaha in 1993. Pope John Paul II appointed Alexander Brunett of the Archdiocese of Detroit to replace Curtiss. Brunett regularly visited local Indian reservations, and was initiated into the Blackfeet Nation, receiving the name "Holy Eagle Feather". Brunett was made archbishop of Seattle in 1997.

Robert C. Morlino of the Diocese of Kalamazoo succeeded Brunett in 1999. In 2003, Morlino became bishop of the Diocese of Madison. Auxiliary Bishop George Thomas of Seattle replaced Morlino in 2004. In January 2014, the diocese filed for Chapter 11 bankruptcy protection as part of a $15 million settlement intended to go to 362 victims of sex abuse by clergy. In 2018, Pope Francis selected Thomas to serve as bishop of the Diocese of Las Vegas.

The current bishop of Helena, since 2018, is Austin Vetter from the Diocese of Bismarck. The diocese in 2022 sold the former Temple Emanu-El in Helena to the Montana Jewish Project. It is the oldest synagogue in the state.

=== Sexual abuse ===
In 1989, a victim accused Wilson Smart, a diocesan priest, of sexual abuse of children. Smart admitted molesting more than 30 boys from 1957 to 1978. Curtiss discovered that the diocese knew in 1959 about Smart's attraction to boys and did nothing about it. The diocese settled with four of Smart's victims out of court, one for $1.7 million.

== Coat of arms ==
Coat of arms of Diocese of Helena
| Escutcheon Chevronny of eight argent and vert, over all a long cross enfiling in fess an open crown or Symbolism The green and silver chevrons represent the mountains of Montana, alongside the heraldic symbols of St. Helena. |

== Bishops ==
=== Apostolic Vicar of Montana ===
Jean-Baptiste Brondel (1883–1884)
- Augustin Ravoux, S.J. (appointed in 1868), incapacitated, unable to assume office

=== Bishops of Helena ===
1. Jean-Baptiste Brondel (1884–1903)
2. John Patrick Carroll (1904–1925)
3. George Joseph Finnigan (1927–1932)
4. Ralph Leo Hayes (1933–1935), appointed Rector of the Pontifical North American College and Titular Bishop and later Bishop of Davenport
5. Joseph Michael Gilmore (1935–1962)
6. Raymond Gerhardt Hunthausen (1962–1975), appointed Archbishop of Seattle
7. Elden Francis Curtiss (1976–1993), appointed Archbishop of Omaha
8. Alexander Joseph Brunett (1994–1997), appointed Archbishop of Seattle
9. Robert C. Morlino (1999–2003), appointed Bishop of Madison
10. George Leo Thomas (2004–2018), appointed Bishop of Las Vegas and later elevated to Archbishop
11. Austin Anthony Vetter (2019–present)

=== Other diocesan priests who became bishops ===
- Joseph Clement Willging, Bishop of the Roman Catholic Diocese of Pueblo
- Bernard Joseph Topel, Bishop of the Roman Catholic Diocese of Spokane
- Jeffrey M. Fleming, Bishop of the Roman Catholic Diocese of Great Falls–Billings

== Education ==
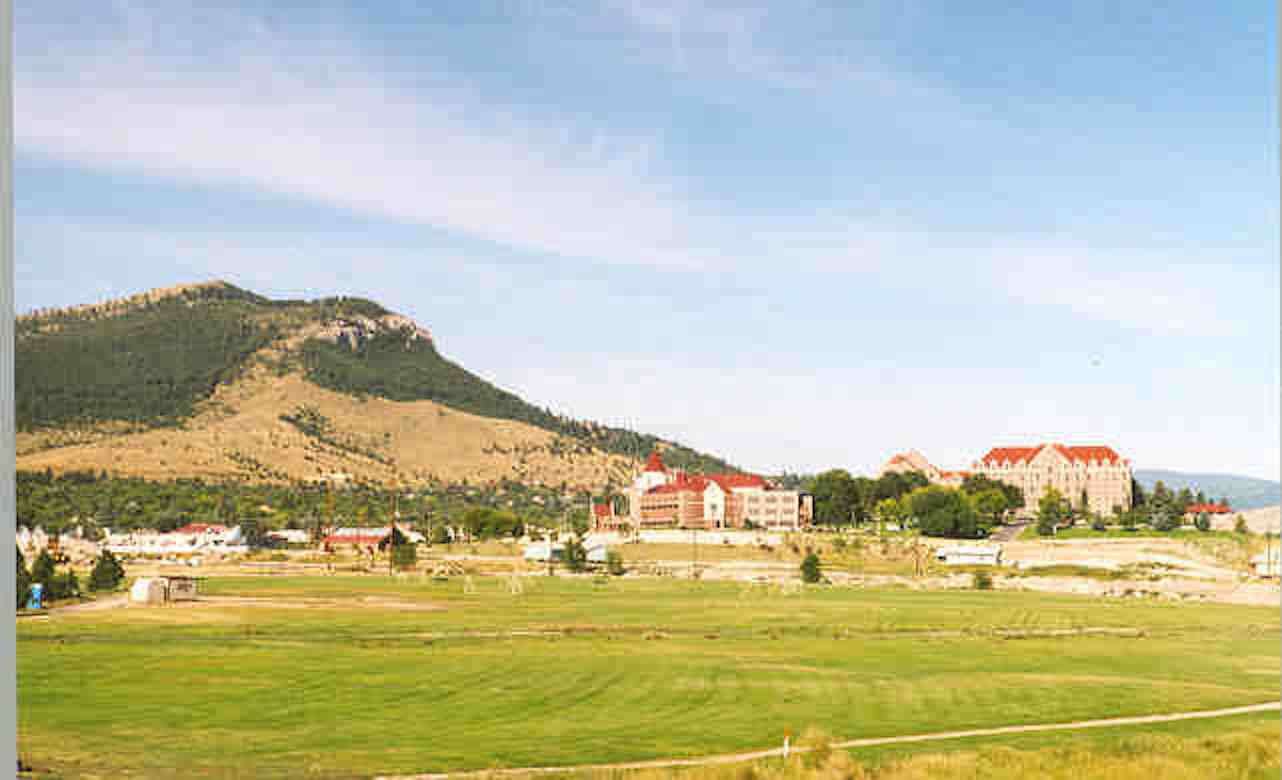
Carroll College, Helena, Montana (2002)

The Diocese of Helena has one college, three high schools and six primary schools. The total non-college enrollment as of 2023 was 1,150 students.

=== Higher education ===
Carroll College – Helena

=== High schools ===
- Butte Central Catholic High School – Butte
- Loyola Sacred Heart High School – Missoula
- St. Andrew School – Helena

=== Elementary schools ===
- Butte Central Elementary – Butte
- De La Salle Blackfeet School – Browning
- St. Andrew School – Helena
- St. Joseph Catholic School – Missoula
- St. Matthew Elementary – Kalispell

Coat of arms of Diocese of Helena
| Notes Arms was designed and adopted when the diocese was erected Adopted 1884 Escutcheon The diocesan arms consists of a field of alternating silver (white) and green chevrons. On this field are the conjoined cross and a crown. Symbolism The chevrons represent the mountain peaks in the diocese. The conjoined represent Helen, empress and mother of Constantine the Great, patroness of the diocese. |
