= Jovan Šljivančanin =

Serbian basketball player (born 1999)

Personal information
- Born: 19 February 1999 (age 27) Belgrade, Serbia, FR Yugoslavia
- Listed height: 1.96 m (6 ft 5 in)
- Listed weight: 95 kg (209 lb)

Career information
- High school: Trinity International (Las Vegas, Nevada)
- College: Carroll (Montana) (2018–2022)
- NBA draft: 2022: undrafted
- Playing career: 2022–present
- Position: Small forward / shooting guard

Career history
- 2022: Mega Basket
- 2022–2023: Minsk
- 2023–2024: Dynamic
- 2024: Minsk
- 2024: KK Joker
- 2024-2025: KK Vršac
- 2025: MBK Handlová

Career highlights
- Belarusian Premier League champion (2023); NAIA D1 All-American First Team (2022); Frontier Conference Player of the Year (2022)

Jovan Šljivančanin (Serbian Cyrillic: Јован Шљиванчанин; born 16 February 1999) is a Serbian professional basketball player. He played college basketball for the Carroll College Fighting Saints.

== Early career ==
Šljivančanin grew up playing basketball in Belgrade for youth systems of Partizan and Beovuk before he moved to Las Vegas, U.S. at age 16.

== College career ==
Šljivančanin played college basketball for the Carroll College Fighting Saints from 2018 to 2022. He graduated with a business management degree. As a senior, he averaged 19.5 points, 10.9 rebounds, and 3.3 assists per game. He racked up 20 double-doubles in his final season, finishing with 52 for his career. Šljivančanin was tabbed first team All-American, becoming just the fifth Carroll men's basketball player to do so, and earned Frontier Conference Player of the Year honors.

Šljivančanin finished his career ranked fifth on the all-time scoring list with 1,940 points. He pulled down over 1,100 career rebounds, shot better than 47% from the field, and averaged 15.3 points, nine rebounds and 2.4 assists per game in his four years at Carroll. Also, Carroll won two regular-season championships with him on the roster and played in four consecutive Frontier Tournament Championship games. Carroll qualified for the NAIA Men's Basketball Championships all four years, advancing to the championship game his freshman year and to the quarterfinals his junior season.

== Professional career ==
In July 2022, Šljivančanin signed a contract with Mega Basket of the ABA League and the Basketball League of Serbia (KLS).

On 2 December 2022, Šljivančanin signed for Minsk of the Belarus Premier League and the VTB United League.

In November 2023, Šljivančanin signed for Dynamic of the KLS. His stint with Dynamic didn't last long and he returned to Minsk on 29 February 2024.

On July 14, 2025, he signed with MBK Handlová. In November 2025, he was waived by MBK Handlová after playing in 6 games where he averaged 13 points, 7.8 rebounds, and 2.3 assists.
