= Jean-Baptiste Brondel =

Belgian-born prelate

His Excellency, The Right Reverend Jean-Baptiste Brondel
- Bishop of Helena
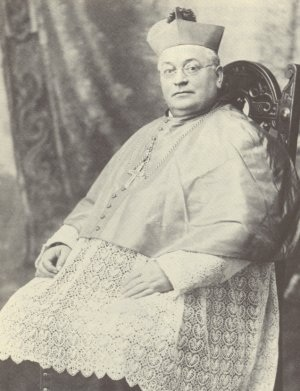
- Church: Roman Catholic Church
- See: Diocese of Helena
- Successor: John Patrick Carroll

Orders
- Ordination: 17 December 1864 by Engelbert Sterckx
- Consecration: 14 December 1879 by Charles J. Seghers

Personal details
- Born: 23 February 1842 Bruges, Belgium
- Died: 3 November 1903 (aged 61) Helena, Montana, US
- Education: American College of Louvain; College of St. Louis
- Motto: Victoria fides (Victory with faith)

Jean-Baptiste Brondel (23 February 1842 – 3 November 1903) was a Belgian-born prelate of the Catholic Church. He served as bishop of the Diocese of Vancouver Island in British Columbia and Alaska (1879–1883) and as vicar apostolic and bishop of the Diocese of Helena in Montana (1884–1903).

== Biography ==
=== Early life ===
Jean-Baptiste Brondel was born on 23 February 1842 in Bruges in the Kingdom of Belgium to Charles Joseph and Isabella (née Becquet) Brondel. One of seven children, Jean-Baptiste was the youngest of his parents' five sons; his eldest brother and one of his sisters also pursued religious careers. He received his early education from the Xaverian Brothers in his native city. In 1852, Brondel entered the College of St. Louis in Bruges, where he studied for ten years. Inspired by the works of the missionary Reverend Pierre-Jean De Smet in the American West, Brondel decided to become a missionary to the Native American peoples. He then studied philosophy and theology at the American College of Louvain in Leuven, Belgium.

=== Priesthood ===
Brondel was ordained to the priesthood in Mechelen, Belgium, by Cardinal Engelbert Sterckx on 17 December 1864. At age 24, he was below the age requirement for ordination, but was granted a dispensation by Pope Pius IX. He continued his studies at the American College for two more years.

Brondel arrived at Vancouver in the Washington Territory of the United States in 1866. At that time, the territory was part of the Diocese of Nesqually. The diocese assigned him to teach at Holy Angels College in Vancouver. He was then transferred after 12 months to Steilacoom, Washington, to serve as rector of its church and mission for the next ten years. During his tenure in Steilacoom, Brondel also built churches in Tacoma and Olympia, both in Washington. Brondel was transferred to Walla Walla, Washington, in 1877, but returned to Steilacoom the following year.

=== Bishop of Vancouver Island ===
On 26 September 1879, Brondel was appointed the third bishop of Vancouver Island by Pope Leo XIII. He received his episcopal consecration at Saint Andrew's Cathedral in Victoria, British Columbia, on 14 December 1879 from Archbishop Charles J. Seghers. The diocese included Vancouver Island, a part of British Columbia, as well as Alaska, an American territory.

=== Vicar Apostolic of Montana ===
On 7 April 1883, Leo XIII named Brondel as vicar apostolic of Montana.

=== Bishop of Helena ===
The vicariate was elevated to the Diocese of Helena on 7 March 1884 by Leo XIII, with Brondel becoming its first bishop. At that time, the diocese included the entire Montana Territory.

During his tenure, Brondel traveled throughout the territory, establishing several new parishes and building churches. He also significantly increased the number of priests; by 1903, the number of seminarians in Montana increased from one to thirteen. He took a particular interest in the evangelization of Native Americans. The United States government often used his popularity among that community to further its aims in the community.

Jean-Baptiste Brondel died on 23 February 1842 at Helena at age 61, and was buried in a vault under the cathedral of that city.

Catholic Church titles
Preceded by none (diocese erected)	Bishop of Helena; 1884–1903	Succeeded by John Patrick Carroll
Preceded by –	Vicar Apostolic of Montana; 1883–1884	Succeeded by none
Preceded by Charles-Jean Seghers	Bishop of Vancouver Island; 1879–1883	Succeeded by Charles-Jean Seghers
