= Cathedral of Saint Helena =

Historic church in Montana, United States

- U.S. National Register of Historic Places
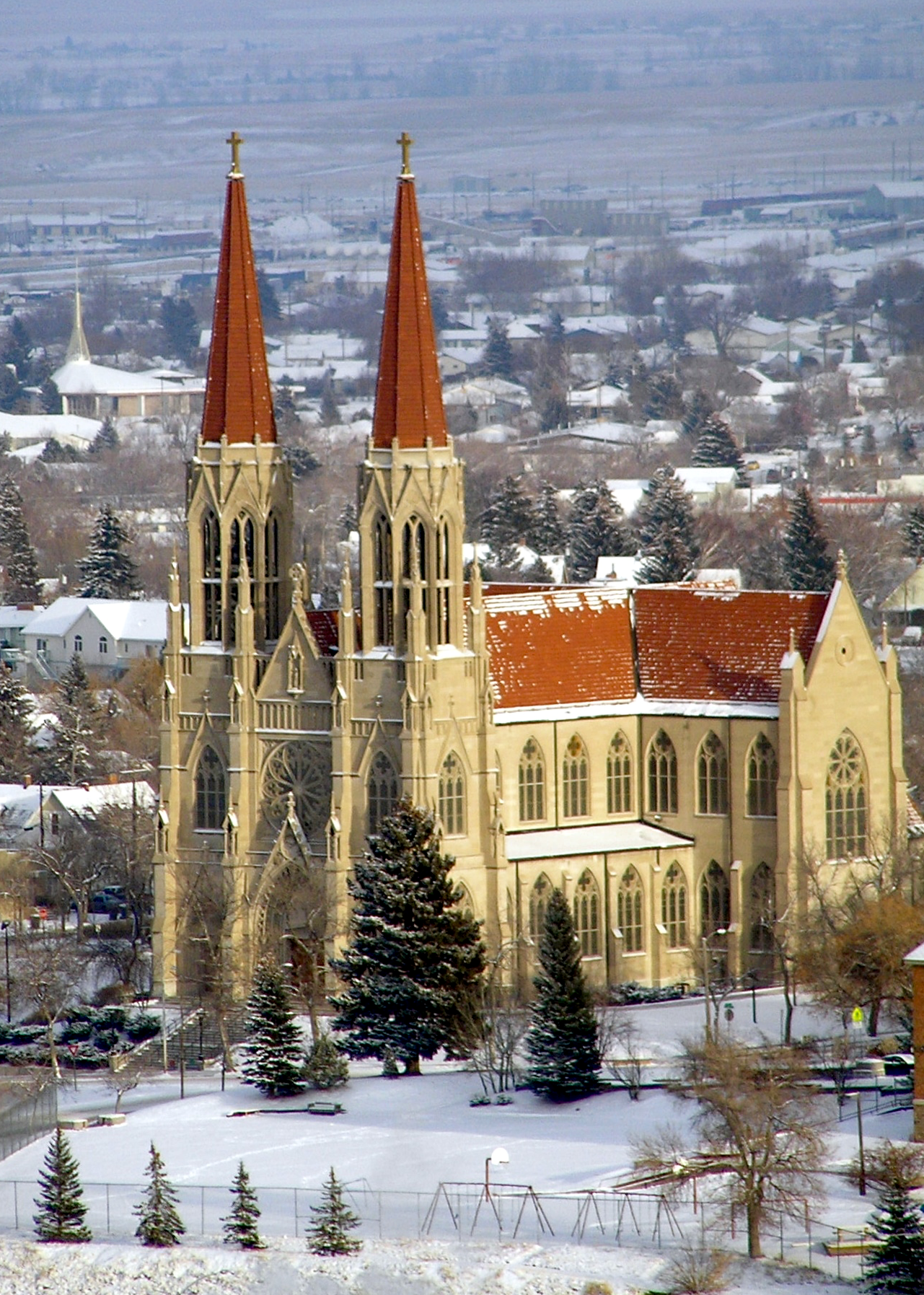
- Location: 530 N. Ewing St. Helena, Montana, U.S.
- Coordinates: 46°35′24.53″N 112°1′57.15″W
- Built: 1908
- Architect: A.O. Von Herbulis (Albert Olszewski)
- Architectural style: Gothic Revival
- NRHP reference No.: 80004270
- Added to NRHP: April 30, 1980

The Cathedral of Saint Helena is the cathedral of the Roman Catholic Diocese of Helena, Montana, United States. Modeled by architect A.O. Von Herbulis after the Votivkirche in Vienna, Austria, the construction began on the cathedral in 1908, and held its first mass in November 1914. Bishop John Patrick Carroll worked tirelessly to raise funds for building the cathedral and had an administrative role in management of the entire project. The cathedral sustained significant damage during the 1935 Helena earthquake, which required extensive renovations. The cathedral was added to the National Register of Historic Places in 1980.

== History ==
=== Construction ===
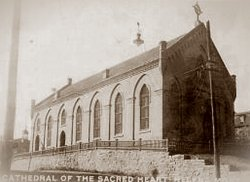
The Cathedral of the Sacred Hearts of Jesus and Mary, Helena's first cathedral.

The site for the cathedral was purchased with a $25,000 donation from Thomas Cruse in 1905. A.O. Von Herbulis of Washington, D.C., was commissioned as the architect. Von Herbulis was trained abroad and was chosen for his knowledge of the cathedrals of Europe. Rough sketches were prepared in two styles, Romanesque and Gothic. When the drawings were presented, the Building Committee chose the Gothic form; a motion to authorize that design passed unanimously. Von Herbulis modelled the cathedral after the Votivkirche in Vienna, Austria, which he had become familiar with while studying at university in Vienna.

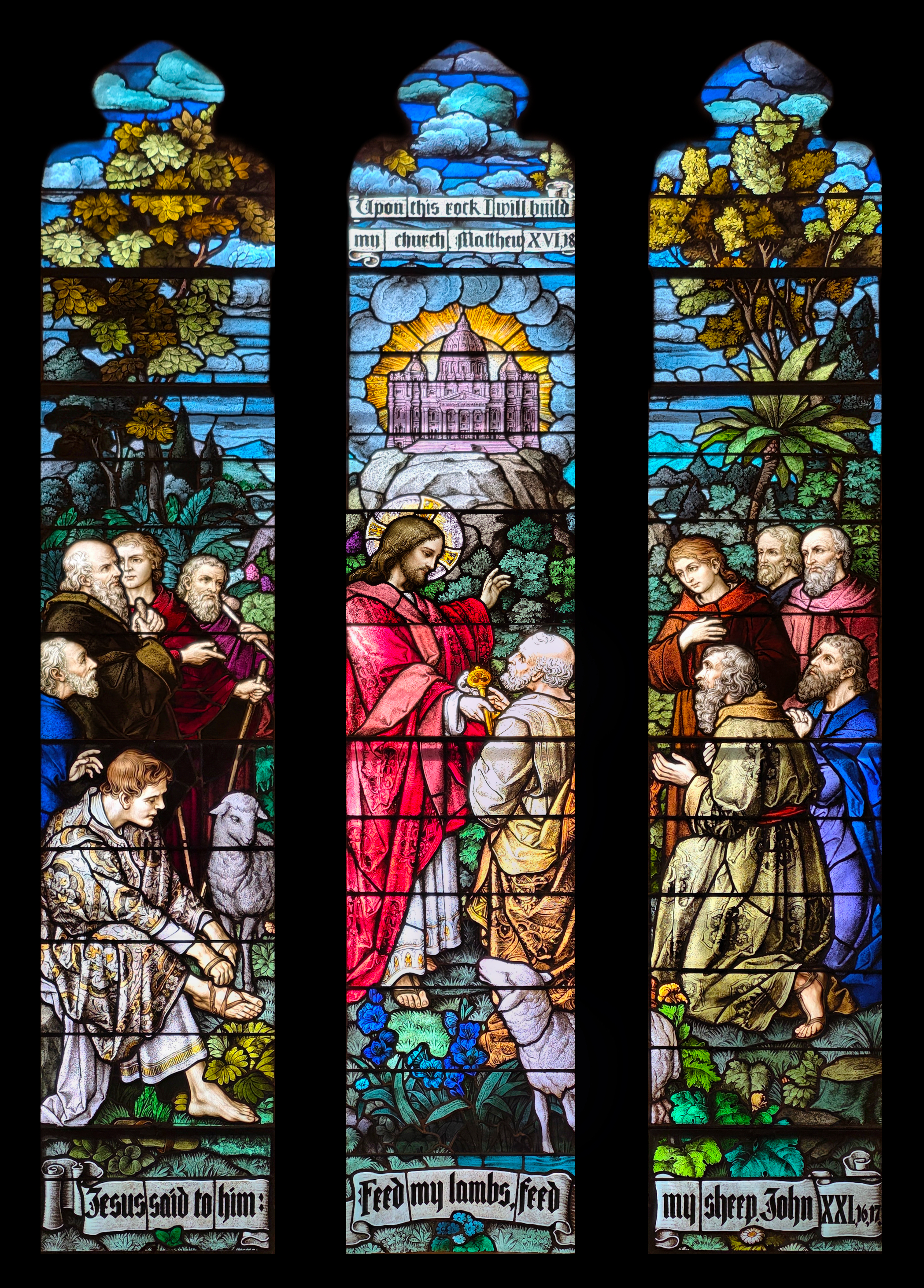
Christ's Commission to Peter by Franz Xaver Zettler

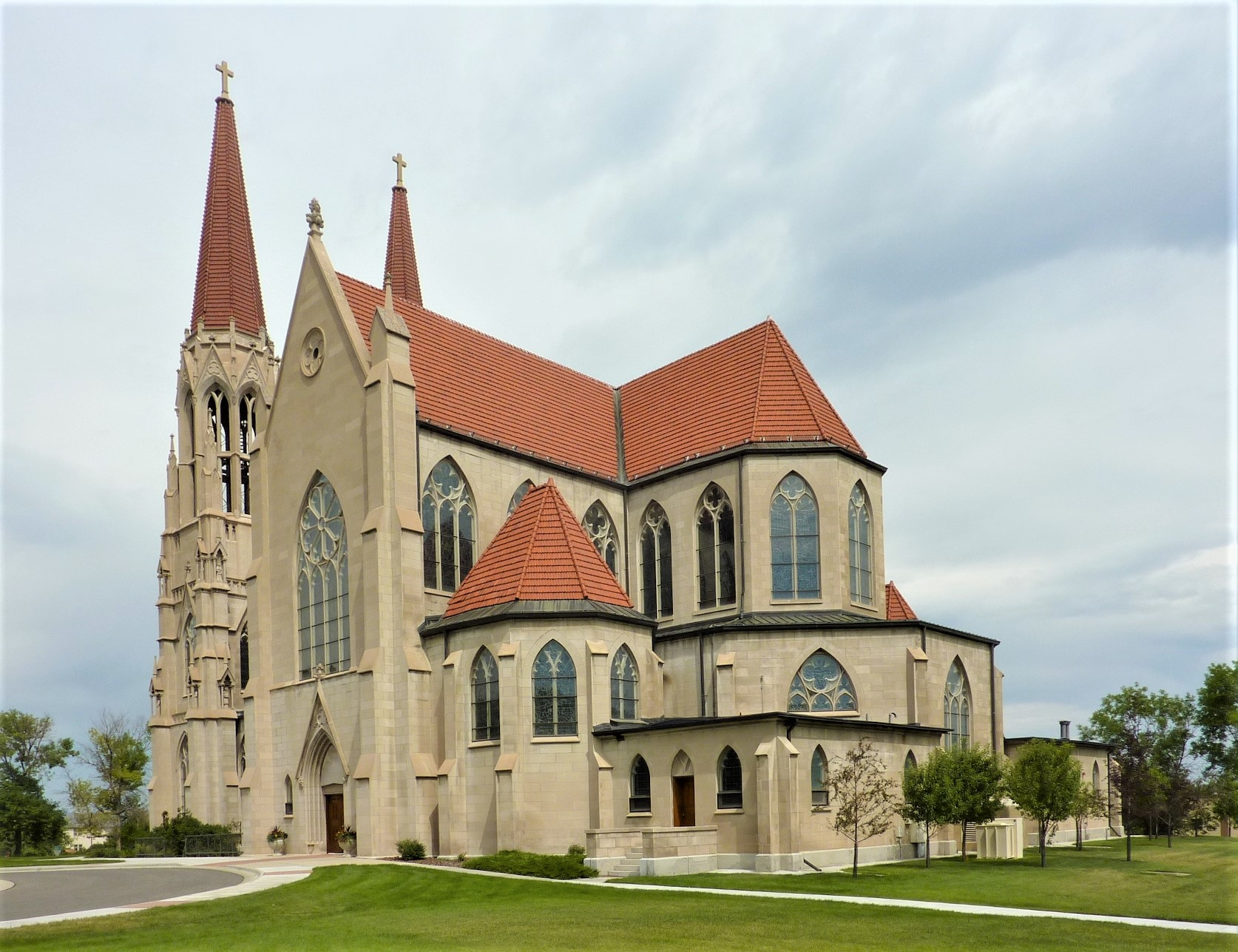
View from southeast.

The Columbia Construction Company of New York City began construction of the cathedral in 1908; the cornerstone was laid on October 4 that year. On November 8, 1914, the Catholic community of Helena gathered to celebrate Mass for the first time in the new church, and the first funeral held in the cathedral was that of Thomas Cruse, a benefactor, December 26, 1914. The cathedral remained under construction for ten more years; in June 1924, the cathedral was consecrated. Its total cost of construction amounted to $645,000.

The stained glass windows for the cathedral were made and installed by the F.X. Zettler Firm of Munich, Germany. By the time the cathedral was dedicated, 46 of the planned 59 windows had been installed. The Zettler Firm claimed that the 37-window set, which told the Christian story from the fall of Adam and Eve to the Church in the early years of the 20th century, surpassed any windows which it had made during its first 50 years. The remaining windows in the clerestory level were installed by 1926 by Charles J. Connick, a craftsman from Boston.

=== Renovations ===
In the fall of 1935, a series of earthquakes struck the state of Montana. The cathedral suffered damage: the south tower was almost completely destroyed. The tower was reconstructed and reinforced to prevent future calamity. The reconstruction was completed by 1938.

The interior of the cathedral remained unchanged from its dedication until the mid-1950s. Under the direction of Bishop Joseph M. Gilmore, the bronze altar canopy was installed. The grillwork behind the altar and the gilding of the interior were also added. The restoration was completed in April 1959 in time for the golden jubilee of the cathedral and the 75th anniversary of the Diocese of Helena.

The cathedral was renovated in 1982-1983 under the direction of Bishop Elden F. Curtiss. This renovation addressed the liturgical reform of the Second Vatican Council. Extensive repairs to the stained glass windows were also undertaken by the late Fr. Daniel Hillen.

In 1999-2000 repairs to the interior columns were completed. The columns had been damaged in the Montana Rail Link train crash of February 1989.

The most recent renovation of the cathedral, begun in 2002 under the direction of Bishop Robert C. Morlino, continues under Bishop George Leo Thomas. Both the upper and lower levels of the cathedral were renovated. The lower level was completely remodeled to include two new social halls and a complete kitchen. The lower level was named in honor of the first bishop of Helena, John B. Brondel. The upper-level renovation included the sanctuary, Saint Joseph's Chapel, new baptistry, and the installation of the elevator in the north transept for improved access between levels.

Physical plant enhancements include a new heating system, a renovated chime system, a renovated and enhanced pipe organ, the restoration of the stained glass and re-covering of their exterior surfaces, the installation of a new sound system, the construction of a new confessional, the removal of the old St. Helena Grade School, the construction and landscaping of a new main parking lot, and the exterior upgrade to the Faith Formation/Office building.

== Architectural features ==
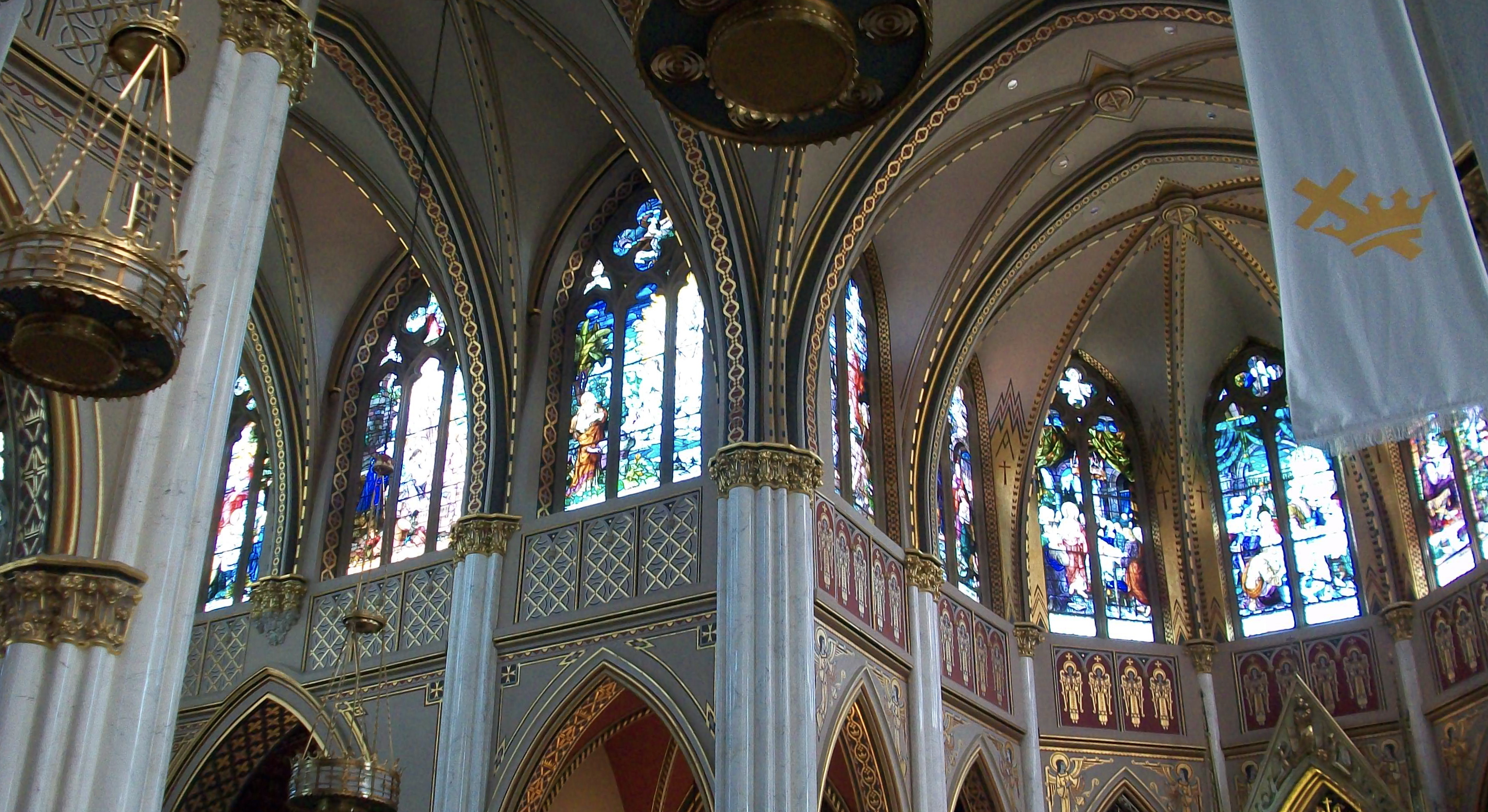
Detail of the crossing and apse

The cathedral's most prominent feature is its 230-foot (70 m) twin spires, which were directly inspired by the Votivkirche in Vienna. Adorning the spires are gold-leafed crosses that stand 12 feet (3.7 m) in height and 6 feet (1.8 m) in length. The cathedral's North tower contains fifteen hand-cast bells, which represent the fifteen mysteries of the Rosary. The church's limestone exterior also features 29 statues of saints and other figures.

== Airplane flight ==
For decades there was a rumor, long thought to be apocryphal, that a small plane flew between both spires in 1945.

In 2011, Raynor Roberts revealed the story was true and that he was the one who did it. He flew a P-51 Mustang between the spires, which are 60 feet apart. The Mustang's wingspan is 37 feet, so for Roberts, a highly-decorated World War II USAAF pilot, it was not difficult. (He also flew under the Bay Bridge in 1943 and over the Rose Bowl during the game on January 1, 1944.)

== See also ==
- List of Catholic cathedrals in the United States
- List of cathedrals in the United States

== Bibliography ==
- Day, Victor (1938). The Cathedral of Saint Helena. The Standard Publishing Company.
- Regan, Brian (2012). Gothic Pride: The Story of Building a Great Cathedral in Newark. Rutgers University Press. ISBN 978-0-813-55288-0.
- Spencer, Patricia C. (2002). Helena, Montana: The Queen City of the Rockies and the Broadwater Hotel. Arcadia Publishing. ISBN 978-0-738-51898-5.
