= Holy Family Old Cathedral (Anchorage, Alaska) =

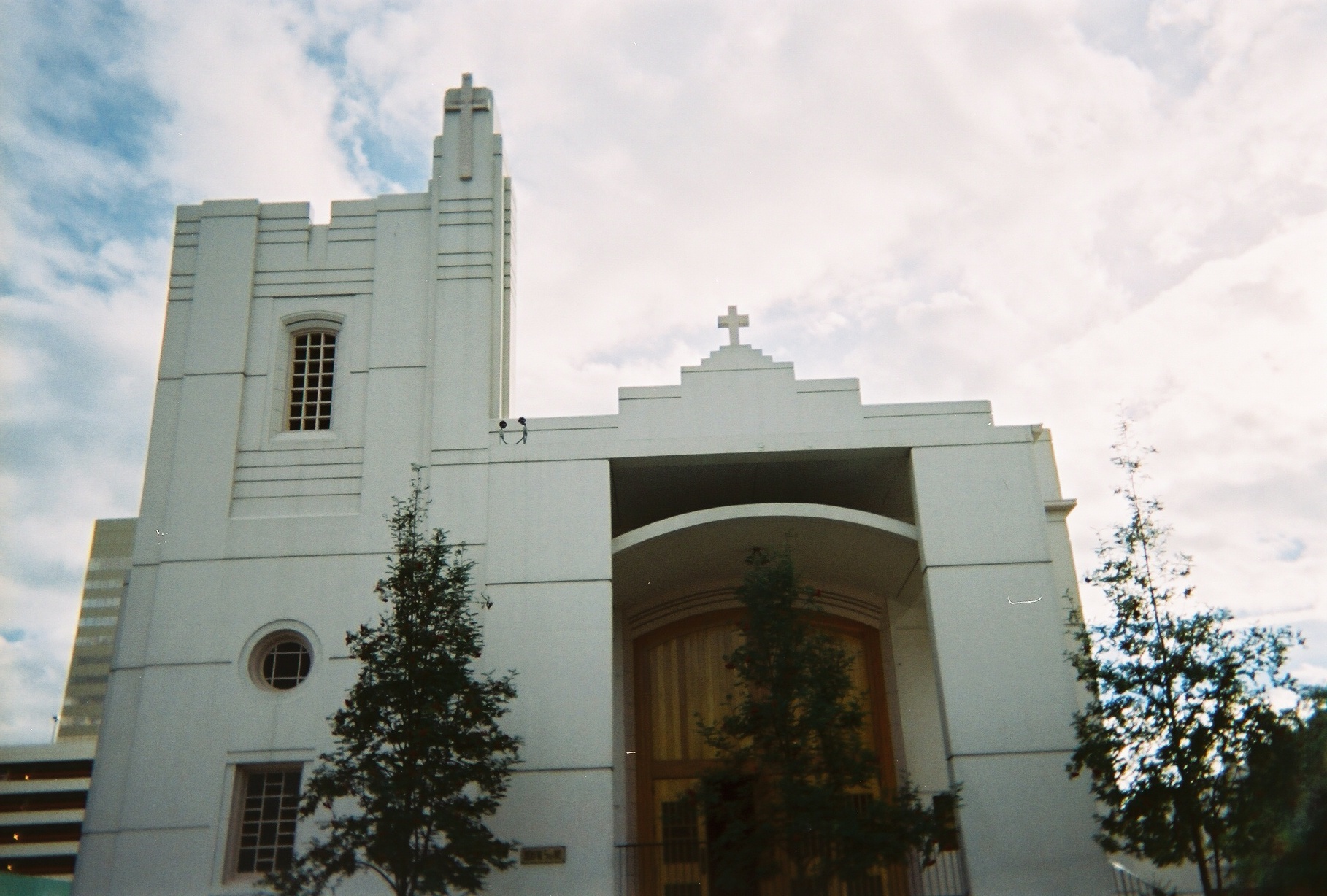
- Holy Family Old Cathedral, Anchorage

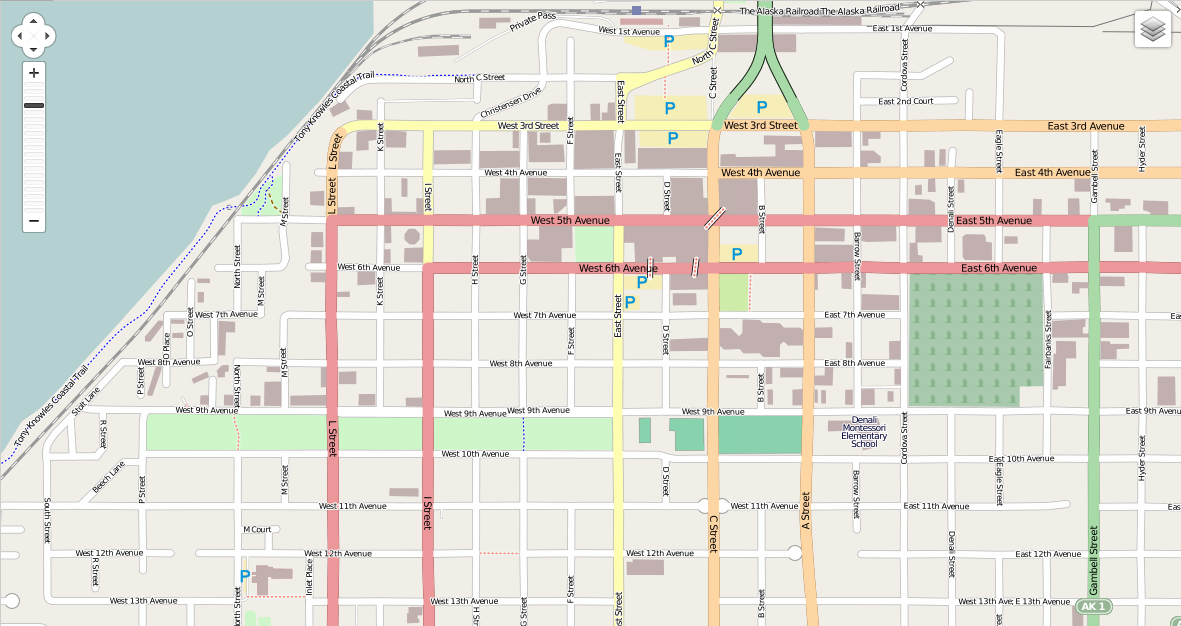
- Location in Anchorage Location in Alaska
- 61°13′2.53″N 149°53′52.69″W
- Location: 811 W. Sixth Ave. Anchorage, Alaska
- Country: United States
- Denomination: Roman Catholic Church
- Website: www.holyfamilyalaska.org

History
- Founded: 1915

Architecture
- Architect(s): Augustine A. Porreca; McEntire and Pendergast
- Style: Art Deco
- Groundbreaking: 1946
- Completed: 1948

Administration
- Archdiocese: Anchorage–Juneau

Clergy
- Archbishop: Andrew E. Bellisario
- Vicar(s): Fr. Pius Youn, O.P. Fr. Matthew Heynen, O.P.
- Pastor(s): Fr. James Junipero Moore, O.P.

Holy Family Old Cathedral, located in the commercial downtown section of Anchorage, Alaska in United States of America, was the cathedral and mother church of former Roman Catholic Archdiocese of Anchorage from the erection of that archdiocese 1966 to its canonical suppression in 2020. Growth of the city rendered the cathedral too small for major cathedral functions, leading to official elevation of Our Lady of Guadalupe Church as a co-cathedral for the Archdiocese of Anchorage in 2014.

When Pope Francis erected the Archdiocese of Anchorage-Juneau with the combined territory of the former Archdiocese of Anchorage and the former Diocese of Juneau, canonically suppressing both former jurisdictions, in 2020, he designated Our Lady of Guadalupe Co-Cathedral as the principal cathedral and the Cathedral of the Nativity of the Blessed Virgin Mary in Juneau, Alaska, which had served as the cathedral of the Diocese of Juneau, as the co-cathedral of the new jurisdiction. Holy Family Church thus ceased to be a cathedral, but continues to serve as a parish church of the Archdiocese of Anchorage–Juneau.

== History ==
Holy Family Parish was established the same year as the city of Anchorage. In 1915 the priest John Vander Pol was sent to Alaska to investigate the need for a parish in the new settlement. A. J. Wendler acquired two lots for the new parish in an auction for $175. Pol designed a simple wood-frame building with a veneer of ornamental cement block that measured 24 feet (7 m) by 48 feet (15 m) feet. It was built for $1,400. Construction of the new church was begun in September 1915 and completed on December 15 of the same year. It was the first church building constructed in Anchorage.

The congregation quickly outgrew their new church and plans were made early on to replace it. Funding a new structure proved difficult, however, and it was several decades before they could afford to build a larger church building. It was during the pastorate of Robert O'Flanagan that the present church was built. Seattle architect Augustine A. Porreca was chosen to design the new church. Work began on the structure in 1946. The first mass was celebrated in the unfinished basement on December 14, 1947. The parish was able to use the main church by the end of the following year. O'Flanagan became Bishop of Juneau in 1951. The church's interior was completed the following year.

On Good Friday of 1964, an earthquake with a magnitude of 9.2 devastated much of South Central Alaska. The Pope's apostolic delegate came to view the damage, and upon doing so he saw that Anchorage would be the focal point of both state and spiritual growth. In 1966, the Holy See created the Archdiocese of Anchorage, and made Alaska a separate province. Archbishop Joseph T. Ryan was installed as the first Archbishop of Anchorage on April 14, 1966. Holy Family church became a cathedral with the establishment of the new archdiocese.

The original main entrance into the cathedral was along the side of the building through the tower. The architectural firm of McEntire and Pendergast designed a new portico of the main facade. It features two pairs of doors with oversized transoms that replaced a large window. The exterior had been a natural gray color from the time of its construction. In 1970 it was painted off-white. Ryan invited the Order of Preachers (Dominicans) to staff the cathedral in 1974.

The cathedral was the host church for the 1981 visit of Pope John Paul II to Anchorage, which attracted a crowd estimated at 80,000 people. The Pope held a papal audience in the cathedral, and a similar audience for the handicapped in the basement during his visit.

Because of growth in the archdiocese and the limitations of its downtown location, it was decided that Holy Family was no longer a practical location for many liturgical functions of the archdiocese. Archbishop Roger Schwietz petitioned the Holy See in 2013 to have Our Lady of Guadalupe Church named a co-cathedral and Holy Family maintained as the historic cathedral. In October 2014, the petition was approved and Our Lady of Guadalupe was elevated to co-cathedral status on December 14 of that year.

In 2020, Pope Francis canonically suppressed the Archdiocese of Anchorage and the Diocese of Juneau and erected the new Archdiocese of Anchorage-Juneau with their combined territory. The Papal bull, which established the new archdiocese, designated Our Lady of Guadalupe as its cathedral and the Nativity of the Blessed Virgin Mary in Juneau as its co-cathedral. Holy Family ceased being the cathedral at that time and was given the title "Old Cathedral."

== See also ==
- List of Catholic cathedrals in the United States
- List of cathedrals in the United States
