= Cathedral of Our Lady of Guadalupe (Alaska) =

Catholic cathedral in Alaska, US

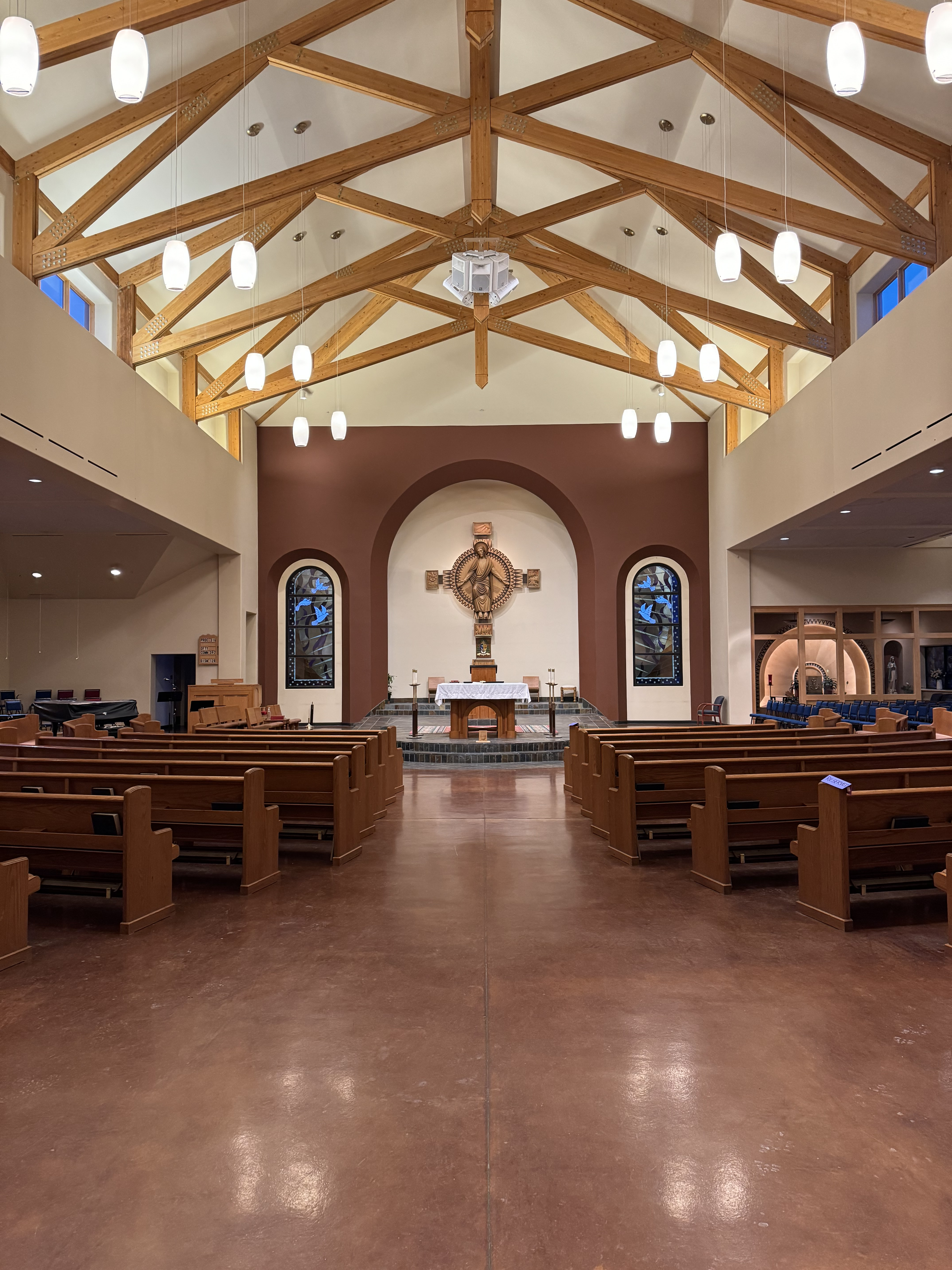
- Interior in 2024

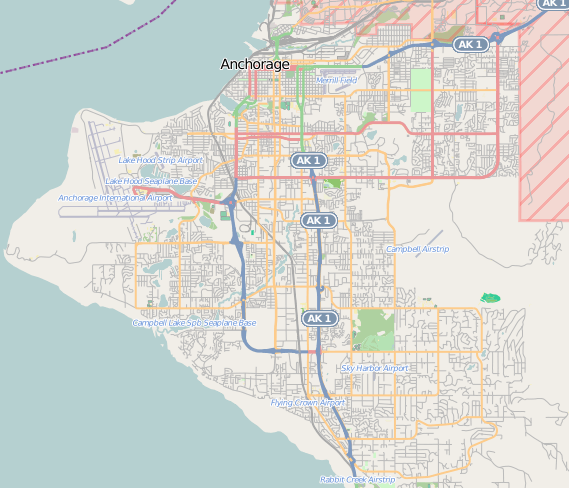
- Location in Anchorage Location in Alaska
- 61°11′5.74″N 149°56′38.56″W
- Location: 3900 Wisconsin St. Anchorage, Alaska
- Country: United States
- Denomination: Catholic Church
- Sui iuris church: Latin Church
- Website: www.olgak.org

History
- Status: Cathedral/Parish
- Dedication: Our Lady of Guadalupe
- Dedicated: 2005

Architecture
- Architect: Architects Alaska
- Style: Mission Revival

Administration
- Archdiocese: Anchorage-Juneau

Clergy
- Archbishop: Andrew E. Bellisario, C.M.
- Rector: Rev. David Nations, C.M.
- Vicar(s): Rev. Socrate Laupe, C.M.

Cathedral of Our Lady of Guadalupe of the Catholic Church is located in Anchorage, Alaska, United States. It is the cathedral and a parish church of the Archdiocese of Anchorage–Juneau. Our Lady of Guadalupe is the seat of the archbishop along with the Co-Cathedral of the Nativity of the Blessed Virgin Mary, in Juneau. From 2014 to 2020 Our Lady of Guadalupe was the co-cathedral of the Archdiocese of Anchorage.

== History ==
Our Lady of Guadalupe parish was established in the 1970s. The congregation originally met in a Methodist church until they could afford to build a multi-purpose building that included worship space. The present church was designed by Architects Alaska in the Spanish Mission Revival style and completed in 2005.

Because of growth in the archdiocese and the limitations of its downtown location, it was decided that Holy Family Cathedral was no longer a practical location for many liturgical functions of the archdiocese. Archbishop Roger Schwietz, OMI petitioned the Holy See in 2013 to have Our Lady of Guadalupe Church named a co-cathedral and Holy Family maintained as the historic cathedral. In October 2014 the petition was approved. On the feast of Our Lady of Guadalupe, December 12, 2014, the parish church was elevated to a cathedral. Archbishop Schwietz presided at the liturgy that was also attended by Archbishop Carlo Maria Viganò, the Apostolic Nuncio to the United States, Archbishop Emeritus Francis Hurley, and Bishops Edward J. Burns of Juneau and Chad Zielinski of Fairbanks. The cathedra installed in the church was the chair used by Pope John Paul II when he celebrated Mass in Anchorage in 1981. A new metropolitan cross, carved from a linden tree, was created for the co-cathedral at the time of its elevation.

In 2020, Pope Francis canonically suppressed the Archdiocese of Anchorage and the Diocese of Juneau and erected the new Archdiocese of Anchorage-Juneau with their combined territory. In a liturgy on September 17, 2020, inaugurating the new archdiocese, the Apostolic Nuncio to the United States read the Papal bull, which designated Our Lady of Guadalupe as its cathedral and the Nativity of the Blessed Virgin Mary in Juneau as its co-cathedral.

== See also ==
- List of Catholic cathedrals in the United States
- List of cathedrals in the United States
