= National Shrine of St. Thérèse, Juneau =

Coordinates: 58°28′20″N 134°47′14″W

National Shrine of St. Thérèse
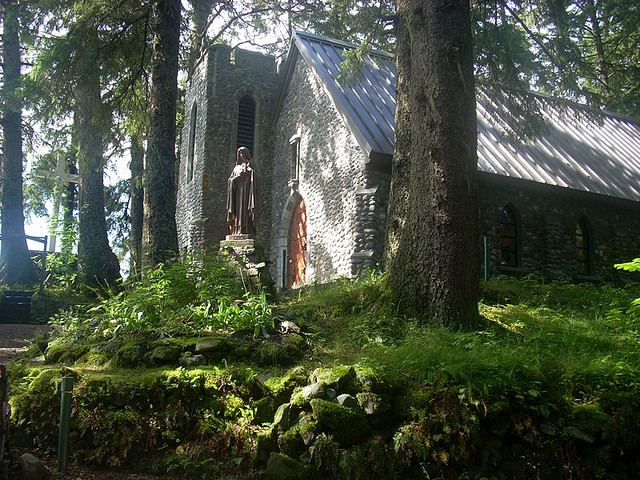
- National Shrine of St. Thérèse
- Location: 21425 Glacier Hwy; Juneau, Alaska 99801
- Country: United States
- Denomination: Roman Catholic

History
- Status: National Shrine
- Founded: 1932
- Founder(s): Bishop Crimont, S.J. Father LeVasseur, S.J.
- Consecrated: 1941

Administration
- Archdiocese: Anchorage-Juneau
- Parish: St. Paul the Apostle

Clergy
- Priest: Fr. Michael Galbraith

The National Shrine of St. Thérèse overlooks the Lynn Canal in Juneau, Alaska, US. Situated on 46 acres (19 ha) of land, the site contains a stone chapel, crypt, labyrinth, columbarium, lodge, cabin, and retreat.

== History ==
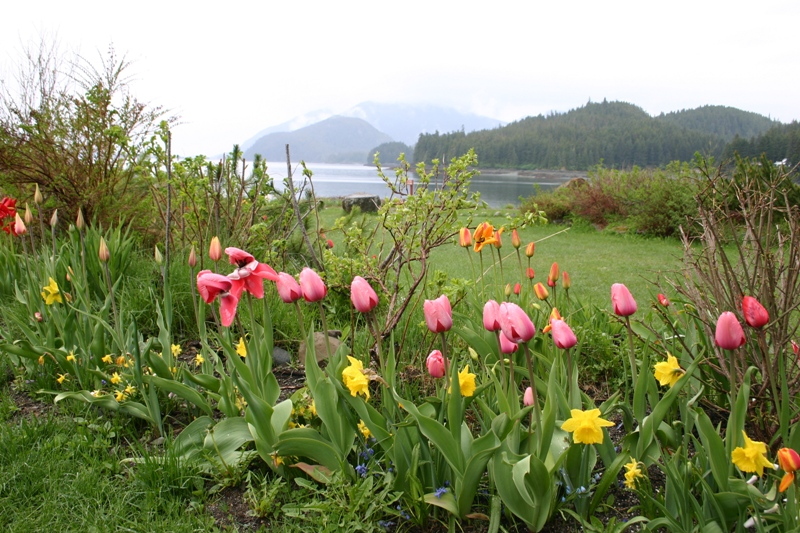
The grounds

In 1925, St. Thérèse of Lisieux was named the patroness of Alaska. In the 1930s, Father William LeVasseur, a Jesuit priest, came up with the idea of a retreat center in her name. Bishop Joseph Raphael John Crimont provided support for its establishment, buying federal land. Thousands of stones, gathered by volunteers, were used to construct the chapel and other structures. The first Mass was held in 1941. In 1945, Bishop Crimont died and was buried at the shrine's crypt.

In 1953, Bishop Robert Dermot O'Flanagan started the League of the Little Flower to help make the shrine self-sufficient. The shrine fell into disrepair and stopped holding retreats in the 1960s but underwent renovation under the leadership of Fr. James Manske from 1968 to 1969. For financial reasons, the shrine was forced to close in 1985 but reopened the following year after 25 locals came together to save the shrine.

In 1998, the columbarium was built and is open to all Christians who want their cremains placed at the shrine. In 2000, a new cabin was built to commemorate the Great Jubilee, and in 2001, the Merciful Love Labyrinth was built.

On October 1, 2016, Bishop Edward J. Burns announced that the Shrine of St. Thérèse had been raised to the status of national shrine.

== Attractions ==
The retreat was closed for a time, but in March 1986, the National Shrine of Saint Teresa was reopened. Thomas Fitterer took over as Director of the Sanctuary and was instrumental in bringing it back from the brink of abandonment. Under his direction, the Shrine added several attractions: the Columbarium (in 1998), the Rosary Walk (in 1999), the Jubilee Hut (in 2000), the Little Flower Hut and the Labyrinth of Merciful Love (both in 2001).
