= List of Catholic dioceses in the United States =

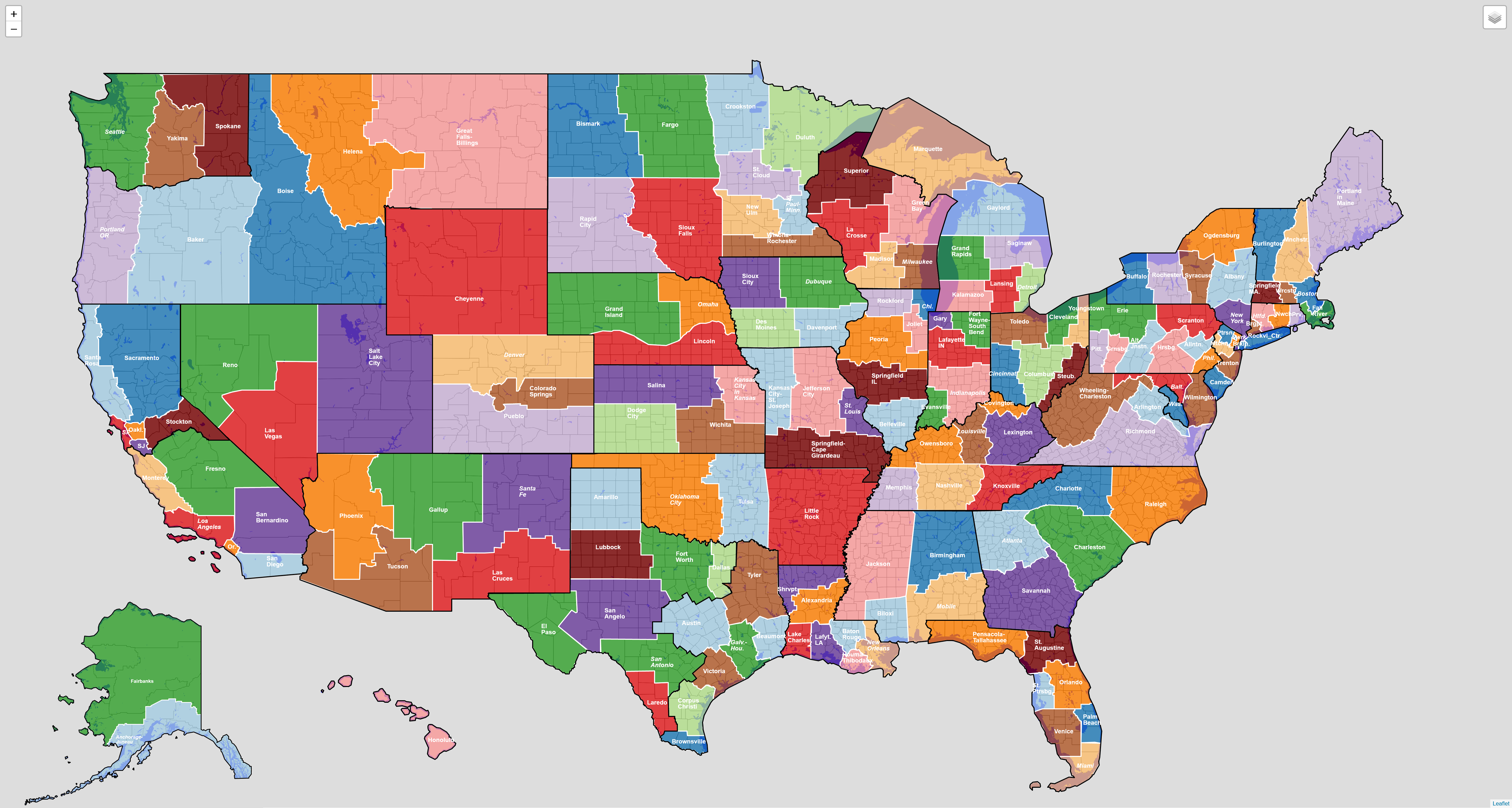
Dioceses of the Catholic Church in the United States. White borders demarcate Latin Church dioceses, and black borders demarcate Latin Church provinces.

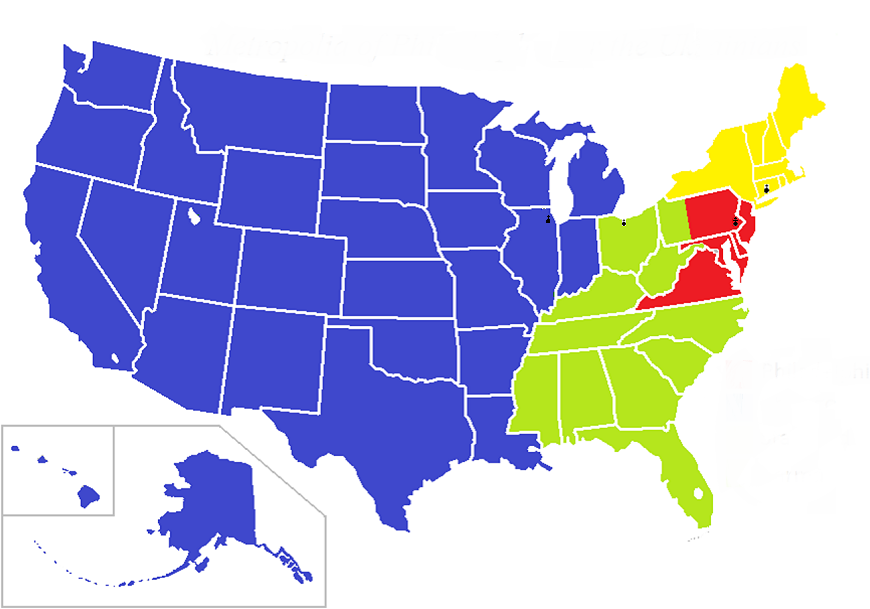
Ukrainian Catholic Archeparchy and Eparchies.

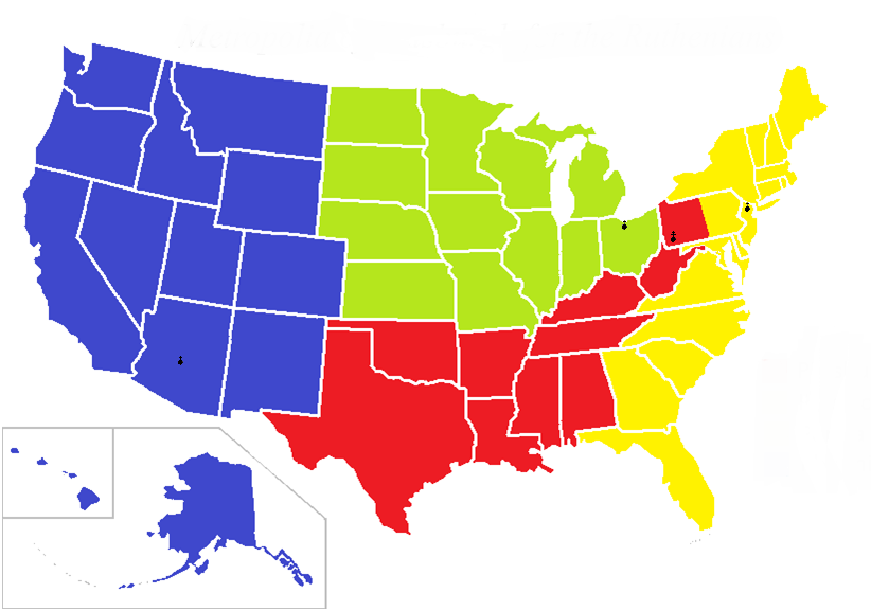
Ruthenian Catholic Archeparchy and Eparchies.

The Catholic dioceses and archdioceses of the United States which include both the dioceses of the Latin Church, which employ the Roman Rite and other Latin liturgical rites, and various other dioceses, primarily the eparchies of the Eastern Catholic Churches, which employ various Eastern Christian rites and traditions, and which are in full communion with the Pope in Rome. The Archdiocese for the Military Services, USA is not a metropolitan diocese. The Personal Ordinariate of the Chair of Saint Peter, with territory that extends over the United States and Canada, was established on January 1, 2012, for former Anglicans who join the Catholic Church.

The Catholic Church in the United States has a total of 196 particular churches in the 50 U.S. states, Washington D.C., and the U.S. Virgin Islands: 33 territorial archdioceses, 143 territorial dioceses, the Archdiocese for the Military Services, USA (serving members of the US Armed Forces and Diplomatic Corps, and those in facilities of the Veterans Administration and their dependents), and the Personal Ordinariate of the Chair of Saint Peter (serving Catholics who were formerly Anglicans) within the Latin Church; and two archeparchies and 16 eparchies in the Eastern Catholic Churches.

There are several other dioceses whose territories cover the United States' unincorporated territories. Puerto Rico has one ecclesiastical province comprising an archdiocese and five dioceses, which together form the Puerto Rican Episcopal Conference, which is separate from the United States Conference of Catholic Bishops. The dioceses that encompass American Samoa, the Northern Mariana Islands, and Guam are part of the Episcopal Conference of the Pacific.

== Terminology ==
The pastor of any particular church other than an ordinariate must be episcopally ordained, but his title conforms to that of his jurisdiction: the pastor of an archdiocese is an archbishop, the pastor of a diocese is a bishop, the pastor of an archeparchy is an archeparch, the pastor of an eparchy is an eparch, and the pastor of an exarchate is an exarch. The pastor of an ordinariate is an "ordinary" (which is a term also used generically for the pastor of any particular church) and may be either a bishop if celibate or a priest if married, but he holds the same power of governance of his ordinariate that an episcopal ordinary has in his diocese in either case; Pope Benedict XVI deliberately instituted this provision to permit married, former Anglican bishops who come into full communion with the Catholic Church along with many of their congregants to accede to office while respecting sensitivities in ecumenical relations with the Eastern Orthodox Churches, which also maintain a celibate episcopacy. The pastor of each particular church is, ex officio, a full member of the United States Conference of Catholic Bishops (USCCB). Auxiliary and retired bishops are also members of the Conference but have no vote.

In the United States, each archbishop — except the archbishop of the Archdiocese for the Military Services — is also the metropolitan bishop of an ecclesiastical province. Likewise, each archeparch is also the metropolitan of an ecclesiastical province that encompasses all of the eparchies of the same sui iuris particular church in the United States. Most provincial and diocesan boundaries conform to state, county, borough (in Alaska), or parish (in Louisiana) political boundaries. The sui iuris Ukrainian Greek Catholic Church in the US has an ecclesiastical province consisting of an archeparchy and three eparchies, and the sui iuris Ruthenian Greek Catholic Church has an ecclesiastical province consisting of an archeparchy and three eparchies; the boundaries of these jurisdictions also generally conform to those of states. Most of the remaining eparchies are national in territory, but two particular churches, namely the Armenian Catholic Eparchy of Our Lady of Nareg and the Personal Ordinariate of the Chair of Saint Peter, are international, encompassing all of the United States and Canada; their pastors also are ex officio members of the Canadian Conference of Catholic Bishops (CCCB).

In the Roman Rite, (arch)dioceses customarily take the name of the city of the (arch)bishop's cathedra, denominated the "see". A few dioceses bear the names of two cities, variously reflecting a shift in the major center of population, e.g., the Archdiocese of Galveston-Houston; future plan to divide a diocese, e.g., the former Diocese of Reno-Las Vegas; union of two former dioceses, e.g., the Diocese of Kansas City-St. Joseph; political expedience, e.g., the Archdiocese of St. Paul and Minneapolis; or a perceived need for some episcopal functions to be accessible to residents of another part of the diocesan territory, e.g., the Diocese of Altoona-Johnstown. Some of the sui iuris particular churches also follow this custom, while others denominated their jurisdictions after saints or other religious titles.

In the Catholic Church, there are many bishops who do not govern dioceses:

- A "coadjutor" is appointed to assist the bishop of a diocese or eparchy with its daily governance and has the right of automatic succession upon the death or resignation of the bishop. A coadjutor always holds the title "Coadjutor of [name of see]". The coadjutor of an archdiocese or archeparchy also has the status of an archbishop or archeparch.
- A retired diocesan bishop holds the title of "Bishop Emeritus of [name of see]" or, in the case of an archdiocese, "Archbishop Emeritus of [name of see]".
- Auxiliary bishops, bishops who govern jurisdictions that are not canonically erected as dioceses, bishops and archbishops of the Roman Curia, and bishops and archbishops of the diplomatic corps of the Holy See have titles of former dioceses and archdioceses.
- The Pope also may confer the personal title of "archbishop" on a diocesan bishop who does not govern an archdiocese; such a prelate is classified as an archbishop ad personam: although not the diocesan bishop of an archdiocese, he is titled with the name of a former archdiocese in addition to possessing the title of his own diocese.

When a diocese is suppressed or when the diocesan see is transferred to another location, the title of the former see becomes available for assignment to a titular bishop or, in the case of an archdiocese, a titular archbishop or an archbishop ad personam. The Vatican resurrected the names of many former sees of the United States in the 1990s, as indicated by the table of former dioceses toward the end of this article.

== Territorial provinces and dioceses ==
=== United States Conference of Catholic Bishops ===
Map	Diocese	Coat of Arms
Ecclesiastical Province of Anchorage–Juneau
	Archdiocese of Anchorage–Juneau	
	Diocese of Fairbanks	
Ecclesiastical Province of Atlanta
	Archdiocese of Atlanta	
	Diocese of Charleston	
	Diocese of Charlotte	
	Diocese of Raleigh	
	Diocese of Savannah	
Ecclesiastical Province of Baltimore
	Archdiocese of Baltimore	
	Diocese of Arlington	
	Diocese of Richmond	
	Diocese of Wheeling–Charleston	
	Diocese of Wilmington	
Ecclesiastical Province of Boston
	Archdiocese of Boston	
	Diocese of Burlington	
	Diocese of Fall River	
	Diocese of Manchester	
	Diocese of Portland	
	Diocese of Springfield in Massachusetts	
	Diocese of Worcester	
Ecclesiastical Province of Chicago
	Archdiocese of Chicago	
	Diocese of Belleville	
	Diocese of Joliet	
	Diocese of Peoria	
	Diocese of Rockford	
	Diocese of Springfield in Illinois	
Ecclesiastical Province of Cincinnati
	Archdiocese of Cincinnati	
	Diocese of Cleveland	
	Diocese of Columbus	
	Diocese of Steubenville	
	Diocese of Toledo in Ohio	
	Diocese of Youngstown	
Ecclesiastical Province of Denver
	Archdiocese of Denver	
	Diocese of Cheyenne	
	Diocese of Colorado Springs	
	Diocese of Pueblo	
Ecclesiastical Province of Detroit
	Archdiocese of Detroit	
	Diocese of Gaylord	
	Diocese of Grand Rapids	
	Diocese of Kalamazoo	
	Diocese of Lansing	
	Diocese of Marquette	
	Diocese of Saginaw	
Ecclesiastical Province of Dubuque
	Archdiocese of Dubuque	
	Diocese of Davenport	
	Diocese of Des Moines	
	Diocese of Sioux City	
Ecclesiastical Province of Galveston–Houston
	Archdiocese of Galveston–Houston	
	Diocese of Austin	
	Diocese of Beaumont	
	Diocese of Brownsville	
	Diocese of Corpus Christi	
	Diocese of Tyler	
	Diocese of Victoria	
Ecclesiastical Province of Hartford
	Archdiocese of Hartford	
	Diocese of Bridgeport	
	Diocese of Norwich	
	Diocese of Providence	
Ecclesiastical Province of Indianapolis
	Archdiocese of Indianapolis	
	Diocese of Evansville	
	Diocese of Fort Wayne–South Bend	
	Diocese of Gary	
	Diocese of Lafayette in Indiana	
Ecclesiastical Province of Kansas City
	Archdiocese of Kansas City in Kansas	
	Diocese of Dodge City	
	Diocese of Salina	
	Diocese of Wichita	
Ecclesiastical Province of Las Vegas
	Archdiocese of Las Vegas	
	Diocese of Reno	
	Diocese of Salt Lake City	
Ecclesiastical Province of Los Angeles
	Archdiocese of Los Angeles	
	Diocese of Fresno	
	Diocese of Monterey	
	Diocese of Orange	
	Diocese of San Bernardino	
	Diocese of San Diego	
Ecclesiastical Province of Louisville
	Archdiocese of Louisville	
	Diocese of Covington	
	Diocese of Knoxville	
	Diocese of Lexington	
	Diocese of Memphis	
	Diocese of Nashville	
	Diocese of Owensboro	
Ecclesiastical Province of Miami
	Archdiocese of Miami	
	Diocese of Orlando	
	Diocese of Palm Beach	
	Diocese of Pensacola–Tallahassee	
	Diocese of St. Augustine	
	Diocese of St. Petersburg	
	Diocese of Venice in Florida	
Ecclesiastical Province of Milwaukee
	Archdiocese of Milwaukee	
	Diocese of Green Bay	
	Diocese of La Crosse	
	Diocese of Madison	
	Diocese of Superior	
Ecclesiastical Province of Mobile
	Archdiocese of Mobile	
	Diocese of Biloxi	
	Diocese of Birmingham	
	Diocese of Jackson	
Ecclesiastical Province of New Orleans
	Archdiocese of New Orleans	
	Diocese of Alexandria	
	Diocese of Baton Rouge	
	Diocese of Houma–Thibodaux	
	Diocese of Lafayette in Louisiana	
	Diocese of Lake Charles	
	Diocese of Shreveport	
Ecclesiastical Province of New York
	Archdiocese of New York	
	Diocese of Albany	
	Diocese of Brooklyn	
	Diocese of Buffalo	
	Diocese of Ogdensburg	
	Diocese of Rochester	
	Diocese of Rockville Centre	
	Diocese of Syracuse	
Ecclesiastical Province of Newark
	Archdiocese of Newark	
	Diocese of Camden	
	Diocese of Metuchen	
	Diocese of Paterson	
	Diocese of Trenton	
Ecclesiastical Province of Oklahoma City
	Archdiocese of Oklahoma City	
	Diocese of Little Rock	
	Diocese of Tulsa	
Ecclesiastical Province of Omaha
	Archdiocese of Omaha	
	Diocese of Grand Island	
	Diocese of Lincoln	
Ecclesiastical Province of Philadelphia
	Archdiocese of Philadelphia	
	Diocese of Allentown	
	Diocese of Altoona–Johnstown	
	Diocese of Erie	
	Diocese of Greensburg	
	Diocese of Harrisburg	
	Diocese of Pittsburgh	
	Diocese of Scranton	
Ecclesiastical Province of Portland
	Archdiocese of Portland in Oregon	
	Diocese of Baker	
	Diocese of Boise	
	Diocese of Great Falls–Billings	
	Diocese of Helena	
Ecclesiastical Province of St. Louis
	Archdiocese of St. Louis	
	Diocese of Jefferson City	
	Diocese of Kansas City–Saint Joseph	
	Diocese of Springfield–Cape Girardeau	
Ecclesiastical Province of Saint Paul and Minneapolis
	Archdiocese of Saint Paul and Minneapolis	
	Diocese of Bismarck	
	Diocese of Crookston	
	Diocese of Duluth	
	Diocese of Fargo	
	Diocese of New Ulm	
	Diocese of Rapid City	
	Diocese of Saint Cloud	
	Diocese of Sioux Falls	
	Diocese of Winona–Rochester	
Ecclesiastical Province of San Antonio
	Archdiocese of San Antonio	
	Diocese of Amarillo	
	Diocese of Dallas	
	Diocese of El Paso	
	Diocese of Fort Worth	
	Diocese of Laredo	
	Diocese of Lubbock	
	Diocese of San Angelo	
Ecclesiastical Province of San Francisco
	Archdiocese of San Francisco	
	Diocese of Honolulu	
	Diocese of Oakland	
	Diocese of Sacramento	
	Diocese of San Jose	
	Diocese of Santa Rosa	
	Diocese of Stockton	
Ecclesiastical Province of Santa Fe
	Archdiocese of Santa Fe	
	Diocese of Gallup	
	Diocese of Las Cruces	
	Diocese of Phoenix	
	Diocese of Tucson	
Ecclesiastical Province of Seattle
	Archdiocese of Seattle	
	Diocese of Spokane	
	Diocese of Yakima	
Ecclesiastical Province of Washington
	Archdiocese of Washington	
	Diocese of Saint Thomas (This diocese covers the U.S. territory of the United States Virgin Islands.)	

=== Puerto Rican Episcopal Conference ===
Map	Diocese	Coat of Arms
Ecclesiastical Province of San Juan (This province covers the U.S. territory of Puerto Rico.)
	Archdiocese of San Juan	
	Diocese of Arecibo	
	Diocese of Caguas	
	Diocese of Fajardo–Humacao	
	Diocese of Mayagüez	
	Diocese of Ponce	

=== Episcopal Conference of the Pacific ===
Map	Diocese	Coat of Arms
Ecclesiastical Province of Agaña
	Archdiocese of Agaña (This diocese covers the U.S. territory of Guam.)	
	Diocese of Chalan Kanoa (This diocese covers the U.S. territory of the Northern Mariana Islands.)	
Ecclesiastical Province of Samoa–Apia
	Diocese of Samoa–Pago Pago (This diocese covers the U.S. territory of American Samoa.)	

== Military archdiocese ==
Members of the Armed Forces of the United States and their dependents, employees of the US Veterans Health Administration and its patients, and Americans in civil service overseas, including the Nation's diplomatic corps and their dependents, both Catholics of the Latin Church and Eastern Churches, are served by the Archdiocese for the Military Services, USA. An archbishop leads it who is presently assisted by four auxiliary bishops. Its status as an "archdiocese" is merely honorary. In 1986, Pope John Paul II amended the juridical organization of military chaplaincies from "military vicariates" to "military ordinariates", the head of which was likened to a diocesan bishop. The Ordinary of the Archdiocese of the Military Services is usually granted the personal title of "Archbishop", although this is not a requisite of the office.

== Eastern Catholic eparchies ==
The Ukrainian Greek Catholic Church in the United States is organized into a metropolia (province) comprising a metropolitan archeparchy and three suffragan eparchies.

Map	Diocese	Coat of Arms
Province of Philadelphia (Ukrainian)
	Archeparchy of Philadelphia	
	Eparchy of Chicago	
	Eparchy of Parma	
	Eparchy of Stamford	

The Ruthenian Greek Catholic Church in the United States is organized into the sui iuris Province of Pittsburgh, consisting of a metropolitan archeparchy and three suffragan eparchies. The eparchies also serve the faithful of other Byzantine Catholic Churches without established hierarchies in the United States, namely those of the Albanian, Belarusian, Bulgarian, Croatian, Greek, Hungarian, Italo-Albanian, Macedonian, Russian, and Slovak Byzantine Catholic Churches. Since 2022, this province includes also the Slovak Catholic Exarchate of Saints Cyril and Methodius of Toronto in Canada, which was formerly part of the Slovak Greek Catholic Church.

Map	Diocese	Coat of Arms
Province of Pittsburgh (Ruthenian)
	Archeparchy of Pittsburgh	
	Eparchy of Parma	
	Eparchy of Passaic	
	Eparchy of Phoenix	
	Exarchate of Toronto (Canada)	

=== Eastern Catholic eparchies in the United States immediately subject to the Holy See ===
The following particular Eastern Catholic Churches are not suffragan to metropolitan sees, but are instead exempt and therefore immediately subject to the Holy See, while they still remain part of their respective patriarchal, major archiepiscopal, or other rite- and tradition-specific particular churches.

Church	Eparchy	Coat of Arms
Chaldean Catholic Church	Eparchy of St. Thomas the Apostle of Detroit	
Chaldean Catholic Church	Eparchy of St. Peter the Apostle of San Diego	
Maronite Church	Eparchy of St. Maron of Brooklyn	
Maronite Church	Eparchy of Our Lady of Lebanon of Los Angeles	
Melkite Greek Catholic Church	Eparchy of Newton	
Syriac Catholic Church	Eparchy of Our Lady of Deliverance in the United States	
Syro-Malabar Catholic Church	Eparchy of St. Thomas of Chicago	

=== Eastern Catholic eparchies comprising the United States and Canada, and immediately subject to the Holy See ===
Several Eastern Catholic Churches have jurisdictions that include members and congregations in both the United States and Canada.

Church	Eparchy	Coat of Arms
Armenian Catholic Church	Eparchy of Our Lady of Nareg of the US and Canada	
Romanian Catholic Church	Eparchy of St George's in Canton	
Syro-Malankara Catholic Church	Eparchy of St. Mary, Queen of Peace of the US and Canada	

== Personal ordinariate (Anglican Use) ==
Under the provisions of Anglicanorum Coetibus of 2009, an effort was underway to establish a personal ordinariate, or diocese, in the United States. The ordinariate was formed for former Anglicans, including members from the Episcopal Church, Continuing Anglican churches, and already Catholic Anglican Use parishes. The first such ordinariate established was the Personal Ordinariate of Our Lady of Walsingham in the United Kingdom. The personal ordinariate encompassing the whole United States, the Personal Ordinariate of the Chair of Saint Peter, was instituted on January 1, 2012, in accordance with Anglicanorum Coetibus. It was later expanded to include Canada, and so its ordinary is admitted to the two countries' bishops' conferences.

Ecclesiastical Province Map	Diocese	Diocese Coat of Arms
	Personal Ordinariate of the Chair of Saint Peter	

== Former US dioceses ==
Diocese	Cathedral	History	Ref.
Diocese of Allegheny	St. Peter Church	January 11, 1876: Established as the Diocese of Allegheny with territory from the Diocese of Pittsburgh; July 1, 1889: Suppressed, with its territory returned to the Diocese of Pittsburgh; 1971: Title of Bishop of Allegheny Restored as Titular Episcopal See	
Diocese of Alton	Church of Sts. Peter and Paul	July 29, 1853: Established as the Diocese of Quincy, with territory from the Diocese of Chicago; January 9, 1857: See Transferred and Title Changed to Diocese of Alton; January 7, 1887: Lost territory to establish the Diocese of Belleville<; October 26, 1923: See Transferred and Title Changed to the Diocese of Springfield in Illinois; 1995: Title of Bishop of Alton Restored as Titular Episcopal See	
Diocese of Bardstown	Basilica of St. Joseph Proto-Cathedral	April 8, 1808: Established as the Diocese of Bardstown with territory from the Diocese of Baltimore; June 19, 1821: Lost territory to establish the Diocese of Cincinnati; May 6, 1834: Lost territory to establish the Diocese of Vincennes; July 28, 1837: Lost territory to establish the Diocese of Nashville; February 13, 1841: See Transferred and Title Changed to Diocese of Louisville; 1937: Elevated to Archdiocese; 1995: Title of Bishop of Bardstown Restored as Titular Episcopal See	
Diocese of Both Californias		April 27, 1840: Established as the Diocese of Both Californias with territory from the Diocese of Sonora; November 20, 1849: Title Changed to Diocese of Monterey; 1859: Title Changed to Diocese of Monterey-Los Angeles; 1892: Title Changed to Diocese of Los Angeles-San Diego; 1922: Lost territory to establish the Diocese of Monterrey-Fresno; 1936: Elevated to Archdiocese; lost territory to establish the Diocese of San Diego; 1976: Lost territory to establish the Diocese of Orange; 1978: Lost territory to establish the Diocese of San Bernardino; 1996: Title of Bishop of Both Californias Restored as Titular Episcopal See	
Diocese of Concordia	Our Lady of Perpetual Help Church	August 2, 1887: Established as the Diocese of Concordia with territory from the Diocese of Leavenworth; December 23, 1944: See transferred and title changed to Diocese of Salina; 1995: Title of Bishop of Concordia Restored as Titular Episcopal See	
Diocese of Grass Valley	St. Patrick Church	September 27, 1860: Established as the Apostolic Vicariate of Marysville with territory from the Metropolitan Archdiocese of San Francisco; March 22, 1868: Promoted as Diocese of Grass Valley; May 28, 1886: Title Changed to Diocese of Sacramento; 1995: Restored as Titular Episcopal See of Grass Valley	
Diocese of Jamestown	St. James Church	November 10, 1889: Established as the Diocese of Jamestown with territory from the Apostolic Vicariate of Dakota; April 6, 1897: See Transferred and Title Changed to Diocese of Fargo; 1995: Title of Bishop of Jamestown Restored as Titular Episcopal	
Diocese of Juneau	Cathedral of the Nativity of the Blessed Virgin Mary	June 23, 1951: Established as Diocese of Juneau from Apostolic Vicariate of Alaska; January 22, 1966: Lost territory to establish Metropolitan Archdiocese of Anchorage; May 19, 2020: Suppressed to Metropolitan Archdiocese of Anchorage–Juneau	
Diocese of Kearney	St. James Church	March 8, 1912: Established as the Diocese of Kearney with territory from the Diocese of Omaha; April 11, 1917: See transferred and title changed to Diocese of Grand Island; 1995: Title of Bishop of Kearney Restored as Titular Episcopal See	
Diocese of Lead	St. Patrick Church	August 4, 1902: Established as the Diocese of Lead with territory from the Diocese of Sioux Falls; August 1, 1930: See transferred and title changed to Diocese of Rapid City; 1995: Title of Bishop of Lead Restored as Titular Episcopal See	
Diocese of Leavenworth	Church of the Immaculate Conception	July 19, 1850: Established as the Apostolic Vicariate of Indian Territory East of the Rocky Mountains with territory from the Archdiocese of St Louis; January 6, 1857: Lost territory to establish the Apostolic Vicariate of Nebraska; 1857: Title changed to Apostolic Vicariate of Kansas; May 22, 1877: Promoted as Diocese of Leavenworth; August 2, 1887: Lost territory to establish the Diocese of Wichita and Diocese of Concordia; May 29, 1891: Title Changed to Diocese of Kansas City, Kansas; March 5, 1897: Title Changed to Diocese of Leavenworth; May 10, 1947: See Transferred and Title Changed to Diocese of Kansas City in Kansas; 1952: Elevated to Archdiocese; 1995: Title of Bishop of Leavenworth Restored as Titular Episcopal See	
Diocese of Natchez	St. Mary Basilica	July 18, 1826: Established as the Apostolic Vicariate of Mississippi with territory from the Diocese of Louisiana; July 28, 1837: Promoted as Diocese of Natchez; December 18, 1956: Title Changed to Diocese of Natchez–Jackson; March 1, 1977: See Transferred and Title Changed to Diocese of Natchez; lost territory to establish the Diocese of Biloxi and Diocese of Jackson; March 1, 1977: Title of Bishop of Natchez Designated as Titular Episcopal See	
Diocese of Natchitoches	Basilica of the Immaculate Conception	July 29, 1853: Established as the Diocese of Natchitoches with territory from the Metropolitan Archdiocese of New Orleans; August 6, 1910: See Transferred and Title Changed to Diocese of Alexandria; 1977: Title Changed to Diocese of Alexandria-Shreveport; 1986: Title Changed to Diocese of Alexandria; lost territory to establish the Diocese of Shreveport; 1995: Title of Bishop of Natchitoches Restored as Titular Episcopal See	
Diocese of Nesqually	Proto-Cathedral of St. James the Greater	May 31, 1850: Established as the Diocese of Nesqually with territory from the Diocese of Walla Walla; July 29, 1853: Gained territory from the suppressed Diocese of Walla Walla; September 11, 1907: See Transferred and Title Changed to Diocese of Seattle; 1951: Elevated as Archdiocese of Seattle; 1995: Title of Bishop of Nesqually Restored as Titular Episcopal See	
Diocese of Oregon City	St. John the Apostle Church	December 1, 1843: Established as the Apostolic Vicariate of Oregon with territory from the Metropolitan Archdiocese of Baltimore and Archdiocese of Quebec; July 24, 1846: Promoted as Diocese of Oregon City; lost territory to establish the Diocese of Vancouver Island and Diocese of Walla Walla; July 29, 1850: Elevated to Metropolitan Archdiocese of Oregon City; March 3, 1868: Lost territory to establish the Apostolic Vicariate of Idaho and Montana; 1894: Gained territory from the Diocese of Vancouver Island; June 19, 1903: Lost territory to establish the Diocese of Baker City; September 26, 1928: See Transferred and Title Changed to Archdiocese of Portland in Oregon; 1996: Title of Archbishop of Oregon City Restored as Titular Metropolitan See	
Diocese of Quincy		July 29, 1853: Established as the Diocese of Quincy with territory from the Diocese of Chicago; January 9, 1857: See Transferred and Title Changed to Diocese of Alton; January 7, 1887: Lost territory to establish the Diocese of Belleville; October 26, 1923: See Transferred and Title Changed to Diocese of Springfield in Illinois; 1995: Title of Bishop of Alton Restored as Titular Episcopal See	
Diocese of Saint Joseph		March 3, 1868: Established as Diocese of Saint Joseph with territory from the Archdiocese of Saint Louis; July 2, 1956: Suppressed, merged with the Diocese of Kansas City, Missouri, to form the Diocese of Kansas City–Saint Joseph, and lost territory to establish Diocese of Jefferson City and Diocese of Springfield–Cape Girardeau	
Diocese of Sault Sainte Marie	Holy Name of Mary Pro-Cathedral	July 29, 1853: Established as the Apostolic Vicariate of Upper Michigan with territory from the Diocese of Detroit; January 9, 1857: Elevated as Diocese of Sault Sainte Marie; October 23, 1865: Title Changed to Diocese of Sault Sainte Marie–Marquette; January 3, 1937: See Transferred and Title Changed to Diocese of Marquette; 1995: Title of Bishop of Sault Sainte Marie Restored as Titular Episcopal See; 1996: Title of Titular See Changed to Bishop of Sault Sainte Marie in Michigan	
Diocese of Vincennes	Basilica of St. Francis Xavier	May 6, 1834: Established as the Diocese of Vincennes with territory from the Diocese of Bardstown; January 8, 1857: Lost territory to establish the Diocese of Fort Wayne; March 28, 1898: See Transferred and Title Changed to Diocese of Indianapolis; 1944: Elevated to Metropolitan Archdiocese of Indianapolis; lost territory to establish the Diocese of Evansville; 1995: Title of Bishop of Vincennes Restored as Titular Episcopal See	
Diocese of Walla Walla		July 24, 1846: Established as the Diocese of Walla Walla with territory from the Apostolic Vicariate of Oregon; May 31, 1850: Lost territory to establish the Diocese of Nesqually; July 29, 1853: Suppressed, with territory annexed to the Diocese of Nesqually; 1971: Title of Bishop of Walla Walla Restored as Titular Episcopal See	

== See also ==
- Provincial boundaries in the United States
- List of Roman Catholic bishops of the United States
- List of the Roman Catholic cathedrals of the United States
- List of basilicas § Basilicas in North and Central America and the Caribbean
- Nunciature to the United States
- List of Roman Catholic dioceses in North America § Episcopal Conference of the United States of America
- List of Catholic dioceses (structured view) (including episcopal conferences and USCCB regions)
- List of Roman Catholic dioceses (alphabetical)
- List of Catholic archdioceses (by continent and nation)
- List of Catholic apostolic administrations
- List of Catholic military dioceses
- List of Catholic titular sees
