= Michael William Warfel =

American prelate

His Excellency, The Most Reverend Michael William Warfel
- Bishop Emeritus of Great Falls–Billings
- See: Diocese of Great Falls–Billings
- Appointed: November 20, 2007
- Installed: January 16, 2008
- Retired: August 22, 2023
- Predecessor: Anthony Michael Milone
- Successor: Jeffrey M. Fleming
- Previous post: Bishop of Juneau (1996–2008)

Orders
- Ordination: April 26, 1980 by Francis Thomas Hurley
- Consecration: December 17, 1996 by Francis Thomas Hurley, Michael Joseph Kaniecki, and William S. Skylstad

Personal details
- Born: September 16, 1948 (age 77) Elkhart, Indiana, USA
- Education: Indiana University Bloomington; Indiana University South Bend; St. Gregory's College Seminary; Mount St. Mary's Seminary of the West; St. Michael's College
- Motto: Always to walk in Christ

Styles of Michael William Warfel
- Reference style: His Excellency; The Most Reverend
- Spoken style: Your Excellency
- Religious style: Bishop

Michael William Warfel (born September 16, 1948) is an American prelate of the Roman Catholic Church who was bishop of the Diocese of Great Falls-Billings in Montana from 2007 to 2023. He previously served as bishop of the Diocese of Juneau in Alaska from 1996 to 2007.

== Biography ==
=== Early life ===
Michael Warfel was born on September 16, 1948, in Elkhart, Indiana. He attended Indiana University Bloomington and Indiana University South Bend, but before his graduation enlisted in the U.S. Army. Warfel served in South Vietnam for 18 months during the Vietnam War, then spent 13 months in South Korea. He left the army in 1971.

After leaving the Army in 1971, Warfel entered St. Gregory Seminary in Cincinnati, Ohio, obtaining a Bachelor of Philosophy degree. Warfel received a Master of Divinity degree from Mount St. Mary's Seminary of the West in Cincinnati. He attended St. Michael's College in Colchester, Vermont, for his Master of Theology degree. While a seminarian, Warfel visited his sister in Alaska. He later requested permission to transfer from the Diocese of Fort Wayne-South Bend, which was sponsoring his vocation, to the Archdiocese of Anchorage.

=== Priesthood ===
Warfel was ordained to the priesthood by Francis Hurley for the Archdiocese of Anchorage on April 26, 1980, at St. Matthew Cathedral in South Bend, Indiana. After his ordination, the archdiocese assigned Warfel as parochial vicar at St. Benedict Parish in Anchorage, Alaska, from 1980 to 1985, then as pastor of Sacred Heart Parish in Wasilla, Alaska, from 1985 to 1989.

The archdiocese then assigned Warfel as pastor of St. Mary Parish in Kodiak, Alaska from 1990 to 1995. While in Kodiak, Warfel instituted a Spanish-language Sunday mass . He was named pastor of Our Lady of Guadalupe Parish in Anchorage in 1995.

=== Bishop of Juneau ===
On November 19, 1996, Warfel was appointed as the fourth bishop of Juneau by Pope John Paul II.He received his episcopal consecration on December 17, 1996, from Archbishop Francis Hurley, with Bishops Michael Kaniecki and William Skylstad serving as co-consecrators, at Centennial Hall in Juneau, Alaska.

In 1997, Warfel mediated a dispute over subsistence fishing rights between the Alaska Native Brotherhood, a Native Alaskan advocacy group, and the Territorial Sportsmen, an association that sponsored fishing tournaments. As bishop, Warfel served as chair of the Committee on Evangelization within the United States Conference of Catholic Bishops (USCCB) from 1999 to 2002.

The Vatican appointed Warfel as apostolic administrator of the Diocese of Fairbanks on October 23, 2001. His term ended with the appointment of Bishop Donald Kettler on June 7, 2002.

=== Bishop of Great Falls-Billings ===
Pope Benedict XVI named Warfel as seventh bishop of Great Falls-Billings on November 20, 2007. He was installed by Archbishop John Vlazny on January 16, 2008. Within the US Conference of Catholic Bishops (USCCB), Warfel served as chair of the Subcommittee on Catholic Home Missions and as a member of the Administrative Committee.

In July 2018, Warfel reprimanded two priests from the diocese who, in clerical garb, attended a rally in Great Falls, Montana, for US president Donald Trump. The rally organizers seated the two men in the first row behind the podium. They were seen clapping when Trump joked about the MeToo movement and referred derisively to U.S. Senator Elizabeth Warren as "Pocahontas". Warfel later told the priests that they should have worn civilian clothes to the rally and should have requested less visible seats.

=== Retirement ===
Pope Francis accepted Warfel's resignation on August 22, 2023.

Catholic Church titles
Preceded by Michael Hughes Kenny	Bishop of Juneau; 1996–2007	Succeeded by Edward J. Burns
Preceded by Anthony Michael Milone	Bishop of Great Falls-Billings; 2007–2023	Succeeded by Jeffrey M. Fleming
