= Co-Cathedral of the Nativity of the Blessed Virgin Mary (Juneau, Alaska) =

Church in Alaska, United States

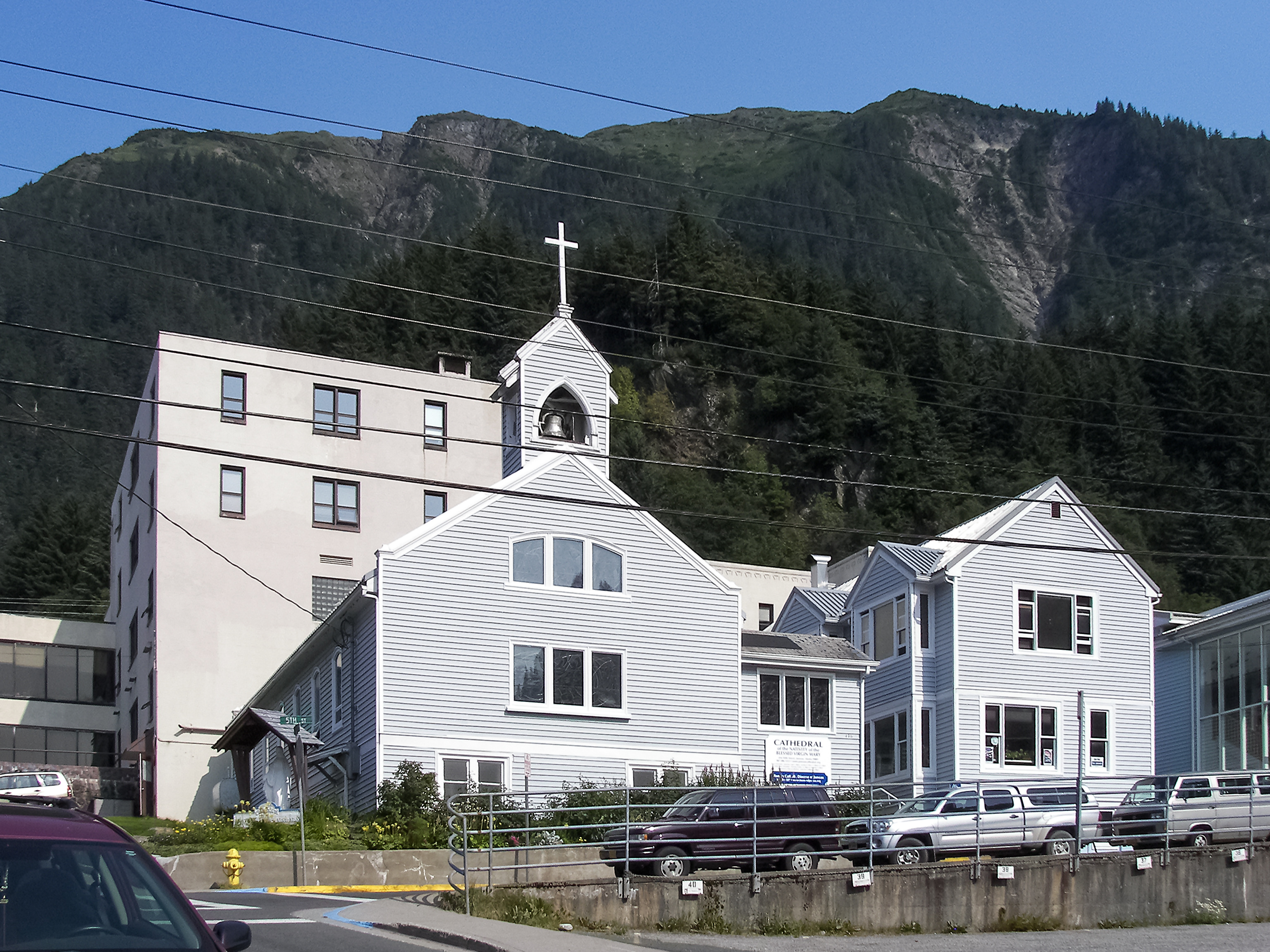
- Co-Cathedral of the Nativity of the Blessed Virgin Mary, Juneau

- Location in Alaska
- 58°18′12″N 134°24′30″W
- Location: 416 Fifth Street; Juneau, Alaska
- Country: United States
- Denomination: Roman Catholic Church
- Website: juneaucathedralbvm.org

History
- Founded: 1885
- Founder: John Althoff

Architecture
- Completed: 1910

Specifications
- Materials: Wood

Administration
- Diocese: Anchorage-Juneau

Clergy
- Bishop: Andrew E. Bellisario
- Rector: Patrick Casey

The Co-Cathedral of the Nativity of the Blessed Virgin Mary was until 2020 the mother church of the Roman Catholic Diocese of Juneau and is currently a cathedral of the Roman Catholic Archdiocese of Anchorage-Juneau. The cathedral is located at 416 Fifth Street in Juneau, Alaska. The cathedral may be the smallest in North America.

== History ==
In 1885, John Althoff was sent by Charles John Seghers and a parish was created for the growing mining community in Alaska's Silverbow Basin.

A church was built in 1886 on the same block on Fifth Street where the cathedral currently sits. This church was replaced in 1910 with the present cathedral building.

The church was consecrated and elevated to the status of cathedral in 1951, when the Diocese of Juneau was created. Robert Dermot O'Flanagan was appointed the first Bishop of Juneau, having served as a priest in Alaska since 1933.

In 1962, the cathedral parish established a mission church in the Mendenhall Valley to serve the community in the Mendenhall Valley and around the Auke Bay area. A decade later, in 1972, the mission church was separated from the cathedral parish by Francis Thomas Hurley and became St Paul the Apostle Parish.

In 2019, fundraising began for a major renovation of the cathedral with support from Andrew E. Bellisario.

On September 17, 2020, the Diocese of Juneau was merged with the Archdiocese of Anchorage. The church building is now the co-cathedral of the archdiocese, along with Our Lady of Guadalupe Cathedral in Anchorage, Alaska.

== See also ==
- List of Catholic cathedrals in the United States
- List of cathedrals in the United States
