= Paul D. Etienne =

American Catholic prelate (born 1959)

His Excellency, The Most Reverend Paul D. Etienne
- Archbishop of Seattle
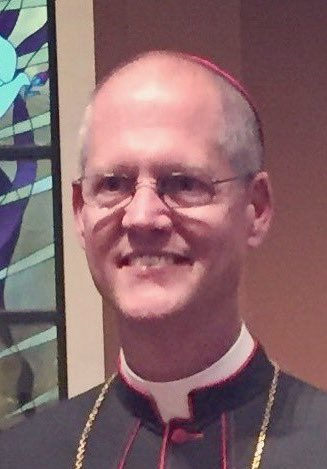
- Etienne in 2016
- Archdiocese: Seattle
- Appointed: April 29, 2019 (as Coadjutor)
- Installed: September 3, 2019
- Predecessor: J. Peter Sartain
- Previous posts: Bishop of Cheyenne (2009–2016); Archbishop of Anchorage (2016–2019)

Orders
- Ordination: June 27, 1992 by Gerald Andrew Gettelfinger
- Consecration: December 9, 2009 by Charles J. Chaput, Daniel M. Buechlein, David L. Ricken

Personal details
- Born: June 15, 1959 (age 67) Tell City, Indiana, US
- Education: Bellarmine University; University of St. Thomas (BA); Pontifical Gregorian University (JCL)
- Motto: Veritas in caritate (Latin for 'Truth in charity')
- Styles
- Reference style: His Excellency; The Most Reverend
- Spoken style: Your Excellency
- Religious style: Archbishop

Paul Dennis Étienne (born June 15, 1959) is an American Catholic prelate serving as Archbishop of Seattle since 2019. He previously served as Bishop of Cheyenne from 2009 to 2016 and Archbishop of Anchorage from 2016 to 2019.

== Early life and education ==
Etienne was born on June 15, 1959, in Tell City, Indiana, the second son of Paul and Kay Étienne. One of his uncles is a diocesan priest and an aunt is a Benedictine nun. Etienne has a sister (Nicolette) who is a Benedictine nun at Our Lady of Grace Monastery in Beech Grove, Indiana; two brothers, (Zachary and Bernard) are diocesan priests in the Diocese of Evansville.

In 1983, Etienne entered Bellarmine University in Louisville, Kentucky, but transferred in 1984 to University of St. Thomas in St. Paul, Minnesota. He obtained a Bachelor of Business Administration degree from St. Thomas in 1986. After his graduation, Etienne worked for a year for the United States Conference of Catholic Bishops (USCCB) as an assistant coordinator for papal visits.

In 1988, Etienne travelled to Rome to attend the Pontifical North American College. He obtained at Bachelor of Sacred Theology degree from the Pontifical Gregorian University in 1992.

== Ordination and ministry ==
Etienne was ordained a priest at St. Paul's Church in Tell City by Bishop Gerald Gettelfinger for the Archdiocese of Indianapolis on June 27, 1992. After his ordination, Etienne served as assistant pastor of Saint Barnabas Parish in Indianapolis and assistant vocation director for the archdiocese. He returned to Rome in 1994, obtaining his Licentiate of Spiritual Theology from Gregorian University in 1995.

Upon his return to Indiana in 1995, Etienne was appointed director of vocations for the archdiocese. Beginning in 1996, he provided sacramental ministry at Saint Anne and Saint Joseph parishes in Jennings County, while continuing as archdiocesan vocations director. In 1998, Etienne was named pastor of Our Lady of Perpetual Help Parish in New Albany, Indiana. Beginning in 2002, he became pastor at Saint John the Baptist Parish in Starlight, while remaining pastor of Our Lady of Perpetual Help Parish. In 2007, Etienne was named vice-rector of Bishop Simon Bruté College Seminary in Indianapolis, as well as pastor of Saint Simon the Apostle Parish in Indianapolis. In 2008, he became pastor of Saint John the Evangelist Parish in Indianapolis, while remaining vice-rector of the seminary. Etienne was named pastor of Saint Paul Parish in Tell City and Saint Mark Parish in Perry County in 2009.

=== Bishop of Cheyenne ===
Coat of arms as bishop of Cheyenne

On October 19, 2009, Pope Benedict XVI appointed Etienne as bishop of Cheyenne. He succeeded Bishop David L. Ricken. Etienne was consecrated at the Cheyenne Civic Center in Cheyenne, Wyoming, by Archbishop Charles J. Chaput on December 9, 2009. In 2010, Etienne requested an investigation by the Vatican into sexual abuse allegations by 11 men against Joseph Hart, a former bishop of Wyoming. Etienne suspended Hart from performing masses in 2015.

=== Archbishop of Anchorage ===
Coat of arms as archbishop of Anchorage

Pope Francis appointed Etienne as archbishop of Anchorage on October 4, 2016. He was installed at Our Lady of Guadalupe Co-Cathedral in Anchorage on November 9, 2016. He succeeded Archbishop Roger Schwietz. In 2018, Etienne announced the establishment of an independent commission to examine the personnel files of the archdiocese over the past 50 years for any new credible accusations of sexual abuse by priests against minors.

=== Coadjutor Archbishop and Archbishop of Seattle ===
Coat of arms as coadjutor archbishop of Seattle

On April 29, 2019, Pope Francis named Etienne as coadjutor archbishop of Seattle. The appointment was publicized by Archbishop Christophe Pierre, apostolic nuncio to the United States. The mass celebrating his "rite of reception" was held on June 7, 2019, at St. James Cathedral in Seattle, Washington.

On September 3, 2019, Etienne automatically became archbishop of Seattle, following the resignation of his predecessor, Archbishop J. Peter Sartain. A few days later, Etienne announced that he would not reside in Connolly House, the mansion for the archbishop of Seattle. He stated:

"I prefer to live a more simplified life," he explained, adding that he was "exploring options on church properties" and hoped to find an alternative soon. "Meanwhile, a prudent discussion will explore the possibility of selling Connolly House to help fund the great many needs across this archdiocese," he wrote.

Etienne then purchased a $2.4 million five-bedroom house overlooking Lake Washington in King County for his own use

In 2021, Etienne announced his opposition to a proposal on the eucharist by the United States Conference of Catholic Bishops, stating that it had become politicized. In 2024, he participated in the Synod of Bishops, emphasizing the importance of moving at "the pace of the Holy Spirit" in church deliberations. Following the death of Pope Francis in April 2025, Etienne released a statement mourning the loss and highlighting the Pope's role as a universal shepherd for all of God's children.

In May 2025, Etienne, together with Bishops Joseph J. Tyson and Thomas Daly, sued the State of Washington over Senate Bill 5375, a piece of legislation which would extend the mandatory reporter status of the clergy. The bill would have required priests disclose information about child sex abuse that they learned from people during confession. The prelates argued that this requirement violated their religious freedom, as it contravened canon law. It would necessitate the excommunication of priests who complied with the law, and compromise the absolute privacy entailed in the sacrament of penance. In July 2025, a federal judge granted a preliminary injunction temporarily blocking enforcement of the law, ruling that "requiring disclosure of information priests hear in the confessional infringes on their First Amendment right to practice religion."

Etienne in August 2025 visited Nagasaki, Japan, to mark the 80th anniversary of the dropping of nuclear bombs on Nagasaki and Hiroshima during World War II. The aim of the visit was to promote the 2017 Treaty on the Prohibition of Nuclear Weapons.

== Personal life ==
Etienne's immediate family is notable for its very high proportion of religious vocations.

== See also ==
- Catholic Church hierarchy
- Catholic Church in the United States
- Historical list of the Catholic bishops of the United States
- List of Catholic bishops of the United States
- Lists of patriarchs, archbishops, and bishops

Catholic Church titles
Preceded by J. Peter Sartain	Archbishop of Seattle; 2019–Present	Succeeded by Incumbent
Preceded by -	Coadjutor Archbishop of Seattle; 2019–2019	Succeeded by -
Preceded by Roger Lawrence Schwietz	Archbishop of Anchorage; 2016–2019	Succeeded by Andrew E. Bellisario
Preceded by David L. Ricken	Bishop of Cheyenne; 2009–2016	Succeeded by Steven Biegler
