= Archdiocese of Anchorage–Juneau =

Latin Catholic jurisdiction in the US

Coordinates: 61°13′11″N 149°52′44″W

Archdiocese of Anchorage–Juneau Archidiœcesis Ancoragiensis–Junellensis
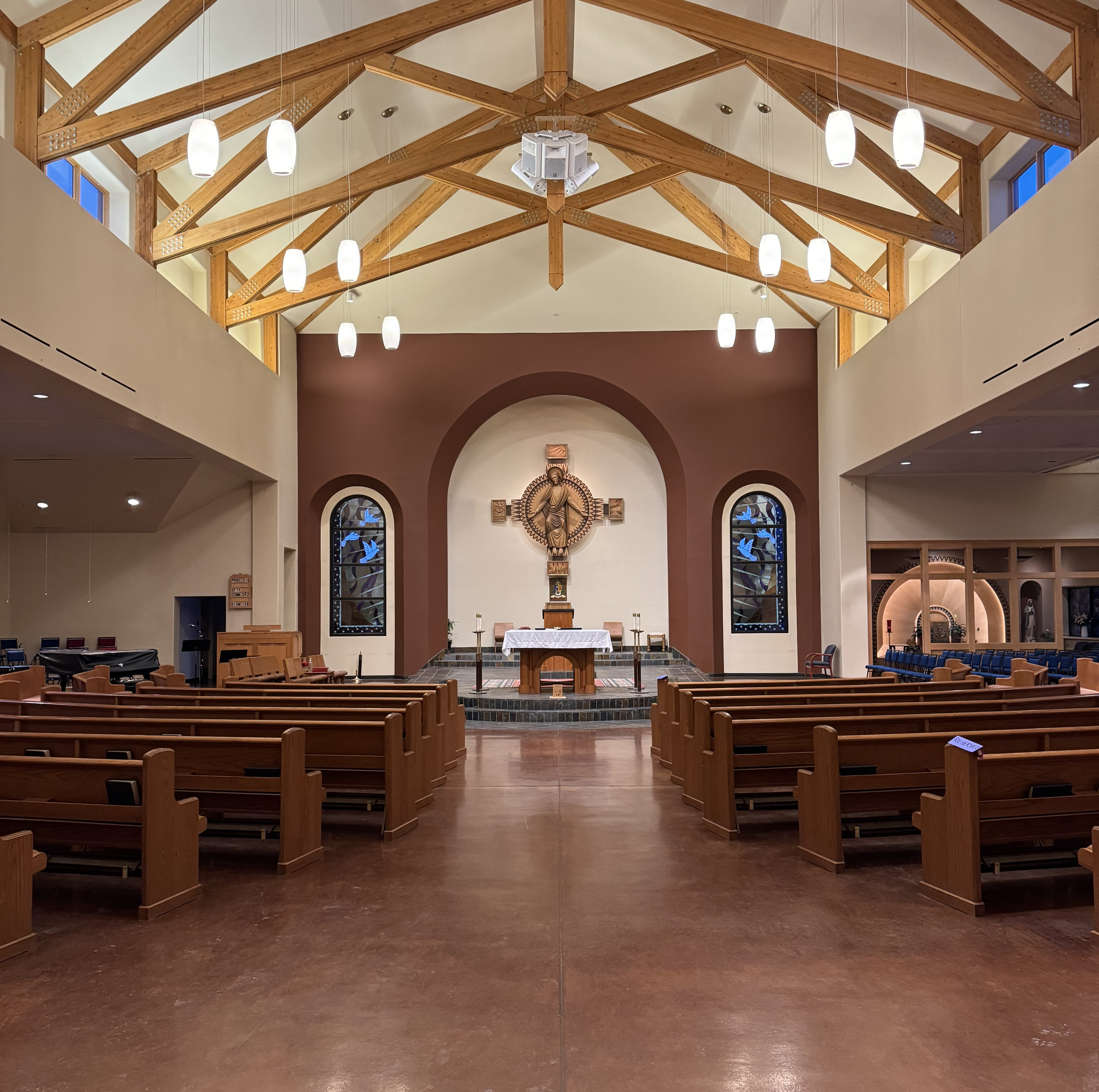
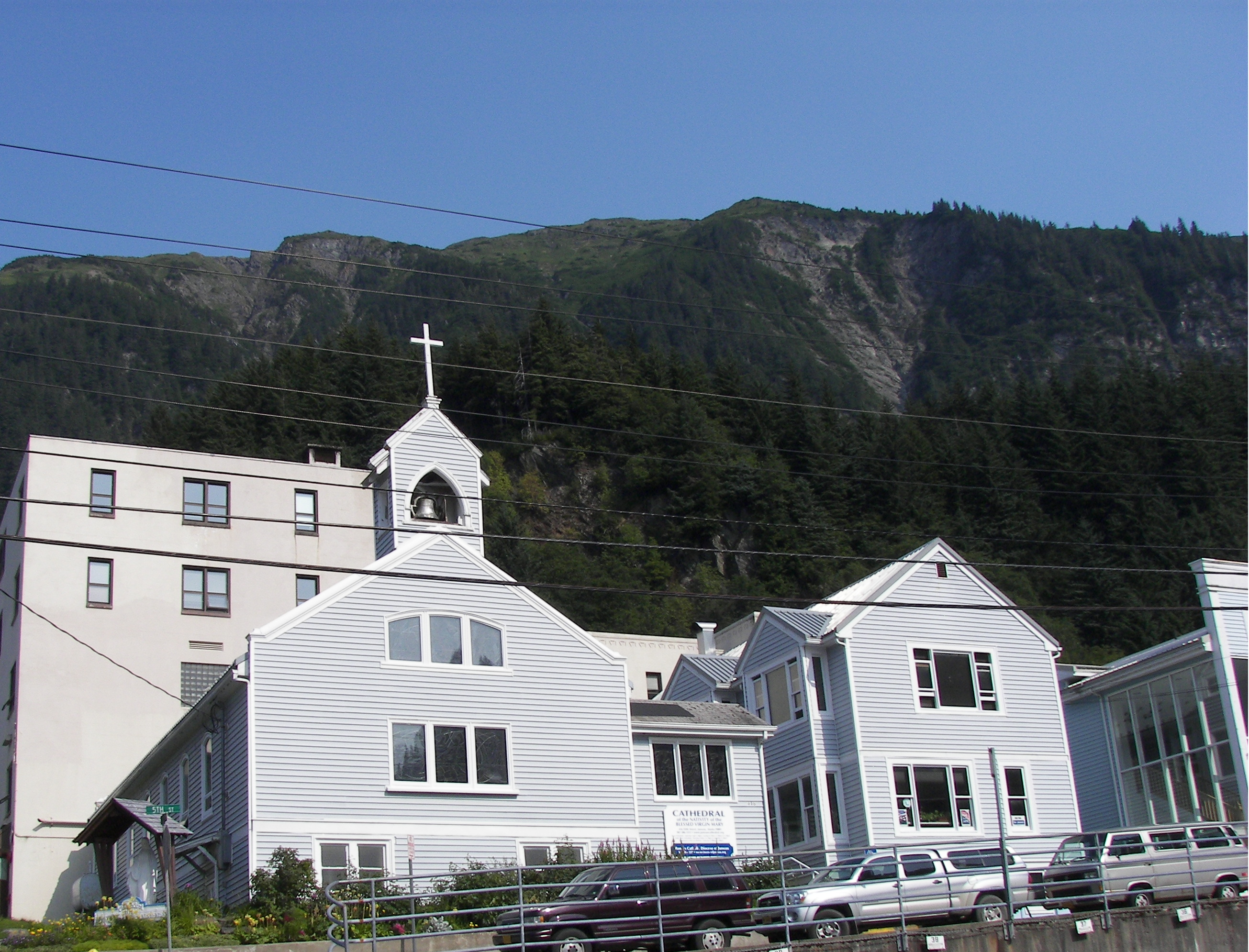
- Our Lady of Guadalupe Cathedral Co-Cathedral of the Nativity of the Blessed Virgin Mary

- Coat of Arms

Location
- Country: United States
- Territory: Southern Alaska
- Ecclesiastical province: Anchorage–Juneau

Statistics
- Area: 123,959 sq mi (321,050 km^{2})
- Population: Total; Catholics: (as of 2020); 563,372; 55,297 (9.8%)
- Parishes: 32
- Schools: 8

Information
- Denomination: Catholic
- Sui iuris church: Latin Church
- Rite: Roman Rite
- Established: September 17, 2020 (6 years ago)
- Cathedral: Our Lady of Guadalupe Cathedral
- Co-cathedral: Co-Cathedral of the Nativity of the Blessed Virgin Mary
- Patron saint: Thérèse of Lisieux

Current leadership
- Pope: Leo XIV
- Archbishop: Andrew E. Bellisario
- Vicar General: Patrick J. Travers
- Judicial Vicar: Leo Walsh
- Bishops emeritus: Roger Lawrence Schwietz (Archbishop Emeritus of Anchorage)

Map
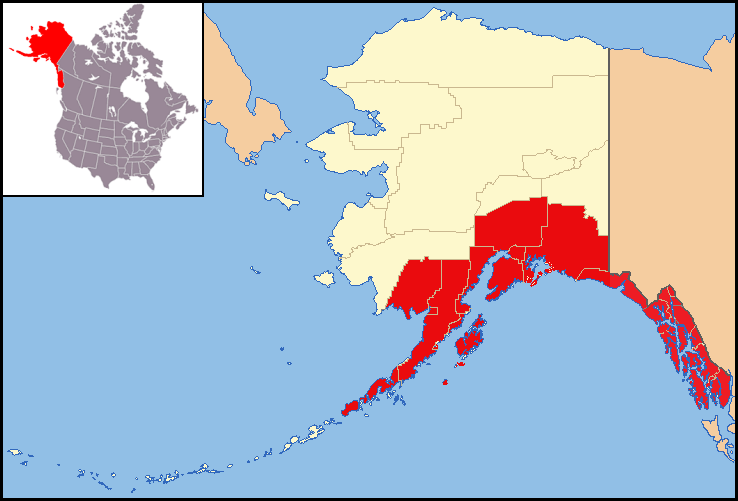

Website
- aoaj.org

The Archdiocese of Anchorage–Juneau (Latin: Archidiœcesis Ancoragiensis–Junellensis) is an archdiocese of the Roman Catholic Church in southern Alaska in the United States. The archdiocese has a single suffragan diocese, the Diocese of Fairbanks.

The mother church cathedral of the archdiocese is Our Lady of Guadalupe Cathedral in Anchorage. The co-cathedral is the Cathedral of the Nativity of the Blessed Virgin Mary in Juneau. As of 2026, the archbishop is Andrew E. Bellisario.

== History ==
=== 1867 to 1880 ===
With the purchase of Alaska from the Russian Empire in 1867, it became possible for Catholic missionaries to enter the area. The first Catholic missionaries were two members of the Oblates of Mary Immaculate, Bishop Isidore Clut and August Lecorre. They traveled in 1871 from Canada down the Yukon River to evangelize Inuit and Alaskan Athabaskan communities. At the end of their expedition, LeCorre remained at the trading post of St. Michael in at the mouth of the river.

In 1872, a mission was established in Seward. St. Vincent de Paul Church was constructed in 1878.In 1877, Bishop Charles J. Seghers and Joseph Mandart traveled to St. Michael, then went up the Yukon River to evangelize more natives.

In 1879, Seghers sent John Althoff to Wrangel to erect the first parish in Alaska. He founded Saint Rose of Lima Parish in Wrangell that same year. He ministered to Catholics in the Cassiar mining district on the Stikine River and the former Russian community of Sitka. On visits to Sitka, Althoff would celebrate mass in an old Russian carriage barn.

=== 1880 to 1900 ===
In 1880, gold was discovered in the Silver Bow Basin area of Southeastern Alaska, prompting the founding of the town of Juneau to provide for an massive influx of miners. In 1882, Althoff was transferred to Juneau to serve the miners. He celebrated the first mass and baptism in Juneau in an interdenominational "Log Cabin Church" in 1882.

The Alaska missions continued to expand as more missionaries arrived in the region. In 1894, Pope Leo XIII erected the Prefecture Apostolic of Alaska in Juneau, taking all of what was now the District of Alaska from the Canadian Dioceses of Vancouver Island and New Westminster.

In 1885, Althoff established the first Catholic church in Juneau. That same year, William Heynen opened the Church of Saint Gregory Nazianzen in Sitka.Althoff in 1886 brought in three members of the Sisters of Saint Ann to Juneau, where they opened St. Ann's Hospital, the first Catholic hospital in Alaska. It is today Bartlett Regional Hospital, The sisters also established a school in Juneau.During the Klondike Gold Rush of 1898, Saint Mark Church was built in Skagway.

=== 1900 to 1960 ===
The first Catholic church in Ketchikan was Holy Name Church, a school house that was converted in 1903. That same year, two sisters belonging to the Sisters of Providence arrived in Nome, where they started Holy Cross Hospital. The first Catholic church in the new town of Anchorage was the Church of the Holy Family, built in 1915.

In 1916, Pope Benedict XV elevated the prefecture apostolic to a vicariate apostolic. He appointed Joseph Crimont, the prefect apostolic of Alaska, as its vicar apostolic in 1917.Ketchikan General Hospital opened in Ketchikan in 1922, operated by the Sisters of Saint Joseph of Peace. It is today PeaceHealth Ketchikan Medical Center.

Pope Pius XII erected the Diocese of Juneau on June 23, 1951. The new diocese was carved out of the former Vicariate Apostolic of Alaska. The Anchorage area would remain part of the Diocese of Juneau and the remainder of the vicariate for the next 15 years. Northern Alaska was placed in the new Diocese of Fairbanks. During the second half of the 20th century, Alaska's population and business growth in the Territory of Alaska centered around Anchorage, even though Juneau remained the state's capital. In 1959, Alaska achieved statehood.

=== 1960 to 2000 ===
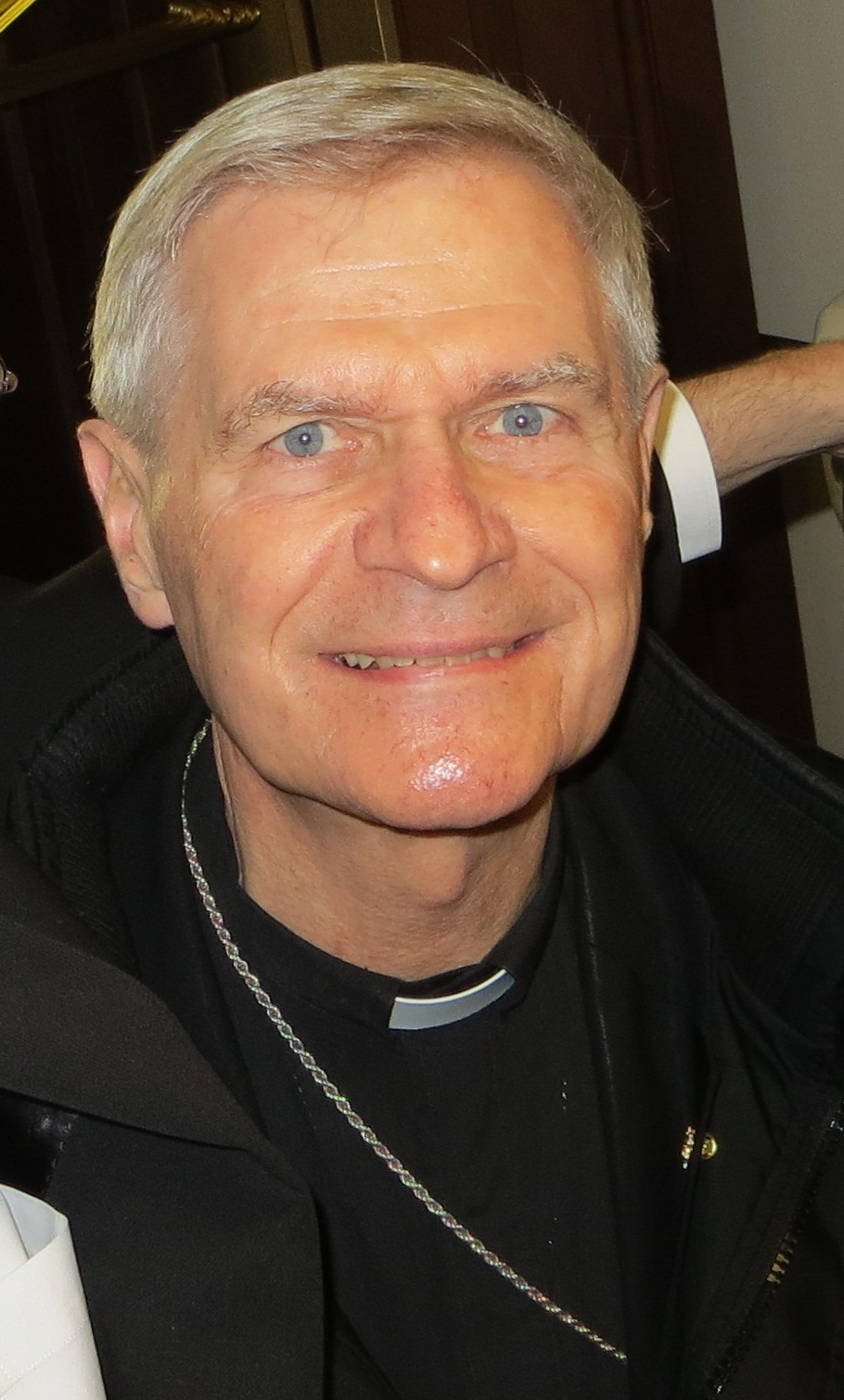
Archbishop Schweitz (2013)

In 1966, Pope Paul VI erected the Archdiocese of Anchorage and appointed Joseph T. Ryan from the Diocese of Albany as the first archbishop of Anchorage.The new archdiocese took the territory "lying west of Mount Saint Elias and Icy Bay" from the Diocese of Juneau, along with the rest of the vicariate apostolic. The pope designated the Church of the Holy Family in Anchorage as its cathedral church. The Dioceses of Fairbanks and Juneau were now the suffragan sees of the new Archdiocese of Anchorage. After Ryan was named coadjutor archbishop for the Military Vicariate in 1975, Pope Paul VI appointed Bishop Francis Hurley of Juneau as the second archbishop of Anchorage. In 1981, during a brief airport layover in Anchorage, Pope John Paul II celebrated mass on the Anchorage Park Strip before 50,000 people. Hurley resigned in 2001.

To replace Hurley, John Paul II in 1991 appointed Bishop Roger Schwietz of the Diocese of Duluth as the next archbishop of Anchorage. As the archdiocese continued to grow, the Cathedral of the Holy Family became too small to host major diocesan services.

=== 2000 to present ===
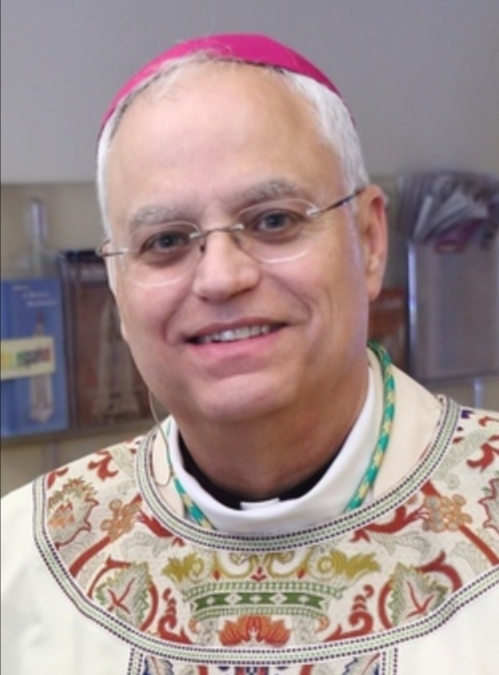
Archbishop Bellisario (2021)

Schwietz petitioned the Vatican in 2013 to designate Our Lady of Guadalupe Church as a co-cathedral, keeping Holy Family as the historic cathedral. The Vatican granted its approval in 2014. Schwietz retired in 2015.

In 2006, the archdiocese was part of a sexual abuse settlement with the Archdiocese of Boston and other defendants. Five men in Alaska and Massachusetts had accused Frank Murphy of sexual abuse. Murphy left Anchorage for Boston in 1985, where he worked as a chaplain, after local police started investigating complaints against him. Hurley told parishioners that Murphy was being treated for alcohol abuse. Murphy left the priesthood in 1995.

Pope Francis in 2016 appointed Bishop Paul D. Etienne of the Diocese of Cheyenne as the next archbishop of Anchorage. He was named coadjutor archbishop for the Archdiocese of Seattle in 2019. In October 2018, Etienne said that he would establish an independent commission to examine the personnel files of the archdiocese over the past 50 years for any new credible accusations of sexual abuse by priests against minors. In January 2020, the commission released the names of 14 clergy and diocesan employees with credible accusations of sexual abuse of minors.

On May 19, 2020, Pope Francis erected the Archdiocese of Anchorage–Juneau and suppressed the Archdiocese of Anchorage and the Diocese of Juneau. He appointed Bishop Andrew E. Bellisario, then bishop of Juneau and apostolic administrator of Anchorage, as the first archbishop of Anchorage-Juneau. The Diocese of Fairbanks became the only suffragan diocese of the new archdiocese. The COVID-19 pandemic in 2020 delayed Bellisario's installation until September 17, 2020, with the laity restricted to virtual attendance.

The pope designated the Cathedral of Our Lady of Guadalupe in Anchorage as the cathedral for the new archdiocese and the Co-Cathedral of the Nativity of the Virgin Mary in Juneau as the co-cathedral. The Cathedral of the Holy Family in Anchorage became a parish church.

== Coat of arms of Archdiocese of Anchorage-Juneau ==
Coat of arms of the former Diocese of Juneau

Coat of arms of the former Archdiocese of Anchorage

The coat of arms of the Archdiocese of Anchorage–Juneau combines many elements from the coats of arms of Juneau and Anchorage.

- A horizontal white line represents the horizon separating earth and sky
- Five blue and white wavy lines represent the water. They came from Juneau, but styled differently.
- The Big Dipper (or Great Bear, Ursa Major) Constellation represents the Alaska State Flag and the State of Alaska. It came from Juneau,
- Polaris, the North Star represents its role as a navigation aid to travelers and as Mary, mother of Jesus, “Star of the Sea.” It came from Juneau,
- The crescent moon represents the Nativity of the Blessed Virgin Mary, the titular saint of Juneau. It came from Juneau.
- The triple-pronged anchor represents hope, the Holy Trinity, and the City of Anchorage. It came from Anchorage.

== Bishops ==
=== Bishops of Juneau ===
1. Robert Dermot O'Flanagan (1951–1968)
2. Francis Thomas Hurley (1971–1976), appointed archbishop of Anchorage
3. Michael Hughes Kenny (1979–1995)
4. Michael William Warfel (1996–2008), appointed bishop of Great Falls-Billings
5. Edward James Burns (2009–2017), appointed bishop of Dallas
6. Andrew Eugene Bellisario (2017–2020), appointed archbishop of Anchorage–Juneau

=== Archbishops of Anchorage ===
1. John Joseph Thomas Ryan (1966–1975), appointed coadjutor archbishop for the Military Services and subsequently succeeded to that see.
2. Francis Thomas Hurley (1976–2001)
3. Roger Lawrence Schwietz (2001–2016; coadjutor archbishop 2000–2001)
4. Paul Dennis Etienne (2016–2019), appointed coadjutor archbishop of Seattle and subsequently succeeded to that see.

=== Archbishops of Anchorage–Juneau ===
1. Andrew E. Bellisario (2020–present)

=== Priest of Anchorage who became bishop of another diocese ===
- Michael William Warfel, appointed Bishop of Juneau in 1996

== Publications ==
Before the 2020 merger of the Archdiocese of Anchorage and the Diocese of Juneau, the archdiocese published a monthly newspaper, Catholic Anchor, with approximately 11,000 subscribers. It was established in April 1999. The diocese published its newspaper, The Inside Passage, on its web site. Both publications were replaced after the merge with a new monthly publication, the North Star Catholic.

== Suffragan see ==
The ecclesiastical province of Anchorage–Juneau encompasses the state of Alaska. The sole suffragan diocese is the Diocese of Fairbanks. Before the merger, the Diocese of Juneau and the Diocese of Fairbanks were suffragan dioceses of the Archdiocese of Anchorage.
