= Anthony Michael Milone =

American Roman Catholic prelate

His Excellency, The Most Reverend Anthony Michael Milone
- Bishop of Great Falls-Billings
- Church: Roman Catholic
- See: Diocese of Great Falls-Billings
- Appointed: December 14, 1987
- Installed: February 23, 1988
- Term ended: July 12, 2006
- Predecessor: Thomas Joseph Murphy
- Successor: Michael William Warfel
- Previous posts: Auxiliary Bishop of Omaha; Titular Bishop of Plestia

Orders
- Ordination: December 15, 1957 by Martin John O’Connor
- Consecration: January 6, 1982 by John Paul II, Eduardo Martínez Somalo, and Lucas Moreira Neves

Personal details
- Born: September 24, 1932 Omaha, Nebraska, U.S.
- Died: May 17, 2018 (aged 85) Omaha
- Education: Conception Abbey; Pontifical Gregorian University

Styles of Anthony Michael Milone
- Reference style: His Excellency; The Most Reverend
- Spoken style: Your Excellency
- Religious style: Bishop

Anthony Michael Milone (September 24, 1932 – May 17, 2018) was an American prelate of the Roman Catholic Church who served as the sixth bishop of the Diocese of Great Falls-Billings in Montana from 1988 to 2006. He previously served as an auxiliary bishop of the Archdiocese of Omaha in Nebraska from 1981 to 1988.

== Biography ==
=== Early life ===
Anthony Milone was born on September 24, 1932, in Omaha, Nebraska, where he attended Creighton Prep. He studied at the seminary at Conception Abbey in Conception, Missouri. He was then sent to Rome to reside at the Pontifical North American College while studying at the Pontifical Gregorian University.

On December 15, 1957, Milone was ordained a priest at the North American College by Archbishop Martin John O’Connor for the Archdiocese of Omaha.

=== Auxiliary Bishop of Omaha ===
On November 10, 1981, Milone was appointed titular bishop of Plestia and auxiliary bishop of Omaha by Pope John Paul II. He was consecrated by John Paul II in the Basilica of St. Peter in Rome on January 6, 1982.

=== Bishop of Great Falls-Billings ===
On December 14, 1987, Milone was appointed bishop of Great Falls-Billings by John Paul II. Millone was installed on February 23, 1988. At one point, Milone went to mass and received the eucharist from Padre Pio.

Pope Benedict XVI accepted Milone's resignation as bishop of Great Falls-Billings for reasons of health on July 12, 2006. Anthony Milone died in Omaha on May 17, 2018, at age 85.

== Episcopal succession ==
Catholic Church titles
Preceded by Thomas Joseph Murphy	Bishop of Great Falls-Billings; 1988–2006	Succeeded by Michael William Warfel
Preceded by –	Auxiliary Bishop of Omaha; 1982–1988	Succeeded by –
