= Michael Hughes Kenny =

American prelate (1937–1995)

His Excellency, The Most Reverend Michael Hughes Kenny
- Bishop of Juneau
- See: Diocese of Juneau
- In office: May 27, 1979; February 19, 1995
- Predecessor: Francis Thomas Hurley
- Successor: Michael William Warfel

Orders
- Ordination: March 30, 1963 by Leo Thomas Maher
- Consecration: May 27, 1979 by John Paul II

Personal details
- Born: June 26, 1937 Hollywood, California, USA
- Died: February 19, 1995 (aged 57) Jerash, Jordan
- Denomination: Roman Catholic

Michael Hughes Kenny (June 26, 1937 – February 19, 1995) was an American prelate of the Roman Catholic Church. He served as bishop of the Diocese of Juneau in Alaska from 1979 to 1995.

== Biography ==
Michael Kenny was born in Hollywood, California, on June 26, 1937. He was ordained into the priesthood for the Diocese of Santa Rosa by Bishop Leo Thomas Maher on March 30, 1963.

On March 22, 1979, Pope John Paul II named Kenny the third bishop of the Diocese of Juneau. He was consecrated by the pope on May 27, 1979. His co-consecrators were Archbishops Duraisamy Lourdusamy and Eduardo Somalo.

Michael Kenny died in Palestine of a brain aneurysm on February 19, 1995. He was later buried in Juneau. In 2009, the Bishop Michael H. Kenny Memorial Peace Park was opened in Juneau.

According to his successor, Bishop Edward J. Burns, Kenny traveled to every community in the diocese and met all the Catholics in these communities. In describing Kenny, Burns said:

People still talk about his deep reserves of empathy and understanding, especially for those who were struggling with the challenges and the burdens of life. He was noted for his humility, taking his responsibilities seriously but not himself. And, his sense of humor never failed him.

Catholic Church titles
Preceded by Francis Thomas Hurley	Bishop of Juneau; 1979–1995	Succeeded by Michael William Warfel
