= Joseph T. Ryan =

American prelate

The Most Reverend Joseph T. Ryan
- Archbishop for the Military Services
- See: Military Services
- Installed: March 25, 1985
- Term ended: May 14, 1991
- Predecessor: Terence Cooke
- Successor: Joseph Thomas Dimino
- Other posts: Archbishop of Anchorage (1966-1975); Coadjutor Archbishop for U.S. Military Vicariate (1975-1985)

Orders
- Ordination: June 3, 1939 by Edmund Gibbons
- Consecration: March 25, 1966 by Francis Spellman

Personal details
- Born: November 1, 1913 Albany, New York
- Died: October 9, 2000 (aged 86) Albany, New York

John Joseph Thomas Ryan (November 1, 1913 – October 9, 2000), better known as Joseph T. Ryan, was an American prelate of the Roman Catholic Church. He was archbishop of the Archdiocese for the Military Services, USA, from 1985 to 1991, having previously served as archbishop of the Archdiocese of Anchorage in Alaska from 1966 to 1975.

== Biography ==
John Ryan was born on November 1, 1913, in Albany, New York, to Patrick and Agnes (Patterson) Ryan. He attended Christian Brothers Academy in Albany, Manhattan College in New York City and St. Joseph's Seminary in Yonkers, New York.

Ryan was ordained to the priesthood by Bishop Edmund Gibbons for the Diocese of Albany on June 3, 1939. During World War II, Ryan served in the US Navy Chaplain Corps from 1943 to 1946. He participated in the 1945 Marine landing at Okinawa; he was cited twice for bravery.

After his discharge from the Navy, Ryan served in the Diocese of Albany from 1946 to 1957. He was chancellor of the U.S. Military Vicariate from 1957 to 1958. From 1958 to 1960, he was based in Beirut, Lebannon, where he did relief work with the Catholic Near East Welfare Association and the Pontifical Mission for Palestine.

=== Archbishop of Anchorage ===
On February 7, 1966, Ryan was appointed the first archbishop of the Archdiocese of Anchorage by Pope Paul VI. He received his episcopal consecration on March 25, 1966. from Cardinal Francis Spellman, with Bishops Edward Joseph Maginn and Edward Ernest Swanstrom serving as co-consecrators. The archdiocese was erected following the 1964 Good Friday earthquake, and was formed from the South Central area of the Diocese of Juneau.

=== Coadjutor Archbishop for the Military Vicariate ===
Ryan was named by Paul VI as coadjutor archbishop for the Military Vicariate and Titular Archbishop of Gabii on November 4, 1975. Ryan was appointed to assist Cardinal Terence Cooke, who was serving both as archbishop of the vicariate and archbishop of New York. Cook died on October 6, 1983.

=== Archbishop for the Military Services, USA ===
Pope John Paul II elevated the Military Vicariate to the Archdiocese of the Military Services, USA, on March 16, 1985, and named Ryan as its the first archbishop. As archbishop, Ryan provided for the pastoral and spiritual care of Catholics in the United States armed forces and their families, residents of veterans hospitals and civilian government employees living abroad.

John Paul II accepted Ryan's resignation as archbishop of the Military Services on May 14, 1991. Ryan then returned to Albany for retirement. John Ryan died on October 9, 2000, in Albany at age 86.

== See also ==
- Catholic Church hierarchy
- Catholic Church in the United States
- Historical list of the Catholic bishops of the United States
- Insignia of chaplain schools in the United States military
- List of Catholic bishops of the United States
- List of Catholic bishops of the United States: military service
- Lists of patriarchs, archbishops, and bishops
- Military chaplain
- Religious symbolism in the United States military
- United States military chaplains
- United States Navy Chaplain Corps

Catholic Church titles
Preceded by none	Archbishop of Anchorage; 1966—1975	Succeeded by Francis Thomas Hurley
Preceded by Terence Cooke	Archbishop for the Military Services; 1985—1991	Succeeded by Joseph Thomas Dimino
