= Joseph Thomas Dimino =

American Roman Catholic priest and bishop

The Most Reverend Joseph Thomas Dimino
- Archbishop for the Military Services
- See: Military Services
- Installed: May 14, 1991
- Term ended: August 12, 1997
- Predecessor: John Joseph Thomas Ryan
- Successor: Edwin Frederick O'Brien
- Other post: Auxiliary Bishop for the Military Services (1983-1991)

Orders
- Ordination: June 4, 1949
- Consecration: May 10, 1983 by Terence Cooke

Personal details
- Born: January 7, 1923 New York, New York
- Died: November 25, 2014 (aged 91)

Joseph Thomas Dimino (January 7, 1923 – November 25, 2014) was an American prelate of the Roman Catholic Church. He served as archbishop for the Archdiocese of the Military Services USA from 1991 to 1997. Dimino previously served as auxiliary bishop of the archdiocese from 1983 to 1991 and as a chaplain in the US Navy from 1953 until 1977.

== Biography ==
=== Early life ===
Dimino was born in New York City on January 7, 1923. He attended Cathedral College, in Queens, New York, and St. Joseph's Seminary in Yonkers, New York. He was ordained to the priesthood for the Archdiocese of New York on June 4, 1949. After his ordination, Dimino served several parish assignments as parochial vicar:

- St. Joseph's in Spring Valley, New York, from 1949 to 1952
- St. Teresa's in Sleepy Hollow, New York, in 1952
- St. Patrick's Old Cathedral in Lower Manhattan from 1952 to 1953

=== US Navy ===
In 1953, Dimino entered the United States Navy Chaplain Corps. At that time, American Catholic priests serving as military chaplains were in a vicariate that was under the jurisdiction of the Archdiocese of New York. His service included the post of chaplain of the Catholic church at United States Fleet Activities Yokosuka, an American naval base in Japan from 1959 to 1961. During his naval service, Dimino received the National Defense Service Medal, the Meritorious Service Medal, the China Service Medal, and the Legion of Merit.

Dimino attended the Catholic University of America in Washington, D.C., earning a Master of Religious Education degree in 1962. After retiring from the Navy in 1977, he was appointed chancellor of the vicariate for the military chaplains. While chancellor, he participated in the creation of the Archdiocese of the Military Services to replace the vicariate.

=== Archbishop of the Military Service USA ===
On March 29, 1983, Dimino was appointed auxiliary bishop for the Military Services and titular bishop of Hyccarum by Pope John Paul II. He received his episcopal consecration on May 10. 1983, at St. Patrick's Cathedral in Manhattan from Cardinal Terence Cooke, with Archbishop Joseph Thomas Ryan and Bishop Louis Edward Gelineau serving as co-consecrators. Following Archbishop Ryan's retirement on May 14, 1991, Pope Paull II appointed Dimino as the second archbishop for the Military Services.

As archbishop, he served over one million U.S. Catholics in all the armed forces, the Department of Veterans Affairs and those in government service overseas, and their dependents. In January 1993, Dimino he expressed his opposition to allowing LBGT persons to serve in the military to President Bill Clinton, saying that admitting gay men would have "disastrous consequences for all concerned."

While archbishop, Dimino added his support to a campaign started by Pope Paul II to eliminate the use of land mines. He made this statement:

Military necessity and the need to protect one's troops...are not the only or even the overriding considerations in judging the morality of the continued use of antipersonnel landmines...A renunciation of U.S. use of landmines...could contribute to efforts to achieve an international ban on these weapons.

=== Retirement ===
Pope Paul II accepted Diminos resignation as archbishop of the military services for health reasons on August 12, 1997. He went to live in a community run by the Little Sisters of the Poor order in Washington, D.C. Joseph Dimino died on November 25, 2014, in Washington.

== See also ==
- Catholic Church hierarchy
- Catholic Church in the United States
- Historical list of the Catholic bishops of the United States
- Insignia of chaplain schools in the United States military
- List of Catholic bishops of the United States
- Lists of patriarchs, archbishops, and bishops
- Military chaplain
- Religious symbolism in the United States military
- United States military chaplains
- United States Navy Chaplain Corps

Catholic Church titles
Preceded by John Joseph Thomas Ryan	Archbishop for the Military Services; 1991—1997	Succeeded by Edwin Frederick O'Brien
