= Andrew E. Bellisario =

American Catholic Archbishop

His Excellency, The Most Reverend Andrew Eugene Bellisario C.M
- Archbishop of Anchorage-Juneau
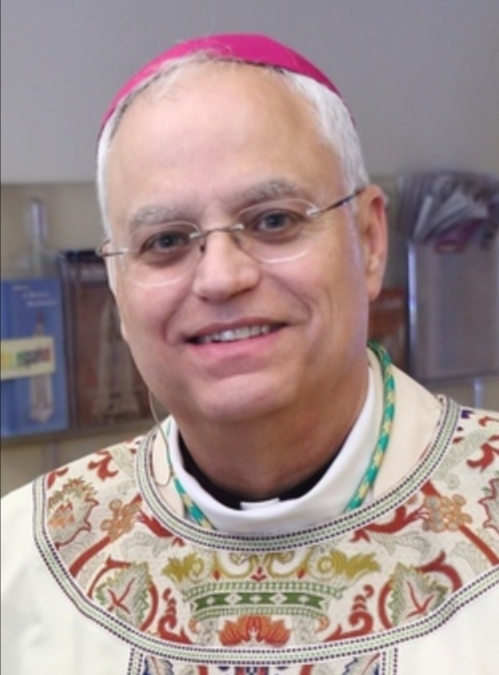
- Archdiocese: Anchorage–Juneau
- Appointed: May 18, 2020
- Installed: September 17, 2020
- Predecessor: Paul D. Etienne
- Previous posts: Bishop of Juneau (2017-2020)

Orders
- Ordination: June 16, 1984 by Juan Alfredo Arzube
- Consecration: October 10, 2017 by Paul D. Etienne, Roger Lawrence Schwietz, and Edward J. Burns

Personal details
- Born: December 19, 1956 (age 69) Alhambra, California, US
- Education: Saint Mary's of the Barrens Seminary College; De Andreis Institute of Theology
- Motto: Rich in mercy

Styles of Andrew Eugene Bellisario
- Reference style: His Excellency; The Most Reverend
- Spoken style: Your Excellency
- Religious style: Archbishop

Andrew Eugene Bellisario CM (born December 19, 1956) is an American Catholic prelate who has served as Archbishop of Anchorage-Juneau since 2020. He previously served as Bishop of Juneau from 2017 to 2019. He is a member of the Congregation of the Mission.

== Biography ==
=== Early life ===
Born in Los Angeles on December 19, 1956, Andrew Bellisario is the son of Rocky and Mildred Bellisario. In 1975, he graduated from Saint Vincent Seminary High School in Montebello, California.

In 1975, Bellisario entered the Congregation of the Mission (also known as the Vincentians). After the novitiate, he attended St. Mary's of the Barrens Seminary College in Perryville, Missouri. He earned a Bachelor of Philosophy degree there in 1976. In 1980, Bellisario received a Master of Divinity degree from De Andreis Institute of Theology in Lemont, Illinois.

=== Priesthood ===
On June 16, 1984, Bellisario was ordained at St. Vincent de Paul Church in Los Angeles by Bishop Juan Alfredo Arzube into the priesthood for the Congregation of the Mission. After ordination, he was give pastoral assignments in Our Lady of the Miraculous Medal in Montebello, Saint Vincent de Paul in Huntington Beach, and a parish in Patterson.

Bellisario later became the director of the De Paul Evangelization Center in Montebello. He also served as the provincial superior of the Vincentians' Western Province, and as the director of the Daughters of Charity's Province of Los Altos Hills.

The Vincentians assigned Bellisario to Alaska as director of the Vincentian International Missions service there. In May 2016, he was named pastor of Our Lady of Guadalupe Cathedral in what was then the Archdiocese of Anchorage.

=== Bishop of Juneau ===
On July 11, 2017, Pope Francis appointed Bellisario as Bishop of Juneau. He was consecrated by Bishop Paul Etienne on October 10, 2017, at St. Paul the Apostle Church in Juneau. On June 7, 2019, Bellisario was named apostolic administrator of Anchorage following the appointment of Etienne as Archbishop of Seattle.

=== Archbishop of Anchorage-Juneau ===
On May 19, 2020, Francis named Bellisario as archbishop of the newly formed Archdiocese of Anchorage-Juneau. Bellisario was installed on September 17, 2020.

== Coat of arms as bishop of Juneau ==
Coat of Arms as Bishop of Juneau

=== Left side of shield ===
- The Wavy Silver and Blue lines: represents the water routes uniting the parishes and missions of the diocese.
- The Constellation Ursa Major, the Great Bear: The constellation includes the Big Dipper with its two pointers to the North Star.
- The North Star (Polaris): represents Mary, mother of Jesus, under her title "Our Lady, Star of the Sea" (Stella Maris). It also represents the constant guide of the mariner, explorer, hunter, trapper, prospector, woodsman and surveyor of Alaska.
- The Crescent Moon: represents the nativity of the Virgin Mary, and commemorates the cathedral church of the diocese.

=== Right side of shield ===
- The Cross of Saint Andrew: represents Andrew the Apostle, Bellisario's patron saint.
- The Long Stem Rose: represents Bellisario's mother, Mildred (1922–2006), and his English heritage.
- The Ship: represents the Catholic Church, the bark of Saint Peter. It also represents Bellisario's father, Rocky (1915–2005), the Bellisario family and his Italian heritage.
- The Sacred Heart of Jesus: represents Jesus and commemorates Bellisario's religious community, the Congregation of the Mission.
- The Immaculate Heart of Mary: represents the Virgin Mary and commemorates the Daughters of Charity of Saint Vincent de Paul.

Catholic Church titles
Preceded by Edward J. Burns	Bishop of Juneau; 2017–2020	Succeeded by Office suppressed
Preceded by Paul Dennis Etienne	Archbishop of Anchorage-Juneau; 2020–present	Succeeded by Incumbent
