= Roger Lawrence Schwietz =

American prelate

His Excellency, The Most Reverend Roger Lawrence Schwietz OMI
- Archbishop Emeritus of Anchorage
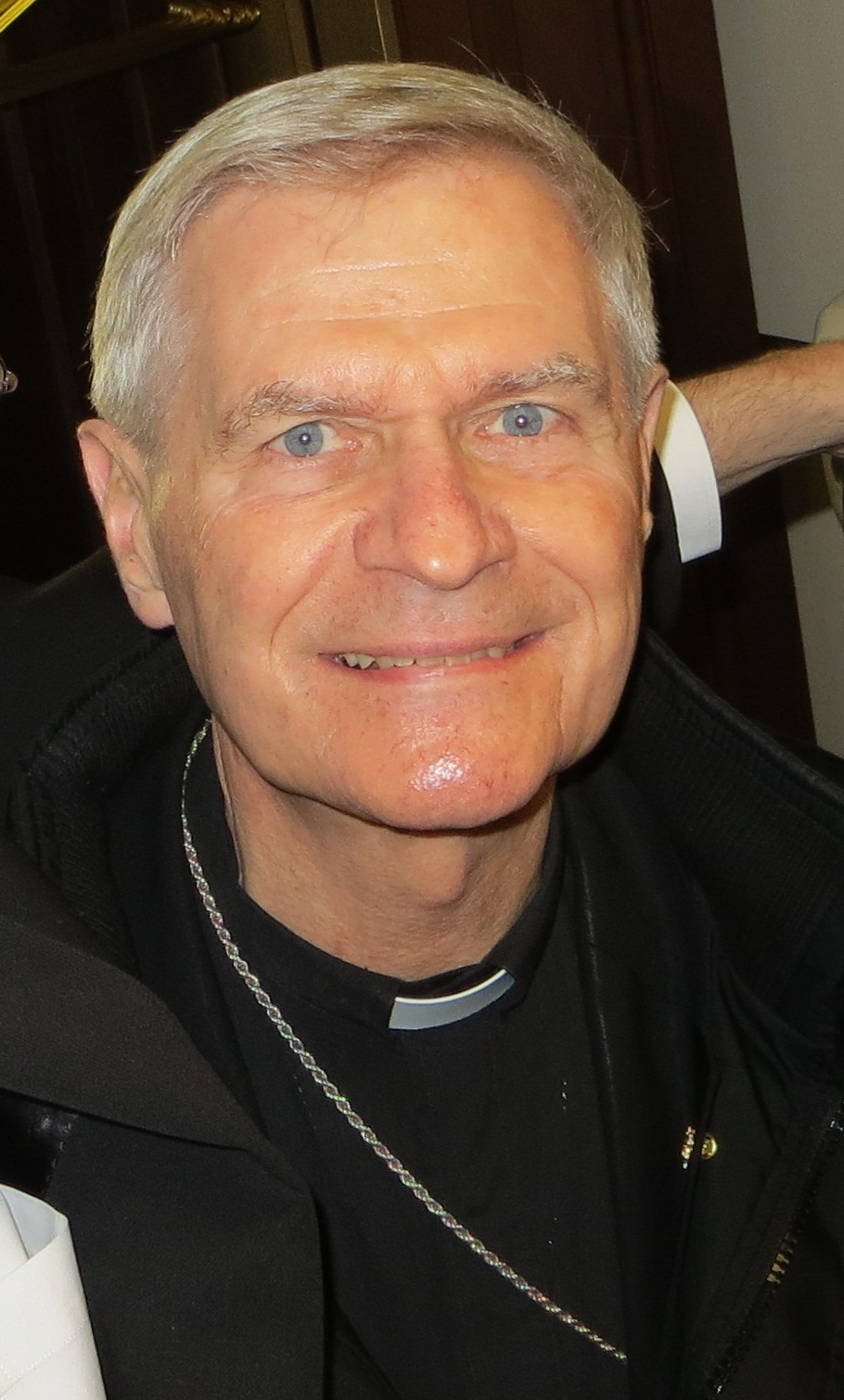
- Archbishop Schwietz at the Alaska State Capitol in March 2013
- Church: Catholic
- Archdiocese: Anchorage
- Appointed: January 18, 2000
- Installed: March 3, 2001
- Retired: October 4, 2016
- Predecessor: Francis Thomas Hurley
- Successor: Paul D. Etienne
- Previous posts: Coadjutor Bishop of Anchorage (2000-2001); Bishop of Duluth (1990-2000)

Orders
- Ordination: December 20, 1967 by Joseph Patrick Fitzgerald
- Consecration: February 2, 1990 by John Roach, Robert Brom, and Michael David Pfeifer
- Rank: Metropolitan Archbishop

Personal details
- Born: July 3, 1940 (age 86) Saint Paul, Minnesota, US
- Education: University of Ottawa; Loyola University Chicago; Pontifical Gregorian University
- Motto: Jesus Christ is Lord
- Coat of arms

Styles of Roger Lawrence Schwietz
- Reference style: His Excellency; The Most Reverend
- Spoken style: Your Excellency
- Religious style: Archbishop

Roger Lawrence Schwietz OMI (born July 3, 1940) is an American prelate of the Catholic Church. Schwietz served as archbishop of the Archdiocese of Anchorage in Alaska from 2001 to 2016. He previously served as bishop of the Diocese of Duluth in Minnesota from 1989 to 2000.

== Biography ==
=== Early life ===
Roger Schwietz was born on July 3, 1940, in Saint Paul, Minnesota, the son of a Polish-American tavern owner. He was baptized on July 21, 1940, and attended the parish of St. Casimir. He attended Cretin-Derham Hall High School in Saint Paul. On August 15, 1961, Schwietz made his first profession as a member of the Oblates of Mary Immaculate and entered their seminary.

Schwietz attended the University of Ottawa in Ottawa, Ontario, earning an undergraduate degree in philosophy and a master's degree in philosophy. He later received a master's degree in counseling psychology from Loyola University Chicago.

=== Priesthood ===
On December 20, 1967, Schwietz was ordained to the priesthood for OMI in Rome at the International College of the Missionary by Archbishop Joseph Patrick Fitzgerald. After his 1967 ordination, OMI assigned Schwietz to a pastoral assignment at a parish in Fond du Lac, Wisconsin. He then traveled to Rome to attend the Pontifical Gregorian University, receiving his Licentiate of Sacred Theology in 1968. Returning to the United States, Schwietz spent the next several years working with OMI seminarians.

In 1975, Schwietz was appointed associate pastor of St. Thomas Aquinas Parish in International Falls, Minnesota. He left St. Thomas in 1978 after the OMI named him director of its college seminary program at Creighton University in Omaha, Nebraska. In 1984, Schwietz was transferred from Omaha to serve as pastor of Holy Family Parish in Duluth, Minnesota.

=== Bishop of Duluth ===
On December 12, 1989, Pope John Paul II appointed Schwietz as the seventh bishop of Duluth. He was consecrated on February 2, 1990, by Archbishop John Roach, with Bishops Robert Brom and Michael Pfeifer serving as co-consecrators, at the Cathedral of Our Lady of the Rosary in Duluth.

While bishop, Schwietz served as episcopal moderator for the Teens Encounter Christ (TEC) movement, starting in 1991. Schwietz received an honorary Doctor of Humanities degree from Lewis University in Romeoville, Illinois, in 1998.

In a 2002 affidavit, Schwietz said that, as bishop of Duluth, he had approved a small settlement of under $100,000 ($179,001 in 2025) to a former seminarian who claimed in the mid-1990s that he had been sexually abused by Bishop Brom, Cardinal Joseph Bernardin and several priests. As part of the settlement, shared by the Diocese of Winona, the seminarian retracted all his charges.

=== Coadjutor Archbishop and Archbishop of Anchorage ===
On January 18, 2000, John Paul II named Schwietz as coadjutor archbishop of Anchorage to assist Archbishop Francis Hurley. Schwietz was installed as coadjutor on March 24, 2000. On March 3, 2001, with Hurley's resignation, Schwietz automatically became archbishop of Anchorage. A licensed pilot, Schwietz frequently flew his own plane to visit distant parishes.

On October 2, 2006, Guzmán Carriquiry Lecour, undersecretary of the Pontifical Council for the Laity in Rome, met with Schwietz, who presented TEC to the curial dicastery. Schwietz also served as episcopal liaison to Region I of the National Association of Catholic Chaplains.

Within the United States Conference of Catholic Bishops (USCCB), Schwietz served as a consultant to the Liturgy Committee (1991 to 1994), member (1992 to 2004) and chairman (elected 1998) of the Vocation Committee, and member of the committee on the Laity (1995 to 1998) and chair of its Subcommittee on Youth (1993–1998).

Schwietz also sat on the Catholic Relief Services' board of directors (1997–2003) and the NCCB administrative board (1994 to 1997, 1998 to 2002). In 2002, he became regional representative on the board for the American College in Leuven, Belgium.

On January 16, 2008, the Vatican appointed Schwietz as the apostolic administrator of the Diocese of Juneau while continuing his position as archbishop. He administered Juneau until January 19, 2009, when Monsignor Edward Burns was consecrated as its next bishop. Schwietz was named apostolic administrator a second time on September 20, 2013, this time for the Diocese of Fairbanks. When Reverend Chad Zielinski was consecrated in Fairbanks as bishop on December 15, 2014, Schwietz's duties as apostolic administrator ended.

=== Retirement and legacy ===
In July 2015, when Schwietz reached the mandatory retirement age of 75, he submitted his letter of resignation to the pope. Pope Francis accepted Schwietz's resignation as archbishop of Anchorage on October 4, 2016. He was succeeded by Bishop Paul D. Etienne from the Diocese of Cheyenne.

On April 28, 2017, Schwietz was brought to Providence Alaska Medical Center in Anchorage with complaints of chest pain, later diagnosed as a heart attack. In late November 2017, he underwent successful heart valve replacement surgery at the Mayo Clinic in Rochester, Minnesota. As of 2024, Schwietz was serving as archbishop in residence of St. Andrew's Parish in Eagle River, Alaska. In addition to his residence in Alaska, Schwietz owns a home in Fort Myers, Florida.

== Episcopal succession ==
Catholic Church titles
Preceded by Francis Thomas Hurley	Archbishop of Anchorage; 2000–2016	Succeeded by Paul Dennis Etienne
Preceded by Robert Henry Brom	Bishop of Duluth; 1989–2000	Succeeded by Dennis Marion Schnurr

== See also ==
- Catholic Church hierarchy
- Catholic Church in the United States
- Historical list of the Catholic bishops of the United States
- List of Catholic bishops of the United States
- Lists of patriarchs, archbishops, and bishops
