= Diocese of Juneau =

Former diocese of the Roman Catholic Church in Alaska, United States

Coordinates: 58°18′13″N 134°24′29″W

Diocese of Juneau Dioecesis Junellensis
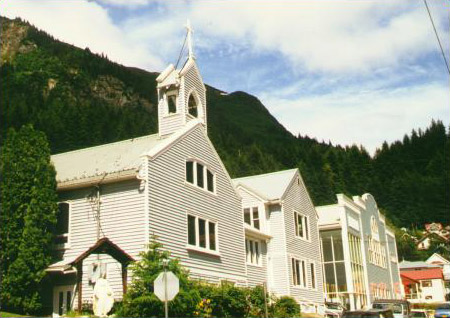
- Cathedral of the Nativity of the Blessed Virgin Mary

- Coat of arms

Location
- Country: United States
- Territory: Southeastern Alaska
- Ecclesiastical province: Anchorage

Statistics
- Area: 37,566 sq mi (97,300 km^{2})
- Population: Total; Catholics: (as of 2016); 79,557; 10,574 (13.3%)
- Parishes: 11

Information
- Denomination: Catholic
- Sui iuris church: Latin Church
- Rite: Roman Rite
- Established: June 23, 1951
- Dissolved: May 19, 2020
- Cathedral: Cathedral of the Nativity of the Blessed Virgin Mary
- Patron saint: St. Thérèse of Lisieux

Leadership
- Pope: Leo XIV
- Bishop: Robert O'Flanagan (first); Andrew Bellisario (last)

Map
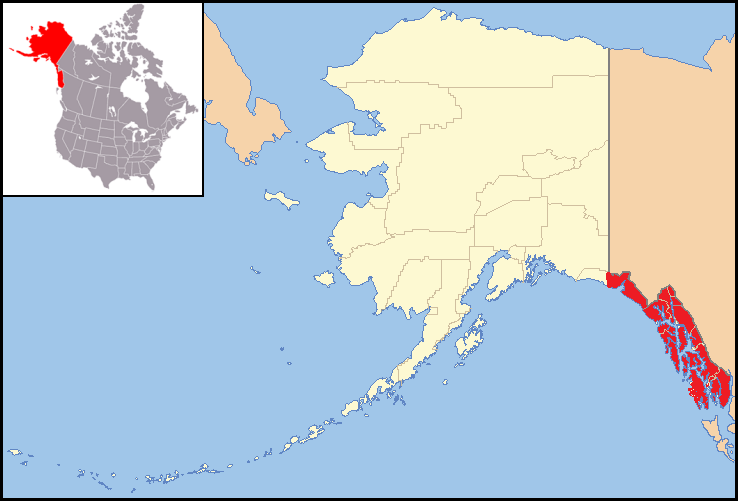

Website
- dioceseofjuneau.org

The Diocese of Juneau (Latin: Dioecesis Junellensis) was a Latin Church ecclesiastical territory or diocese of the Catholic Church in the northwestern United States, comprising the southeastern part of the state of Alaska. It was led by the bishop who served as pastor of the mother church, Cathedral of the Nativity of the Blessed Virgin Mary in Juneau. The diocese of Juneau was a suffragan diocese of the Archdiocese of Anchorage.

On May 19, 2020, the Diocese of Juneau was merged with the Archdiocese of Anchorage, which was renamed the Archdiocese of Anchorage-Juneau, and Bishop Andrew Bellisario was elevated to Archbishop.

== History ==
The See of Juneau was erected on June 23, 1951, and took its territory from the former Apostolic Vicariate of Alaska. On October 3, 1951, Dermot O'Flanagan of Holy Family Church in Anchorage was installed as the first Bishop of Juneau and he served until 1968. While in office, Bishop O'Flanagan attended the Second Vatican Council.

In 2007, the Juneau diocese became vacant when the previous bishop, Michael W. Warfel, was appointed bishop of Great Falls–Billings.

On January 19, 2009, Pope Benedict XVI named Edward J. Burns, a priest of the Diocese of Pittsburgh, as Bishop of Juneau. He was installed on April 5, 2009. In December 2016, Pope Francis named Burns Bishop of Dallas.

Pope Francis appointed Andrew E. Bellisario as bishop on July 11, 2017. He later became, concurrently, apostolic administrator of the Anchorage archdiocese. In 2020, these 2 jurisdictions were combined to form the Archdiocese of Anchorage-Juneau, and he was appointed its archbishop.

== Bishops ==
The list of bishops and their years of service:

- Robert Dermot O'Flanagan (1951–1968)
- Francis Thomas Hurley (1971–1976), appointed Archbishop of Anchorage
- Michael Hughes Kenny (1979–1995)
- Michael William Warfel (1996–2008), appointed Bishop of Great Falls-Billings
- Edward James Burns (2009–2017), appointed Bishop of Dallas
- Andrew Eugene Bellisario (2017–2020), appointed Archbishop of Anchorage-Juneau

=== Auxiliary bishop ===
Francis Thomas Hurley (1970–1971), appointed Bishop of Juneau

== Priests ==
As of 2019:

- Patrick Travers (vicar general)
- Pat Casey
- Mike Galbraith
- Steve Gallagher
- Perry Kenaston
- Edmund J. Penisten
- Andrew Sensenig

== Parishes, missions and shrines ==
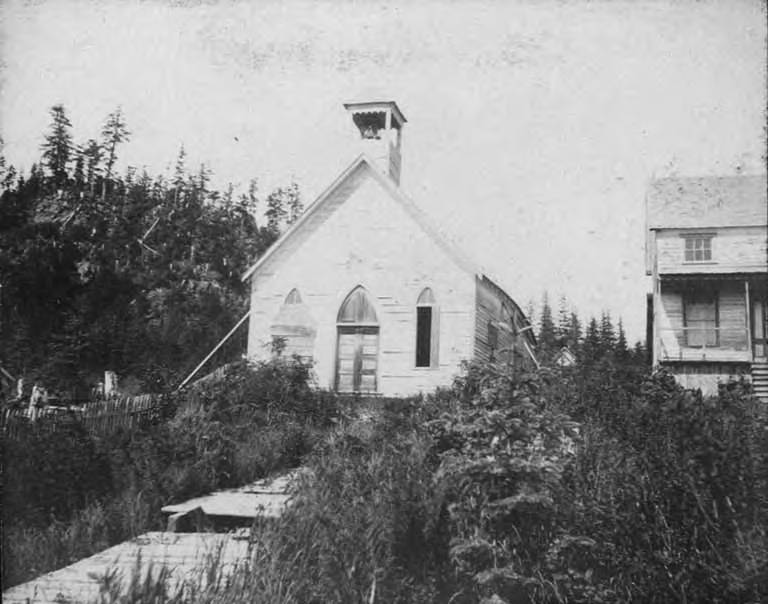
St. Rose of Lima in Wrangell, Alaska, is the oldest Catholic parish in the state of Alaska. The original church stood from 1879-98 and was rebuilt in 1908.

- Holy Family, Gustavus (Mission)
- Sacred Heart, Haines
- Sacred Heart, Hoonah
- Cathedral of the Nativity of the Blessed Virgin Mary, Juneau
- St. Paul the Apostle, Juneau
- National Shrine of St. Thérèse, Juneau
- Catholic Community, Kake (Mission)
- Holy Name, Ketchikan
- St. John by the Sea, Klawock (Prince of Wales Island)
- Holy Family, Metlakatla (Mission)
- Body of Christ, Pelican (Mission)
- St. Catherine of Siena, Petersburg
- St. Gregory of Nazianzen, Sitka
- St. Therese of the Child Jesus, Skagway
- St. Francis Chapel, Tenakee Springs (Mission)
- St. Rose of Lima, Wrangell
- St. Ann, Yakutat

== Popular culture ==
In the television series The Young Pope, directed by Paolo Sorrentino, the fictional Pope Pius XIII repeatedly assigned his enemies in the Curia to "Ketchikan, Alaska", to suffer its freezing weather and isolation. There is no such diocese, but it is a parish of the Diocese of Juneau.

== See also ==
- Catholic Church by country
- Catholic Church hierarchy
- Ecclesiastical Province of Anchorage
- Historical list of the Catholic bishops of the United States
- List of Roman Catholic archdioceses (by country and continent)
- List of Roman Catholic dioceses (alphabetical) (including archdioceses)
- List of Roman Catholic dioceses (structured view) (including archdioceses)
