= Edward J. Burns =

American Catholic prelate (born 1957)

His Excellency, The Most Reverend Edward J. Burns
- Bishop of Dallas
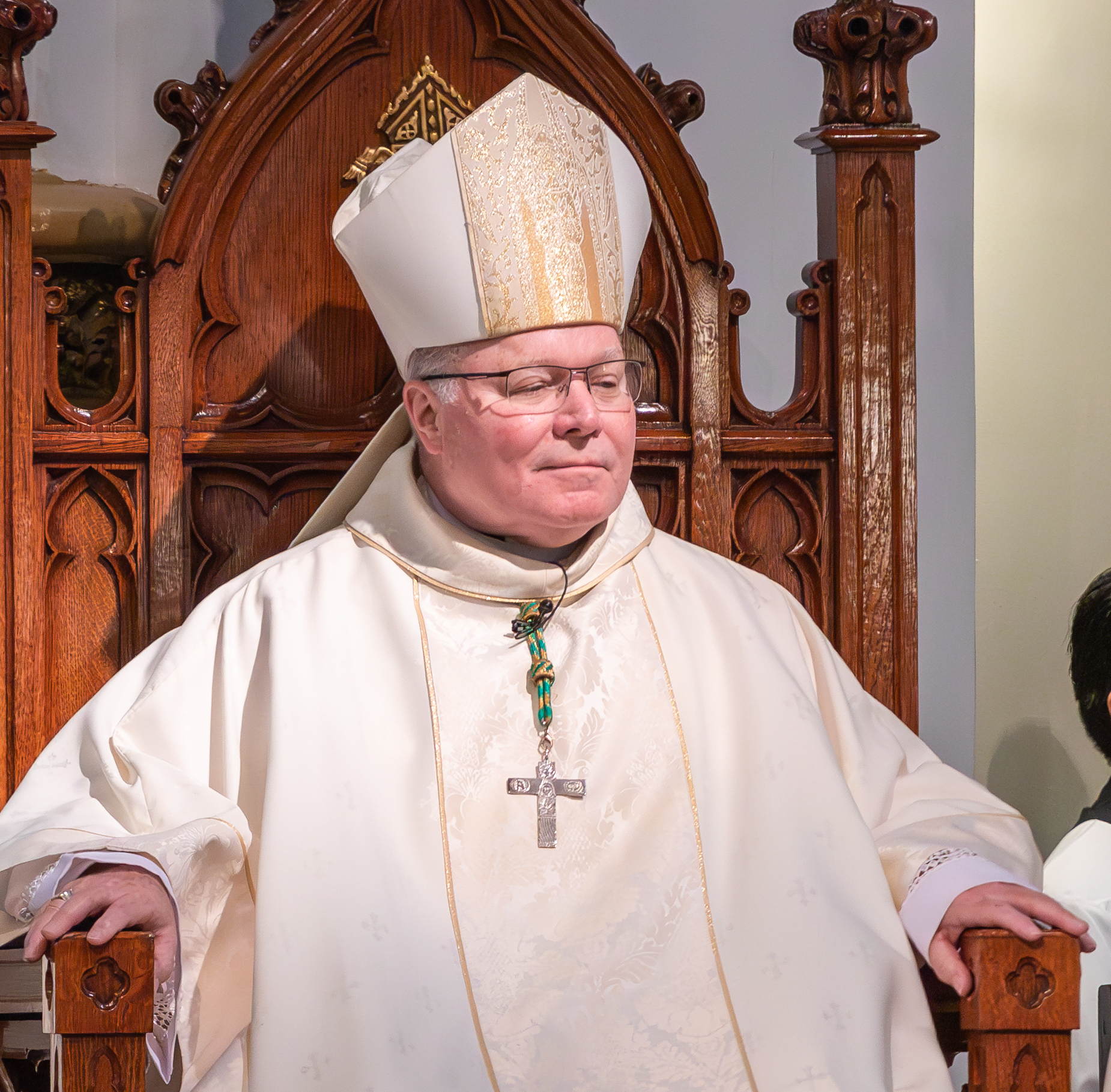
- Bishop Burns in 2024
- Church: Catholic Church; Latin Church
- Province: San Antonio
- See: Dallas
- Appointed: December 13, 2016
- Installed: February 9, 2017
- Predecessor: Kevin Farrell
- Previous post: Bishop of Juneau (2009‍–‍2017)

Orders
- Ordination: June 25, 1983 by Vincent Leonard
- Consecration: March 3, 2009 by David Zubik, Roger Schwietz, and Donald Wuerl

Personal details
- Born: October 7, 1957 (age 69) Pittsburgh, Pennsylvania, US
- Education: Duquesne University (BA); Mount Saint Mary's University (MDiv, MA)
- Motto: Pray with confidence
- Styles
- Reference style: His Excellency; The Most Reverend
- Spoken style: Your Excellency
- Religious style: Bishop

Edward James Burns (born October 7, 1957) is an American Catholic prelate serving as Bishop of Dallas since 2017. He previously served as Bishop of Juneau from 2009 to 2017.

Before becoming a bishop, Burns spent nine years working for the United States Conference of Catholic Bishops (USCCB). As bishop, he has served as chair of the Committee on the Protection of Children and Young People and as a member of its Subcommittee on Catholic Home Missions.

== Biography ==
=== Early life and education ===
Edward James Burns was born on October 7, 1957, in Pittsburgh, Pennsylvania, to Donald and Geraldine (née Little) Burns. He has a brother, Robert. Burns attended Lincoln High School in Ellwood City, graduating in 1973.

Having decided to become a priest, Burns enrolled at Saint Paul Seminary at Duquesne University, where he earned a Bachelor of Arts degree in philosophy and sociology. He continued his studies at Mount St. Mary's Seminary in Emmitsburg, Maryland, receiving Master of Divinity and Master of Theology degrees from Mount St. Mary's University.

=== Ordination and ministry ===
Burns was ordained to the priesthood in Pittsburgh at Saint Paul Cathedral for the Diocese of Pittsburgh by Bishop Vincent Leonard on June 25, 1983. After his 1983 ordination, the diocese assigned Burns as parochial vicar at Our Lady of Lourdes Parish in Burgettstown, Pennsylvania and Immaculate Conception Parish in Washington, Pennsylvania. In 1991, Burns was named as vocations director and vice-rector of St. Paul Seminary, becoming its rector in 1996.

Burns served in Washington, D.C. as executive director of the Secretariat for Clergy, Consecrated Life and Vocations at the US Conference of Catholic Bishops (USCCB) for nine years, beginning in 1999. His office produced a DVD titled Fishers of Men, a documentary on the lives of priests. Burns published a booklet, We Were There, that described the experiences of priests who served at the World Trade Center in New York City and the Pentagon in Arlington, Virginia, after the September 11, 2001, terrorist attacks.

In 2002, Burns was named as co-chair of a Vatican-ordered congress on vocations in North America. From 2005 to 2006, he provided support for a Vatican review of all Catholic seminaries in the U.S. Burns received the title of monsignor from the Vatican in 2006. In 2008, he returned to Pittsburgh to resume his jobs as rector of St. Paul Seminary and vocations director for the diocese.

=== Bishop of Juneau ===
Coat of arms as bishop of Juneau

On January 19, 2009, Pope Benedict XVI appointed Burns as the fifth bishop of Juneau. He received his episcopal consecration on March 3, 2009, at Saint Paul Cathedral in Pittsburgh from Bishop David Zubik, with Archbishop Roger Schweitz and Archbishop Donald Wuerl serving as co-consecrators; this was separate from his installation ceremony for the convenience of friends in the Contiguous United States, because of the distance to Alaska. He chose as his episcopal motto, "Pray with Confidence". He was installed in Juneau on April 2, 2009.

=== Bishop of Dallas ===
On December 13, 2016, Pope Francis appointed Burns as the eighth bishop of Dallas, to succeed then bishop Kevin Farrell. His installation was on February 9, 2017, at the Cathedral Shrine of the Virgin of Guadalupe in Dallas.

On August 18, 2018, Burns informed parishioners at St. Cecilia Parish in Dallas that their pastor, Reverend Edmundo Paredes, had been removed from ministry in 2017 because of verified allegations of child sexual abuse and the theft of parish funds. The diocese had immediately reported Paredes to law enforcement, but he fled the country before he could be arrested.

== See also ==
- Catholic Church in the United States
- Hierarchy of the Catholic Church
- Historical list of the Catholic bishops of the United States
- List of Catholic bishops in the United States
- Lists of popes, patriarchs, primates, archbishops, and bishops

Catholic Church titles
Preceded by Kevin Farrell	Bishop of Dallas; 2017–present	Incumbent
Preceded by Michael William Warfel	Bishop of Juneau; 2009–2017	Succeeded by Andrew E. Bellisario
