= Robert Dermot O'Flanagan =

Irish-born American prelate

His Excellency, The Most Reverend Robert Dermot O'Flanagan
- Bishop of Juneau
- See: Diocese of Juneau
- In office: October 3, 1951; June 19, 1968
- Successor: Francis Thomas Hurley

Orders
- Ordination: August 27, 1929 by Laurentius Schrijnen
- Consecration: October 3, 1951 by Francis Doyle Gleeson

Personal details
- Born: March 9, 1901 Lahinch, County Clare, Ireland
- Died: December 31, 1972 (aged 71) La Mesa, California, USA
- Denomination: Roman Catholic
- Education: Ignatius College

Robert Dermot O'Flanagan (March 9, 1901 – December 31, 1972) was an Irish-born American prelate of the Roman Catholic Church who served as the first bishop of the Diocese of Juneau in Alaska from 1951 to 1968.

== Biography ==
=== Early life ===
Robert O'Flanagan was born on March 9, 1901, in Lahinch, County Clare in Ireland. In 1908, he entered Belvedere College in Dublin. After graduating in 1971, he entered St Stanislaus College, a Jesuit novitiate in Tullabeg, County Offaly. In 1920, the Jesuits sent O'Flanagan to the Netherlands to study at Ignatius College in Valkenburg.

=== Priesthood ===
O'Flanagan was ordained to the priesthood for the Jesuit Order by Bishop Laurentius Schrijnen in Valkenburg on August 27, 1929. Returning to Ireland, he taught at Clongowes Wood College in County Kildare from 1930 to 1932. In 1932, dissatisfied with the Jesuit Order, he decided to leave it. At a eucharistic conference in Dublin, O'Flanagan met Reverend Patrick J. O'Reilly, a missionary from Alaska and the Pacific Northwest. After speaking with O'Reilly, he decided to go to Alaska on a three-month mission.

Arriving in Juneau, Alaska, in January 1933, O'Flanagan was assigned by Bishop Joseph Crimont as a pastor of a parish in Seward, Alaska, to fill in for a priest on leave. Arriving in Seward, he received a warm welcome from both Catholic and non-Catholic residents. Their hospitality encouraged him to stay in Alaska permanently. Later in 1933, O'Flanagan was assisting Reverend Dane, the pastor at Holy Family Parish in Anchorage. Dane wanted to take a medical leave and asked O'Flanagan to substitute at Holy Family. O'Flanagan would remain at Holy Family until 1951, eventually becoming pastor there. For 18 years, he would travel once a month to Seward, 120 miles from Anchorage, to minister to the parish there.

In 1936, O'Flanagan headed a civic group to establish a new hospital in Anchorage. The existing hospital, built by Alaska Railroad in 1915 primarily for its employees, was reaching its limits due to the increased population of the city. After obtaining local funding, O'Flanagan persuaded the Catholic Sisters of Providence to staff and operate the new hospital for the general public. Providence Hospital opened on June 29, 1939. O'Flanagan became a member of the operating committee for the first USO center in Anchorage. On November 30, 1943, O'Flanagan became a naturalized American citizen.

=== Bishop of Juneau ===
On July 9, 1951, O'Flanagan was appointed the first bishop of the newly erected Diocese of Juneau by Pope Pius XII. He received his episcopal consecration on October 3, 1951, from Bishop Francis Gleeson, with Bishops Charles White and Joseph Dougherty serving as co-consecrators. O'Flanagan attended all four sessions of the Second Vatican Council in Rome between 1962 and 1965.

O'Flanagan's early resignation as bishop of the Diocese of Juneau due to poor health was accepted by Pope Paul VI on June 19, 1968. He soon left Juneau to live at a Catholic retirement home in La Mesa, California. Dermot O'Flanagan died in La Mesa on December 31, 1972.

== See also ==
- Catholic Church hierarchy
- Historical list of the Catholic bishops of the United States
- List of Catholic bishops of the United States
- Lists of patriarchs, archbishops, and bishops

Catholic Church titles
Preceded by none	Bishop of Juneau; 1951–1968	Succeeded by Francis Thomas Hurley
