= Francis Thomas Hurley =

American prelate

His Excellency, The Most Reverend Francis Thomas Hurley
- Archbishop of Anchorage
- See: Archdiocese of Anchorage
- In office: May 4, 1976; March 3, 2001
- Predecessor: John Joseph Thomas Ryan
- Successor: Roger Lawrence Schwietz
- Other posts: Bishop of Juneau; Auxiliary Bishop of Juneau

Orders
- Ordination: June 16, 1951 by John Joseph Mitty
- Consecration: March 19, 1970 by Mark Joseph Hurley

Personal details
- Born: January 12, 1927 San Francisco, California, US
- Died: January 10, 2016 (aged 88) Anchorage, Alaska, US
- Denomination: Roman Catholic

Styles of Francis Thomas Hurley
- Reference style: The Most Reverend
- Spoken style: Your Excellency
- Religious style: Monsignor

Francis Thomas Hurley (January 12, 1927 – January 10, 2016) was an American prelate of the Catholic Church who served as archbishop of the Archdiocese of Anchorage in Alaska from 1976 to 2001. He previously served as bishop of the Diocese of Juneau in Alaska from 1971 to 1976 and as auxiliary bishop there from 1970 to 1971.

== Biography ==
=== Early life ===
Francis Hurley was born in San Francisco, California, one of five children of Mark Hurley and Josephine (née Keohane) Hurley. Francis Hurley was ordained to the priesthood by Archbishop John Mitty on June 16, 1951.

=== Auxiliary Bishop and Bishop of Juneau ===
On February 4, 1970, Hurley was appointed auxiliary bishop and apostolic administrator of the Diocese of Juneau and titular bishop of Daimlaig by Pope Paul VI. Hurley received his episcopal consecration on March 19, 1970, from Bishop Mark Hurley, his brother, with Bishops William McManus and Joseph Bernardin, serving as co-consecrators.

Pope Paul appointed Hurley as the second bishop of Juneau on July 20, 1971; he was installed on September 8, 1971. During his tenure, Hurley expanded Catholic ministry in the smaller and more remote communities of the diocese, getting his pilot's license so he could fly there. Hurley helped implement the reforms of the Second Vatican Council, such as promoting more active roles for the laity.

=== Archbishop of Anchorage ===
Paul VI appointed Hurley as the second archbishop of the Archdiocese of Anchorage on May 4, 1976. He was installed on July 8, 1976.

Pope John Paul II accepted Hurley's resignation as archbishop of Anchorage on March 3, 2001. After his retirement, Hurley stayed active in the church. In 2010, he presided over the funeral of former Alaskan Governor Wally Hickel. Hurley died in Anchorage on January 10, 2016, at age 88, after suffering from heart disease since at least 2010.

== See also ==
- Catholic Church hierarchy
- Catholic Church in the United States
- Historical list of the Catholic bishops of the United States
- List of Catholic bishops of the United States
- Lists of patriarchs, archbishops, and bishops

Catholic Church titles
Preceded by –	Archbishop Emeritus of Anchorage; 2001–2016	Succeeded by –
Preceded by John Ryan	Archbishop of Anchorage; 1976–2001	Succeeded by Roger Schwietz, OMI
Preceded by Robert O'Flanagan	Bishop of Juneau; 1971–1976	Succeeded by Michael Kenny
Preceded by –	Auxiliary Bishop of Juneau; 1970–1971	Succeeded by –
