= William Joseph Condon =

American prelate

His Excellency, The Most Reverend William Joseph Condon
- Bishop of Great Falls
- Church: Roman Catholic Church
- See: Great Falls
- Appointed: August 5, 1939
- Term ended: August 17, 1967
- Predecessor: Edwin Vincent O'Hara
- Successor: Eldon Bernard Schuster

Orders
- Ordination: October 14, 1917 by Augustine Francis Schinner
- Consecration: October 18, 1939 by: Charles Daniel White; Joseph Francis McGrath; Edward Kelly

Personal details
- Born: April 7, 1895 Colton, Washington US
- Died: August 17, 1967 (aged 72) Great Falls, Montana, US
- Buried: Mount Olivet Cemetery, Great Falls
- Parents: Patrick Condon; Mary Elizabeth Kavanaugh
- Education: Gonzaga University

William Joseph Condon (April 7, 1895 – August 17, 1967) was an American prelate of the Roman Catholic Church. He served as bishop of the Diocese of Great Falls in Montana from 1939 until his death.

== Biography ==
=== Early life ===
William Condon was born on April 7, 1895, in Colton, Washington, to Patrick and Mary Elizabeth (née Kavanaugh) Condon. He graduated from St. Patrick's Seminary in Menlo Park, California, in 1917.

=== Priesthood ===
Condon was ordained to the priesthood in Spokane, Washington, by Bishop Augustine Francis Schinner for the Diocese of Spokane on October 14, 1917. After his ordination, the diocese assigned him as a curate at the Cathedral of Our Lady of Lourdes Parish in Spokane.

Condon served as pastor of St. Joseph's Parish in Waterville, Washington, for four years. From 1923 to 1929, he was rector of the cathedral. While serving as pastor of St. Augustine's Parish in Spokane between 1929 and 1939, he also served as secretary to Bishop Charles White (1928–1932), as chancellor (1927–1939) and as vicar general (1933–1939) of the diocese.

=== Bishop of Great Falls ===
On August 5, 1939, Condon was appointed the third bishop of Great Falls by Pope Pius XII. He received his episcopal consecration at the Cathedral of Our Lady of Lourdes on October 18, 1939, from Bishop Charles White, with Bishops Joseph Francis McGrath and Edward Kelly serving as co-consecrators. He was installed in St. Ann's Cathedral on October 26, 1939. Condon led the diocese for twenty-seven years; he was the longest-serving bishop of the diocese. Between 1962 and 1965, he attended the Second Vatican Council in Rome.

Condon died in Great Falls on August 16, 1967, at age 72, and is buried at Mount Olivet Cemetery in Great Falls.

Catholic Church titles
Preceded by Edwin Vincent O'Hara	Bishop of Great Falls; 1939–1967	Succeeded by Eldon Bernard Schuster
