= Eldon Bernard Schuster =

American prelate (1911–1998)

His Excellency, The Most Reverend Eldon Bernard Schuster
- Bishop of Great Falls titular bishop of Amblada
- See: Diocese of Great Falls
- In office: 1967–1977
- Predecessor: William Joseph Condon
- Successor: Thomas Joseph Murphy

Orders
- Ordination: May 27, 1937 by Edwin Vincent O'Hara
- Consecration: December 21, 1962 by Egidio Vagnozzi

Personal details
- Born: March 10, 1911 Calio, North Dakota, US
- Died: September 4, 1998 (aged 87) Great Falls, Montana, US
- Denomination: Roman Catholic
- Parents: John Francis and Leona Marie (née Osborn) Schuster
- Education: Loras College; Catholic University of America; Oxford University; Saint Louis University
- Motto: Amoris officium pascere gregem (It is love's obligation to feed the flock)

Eldon Bernard Schuster (March 10, 1911 – September 4, 1998) was an American prelate of the Roman Catholic Church. He served as bishop of the Diocese of Great Falls in Montana from 1961 until 1977.

== Biography ==
=== Early life ===
Eldon Schuster was born on March 10, 1911, in Calio, North Dakota, to John Francis and Leona Marie (née Osborn) Schuster. He attended Loras College in Dubuque, Iowa, and the Catholic University of America in Washington, D.C.

=== Priesthood ===
Schuster was ordained to the priesthood in Great Falls, Montana, by Archbishop Edwin Vincent O’Hara for the Diocese of Great Falls on May 27, 1937. He made his postgraduate studies at Oxford University in England (1938–1939) and served as vice-chancellor of the diocese (1941–1943). Schuster served as rector of St. Ann's Cathedral in Great Falls (1943–1946) before attending Saint Louis University in St. Louis, Missouri. He became superintendent of Catholic schools in the diocese in 1946, and was named a domestic prelate by the Vatican in 1949.

=== Auxiliary Bishop and Bishop of Great Falls ===
On October 30, 1961, Schuster was appointed auxiliary bishop of Great Falls and titular bishop of Amblada by Pope John XXIII. He received his episcopal consecration at St. Ann's Cathedral on December 21, 1961, from Archbishop Egidio Vagnozzi, with Bishops William Joseph Condon and Joseph Michael Gilmore serving as co-consecrators. Following the death of Bishop Condon, Schuster was named the fourth bishop of Great Falls on December 2, 1967 by Pope Paul VI.

After ten years as bishop, Schuster resigned; Paul VI accepted his resignation on December 27, 1977.Eldon Schuster died in Great Falls on September 4, 1998, at age 87.

Catholic Church titles
Preceded by William Joseph Condon	Bishop of Great Falls; 1967–1977	Succeeded by Thomas Joseph Murphy
