= St. Patrick's Co-Cathedral (Billings, Montana) =

St. Patrick’s Co-Cathedral
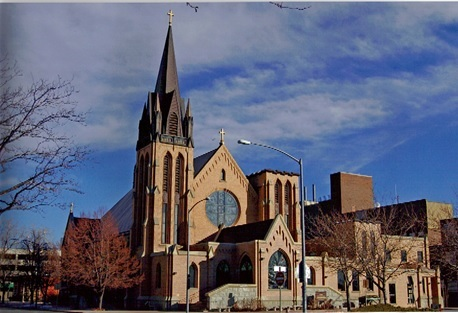

- Location in Montana St. Patrick’s Co-Cathedral (the United States)
- 45°46′55″N 108°30′39″W
- Location: 215 N. 31st St. Billings, Montana
- Country: United States
- Denomination: Roman Catholic
- Website: stpatrickcocathedral.org

History
- Status: Cathedral
- Founded: 1904

Architecture
- Style: Gothic Revival
- Completed: 1904
- Construction cost: $64,300

Specifications
- Materials: Brick

Administration
- Diocese: Great Falls-Billings

Clergy
- Bishop: Most Rev. Jeffrey M. Fleming
- Pastor: Rev. Leo McDowell

St. Patrick's Co-Cathedral is a Catholic cathedral in Billings, Montana, United States. Along with St. Ann's Cathedral in Great Falls, Montana it is the seat of the Diocese of Great Falls-Billings.

== History ==
=== St. Patrick’s Parish ===
The first parish in Billings was named St. Joachim, and it was established in 1887. By the turn of the 20th century Billings was in need of a larger church and St. Patrick's was established. The present church building was built in the Gothic Revival style in 1904 for $64,000.

An extensive renovation of the church took place in 1954. The altar, communion rail, Stations of the Cross and pews were all replaced with new furnishings. A new rose window graced the choir loft. Interior decorative painting was done in a Byzantine style. Changes were made to the exterior as well. Further modifications were made to the interior of the church in the 1960s and 1970s in response to the liturgical reforms of the Second Vatican Council. The side altars and communion rail were removed. The present marble altar, ambo and wood paneling were installed.

=== St. Patrick’s Co-Cathedral ===
Pope John Paul II renamed the Diocese of Great Falls as the Diocese of Great Falls-Billings on February 14, 1980. At that time St. Patrick's Church joined St. Ann's Cathedral in Great Falls as the co-cathedral of the diocese. Further renovations to the cathedral's interior took place in the 1990s. The choir was moved to the front of the worship space. New sacristies and a new gathering space were added to the church.

== See also ==
- List of Catholic cathedrals in the United States
- List of cathedrals in the United States
