= Schiner =

Schiner or Schinner is a Germanic surname that may refer to

- Augustine Francis Schinner (1863–1937), American prelate of the Roman Catholic Church
- Ignaz Rudolph Schiner (1813–1873) Austrian entomologist
- Matthäus Schiner (or Schinner, c.1465–1522), Swiss bishop of Sion, Cardinal and diplomat
