= Calio, North Dakota =

- City
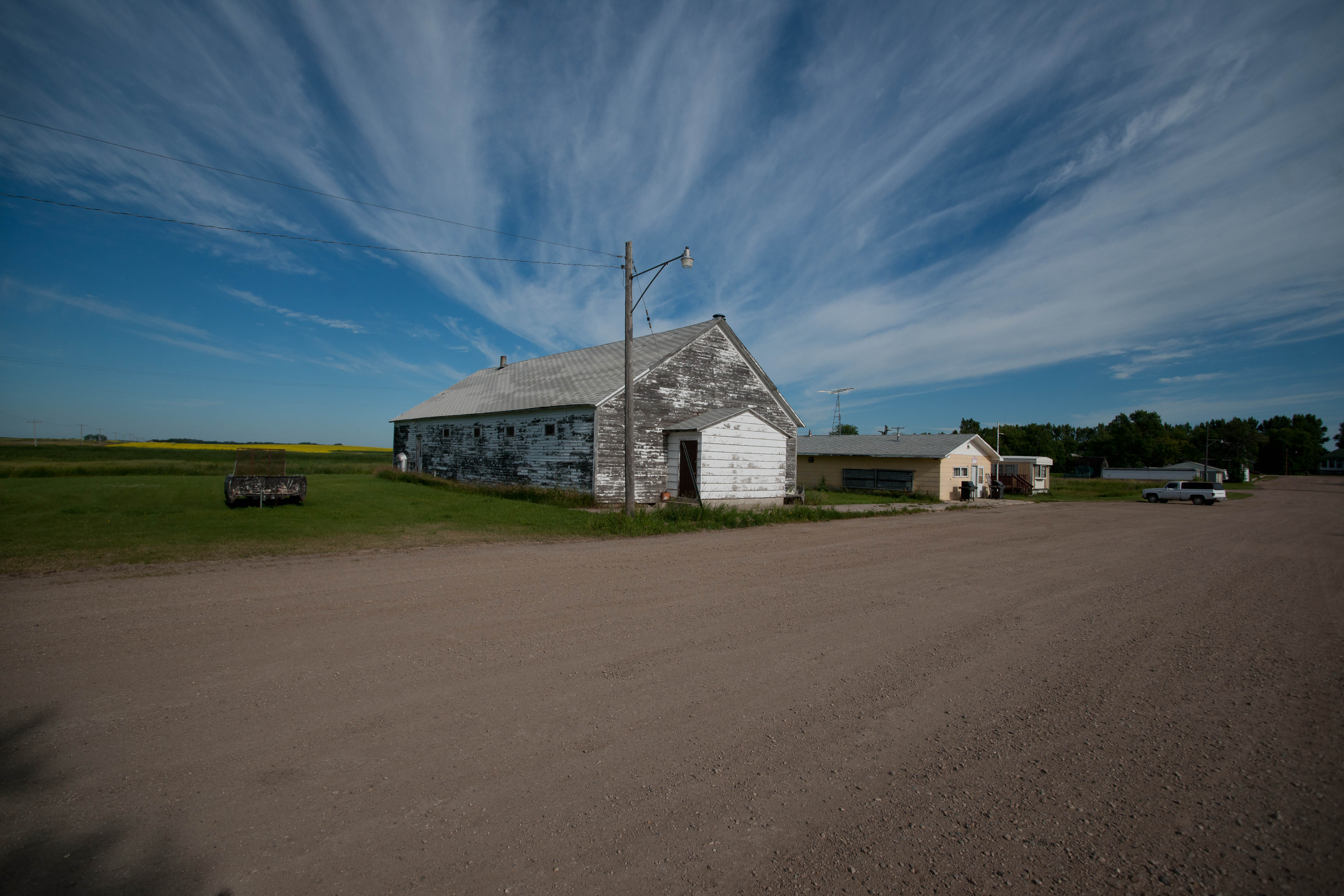
- Building in Calio

- Location of Calio, North Dakota
- Coordinates: 48°37′26″N 98°56′17″W
- Country: United States
- State: North Dakota
- County: Cavalier
- Founded: 1905

Area
  - Total: 8.91 sq mi (23.08 km^{2})
  - Land: 8.17 sq mi (21.17 km^{2})
  - Water: 0.74 sq mi (1.91 km^{2})
- Elevation: 1,562 ft (476 m)

Population (2020)
  - Total: 8
  - Estimate (2024): 6
  - Density: 0.98/sq mi (0.38/km^{2})
- Time zone: UTC–6 (Central (CST))
  - Summer (DST): UTC–5 (CDT)
- ZIP Code: 58352
- Area code: 701
- FIPS code: 38-11580
- GNIS feature ID: 1035950

Calio is a city in Cavalier County, North Dakota, United States. The population was 8 at the 2020 census. Calio was founded in 1905.

== Geography ==
According to the United States Census Bureau, the city has a total area of 8.91 square miles (23.08 km^{2}), of which 8.17 square miles (21.16 km^{2}) is land and 0.74 square miles (1.92 km^{2}) is water.

== Demographics ==
Historical population
Census	Pop.	Note	%±
1920	132		—
1930	152		15.2%
1940	98		−35.5%
1950	102		4.1%
1960	101		−1.0%
1970	75		−25.7%
1980	60		−20.0%
1990	43		−28.3%
2000	24		−44.2%
2010	22		−8.3%
2020	8		−63.6%
2024 (est.)	6		−25.0%
U.S. Decennial Census; 2020 Census

=== 2010 census ===
As of the 2010 census, there were 22 people, 9 households, and 5 families residing in the city. The population density was 2.7 inhabitants per square mile (1.0/km^{2}). There were 13 housing units at an average density of 1.6 per square mile (0.6/km^{2}). The racial makeup of the city was 100.0% White.

There were 9 households, of which 22.2% had children under the age of 18 living with them, 55.6% were married couples living together, and 44.4% were non-families. 44.4% of all households were made up of individuals, and 33.3% had someone living alone who was 65 years of age or older. The average household size was 2.44 and the average family size was 3.60.

The median age in the city was 43.5 years. 31.8% of residents were under the age of 18; 0.0% were between the ages of 18 and 24; 18.1% were from 25 to 44; 18.1% were from 45 to 64; and 31.8% were 65 years of age or older. The gender makeup of the city was 50.0% male and 50.0% female.

=== 2000 census ===
As of the 2000 census, there were 24 people, 9 households, and 6 families residing in the city. The population density was 2.9 people per square mile (1.1/km^{2}). There were 17 housing units at an average density of 2.1 per square mile (0.8/km^{2}). The racial makeup of the city was 100.00% White.

There were 9 households, out of which 22.2% had children under the age of 18 living with them, 55.6% were married couples living together, and 33.3% were non-families. 33.3% of all households were made up of individuals, and 11.1% had someone living alone who was 65 years of age or older. The average household size was 2.67 and the average family size was 3.50.

In the city, the population was spread out, with 37.5% under the age of 18, 25.0% from 25 to 44, 29.2% from 45 to 64, and 8.3% who were 65 years of age or older. The median age was 35 years. For every 100 females, there were 71.4 males. For every 100 females age 18 and over, there were 87.5 males.

The median income for a household in the city was $11,875, and the median income for a family was $12,917. Males had a median income of $12,917 versus $0 for females. The per capita income for the city was $3,711. There are 40.0% of families living below the poverty line and 61.1% of the population, including 100.0% of under 18 and none of those over 64.

== Notable person ==
- Eldon Bernard Schuster, fourth Bishop of Great Falls
