= Mathias Clement Lenihan =

Roman Catholic Church bishop (1854–1943)

His Excellency, The Right Reverend Mathias C. Lenihan
- Bishop of Great Falls; Titular Archbishop of Preslavus
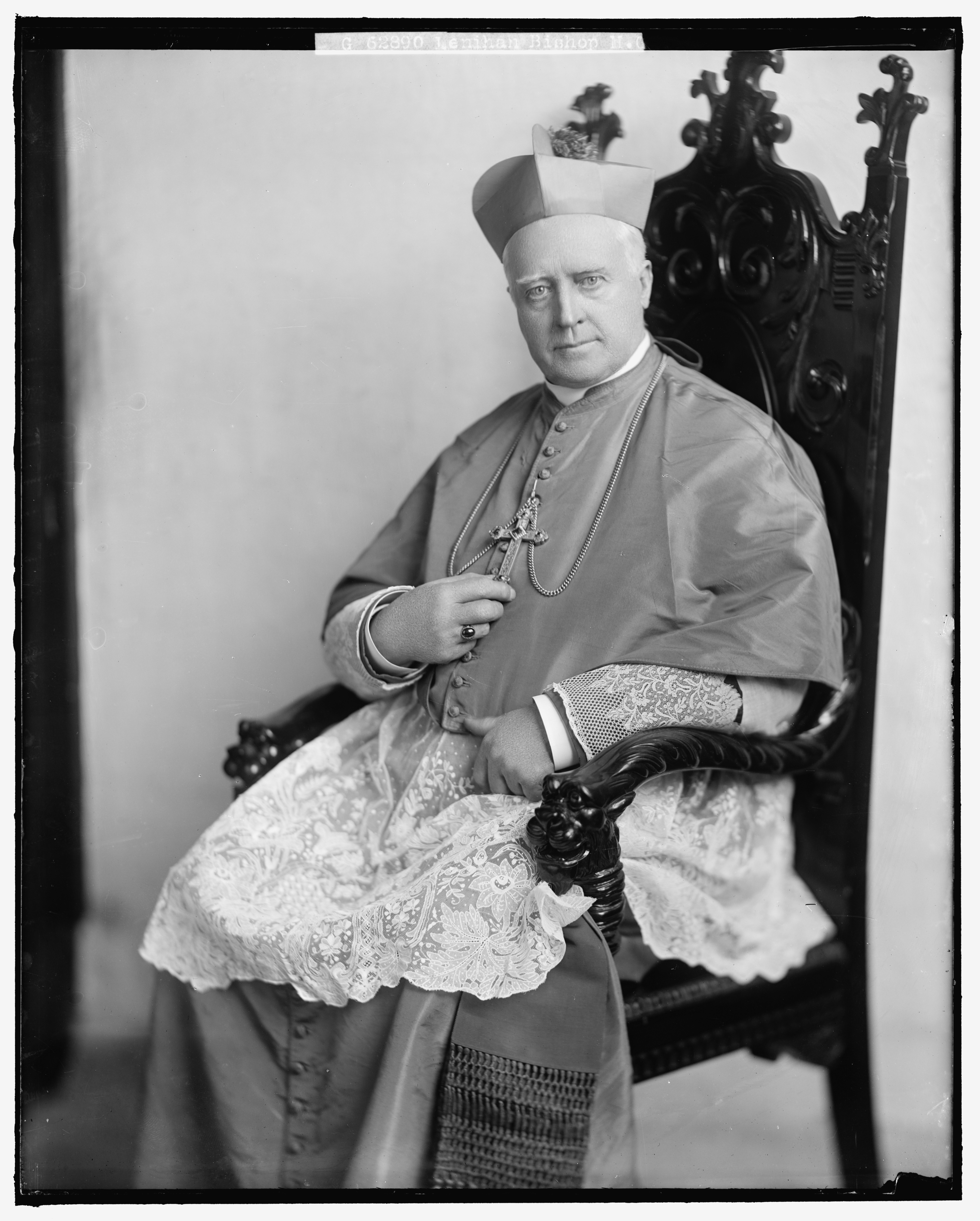
- Bishop Lenihan in 1905
- Church: Catholic Church
- See: Great Falls
- In office: August 26, 1904 – January 18, 1930
- Predecessor: None
- Successor: Edwin Vincent O'Hara

Orders
- Ordination: December 20, 1879 by John Hennessy
- Consecration: September 21, 1904 by John Joseph Keane

Personal details
- Born: October 6, 1854 Dubuque, Iowa
- Died: August 19, 1943 (aged 88) Dubuque
- Education: St. Joseph College; St. John's College; Grand Séminaire de Montréal

Mathias Clement Lenihan (October 6, 1854 – August 19, 1943) was a 20th-century archbishop in the Catholic Church in the United States. He served as bishop of the Diocese of Great Falls in the state of Montana from 1904 to 1930.

== Biography ==
=== Early life and ministry ===
Born on October 6, 1854, in Dubuque, Iowa, Mathias Lenihan was educated at St. Joseph College in Dubuque, Iowa, St. John's College in Prairie du Chien, Wisconsin and the Grand Séminaire de Montréal in Montreal, Quebec.

Lenihan was ordained a priest in Montreal on December 20, 1879, by Archbishop Édouard-Charles Fabre for the Diocese of Dubuque. He was the first native-born Iowan to be ordained a priest. From the time of his ordination until 1904 he was involved in parish ministry in the diocese, and later archdiocese, of Dubuque. His first assignment was at a parish in Vail, Iowa and his second was at Marshalltown, Iowa. In Marshalltown he founded St. Thomas Hospital, named in memory of his brother, Bishop Thomas Mathias Lenihan of the Diocese of Cheyenne.

=== Bishop of Great Falls ===
On August 26, 1904 Pope Pius X named Lenihan as the first bishop of Great Falls. He was consecrated a bishop at Saint Raphael Cathedral in Dubuque on September 21, 1904, by Archbishop John Joseph Keane of Dubuque. The co-consecrators were Bishops James John Keane of Cheyenne and Joseph Bernard Cotter, of Winona. He was installed on November 5, 1904, at St. Ann Cathedral in Great Falls, Montana.

Lenihan served the diocese for 26 years. He was involved in temperance reform, building the parochial school system in the diocese, and constructing a new cathedral. The new St. Ann Cathedral in Great Falls was dedicated on December 15, 1907. He was instrumental in establishing an orphanage staffed by the Sisters of Charity of Providence. The diocese also established several new parishes during his episcopate.

Pope Pius XI accepted Lenihan's resignation as bishop of Great Falls on January 18, 1930. He was named titular archbishop of Preslavus on February 14, 1930. Lenihan retired to Dubuque, where he died on August 19, 1943.

Catholic Church titles
Preceded by None	Bishop of Great Falls; 1904–1930	Succeeded by Edwin Vincent O'Hara
