= O'Hara Catholic School =

Catholic school in Eugene, Oregon, U.S.

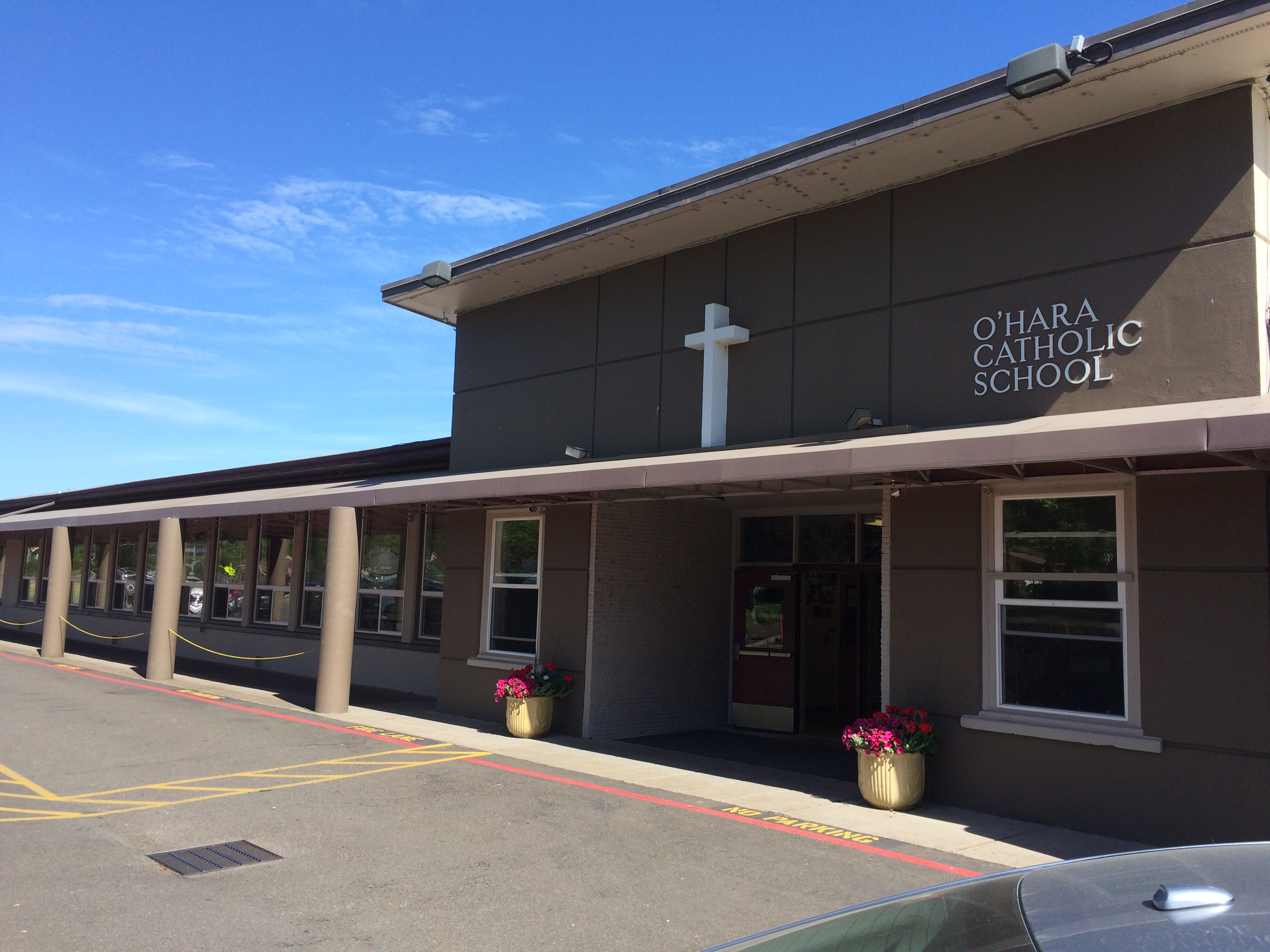
- O'Hara Catholic School

Location
- 715 West 18th Avenue, Eugene, Oregon; 44°2′28.8708″N 123°6′9.7128″W

Information
- Established: 1889
- Grades: Preschool-8

O'Hara Catholic School is a private, coeducational Catholic K–8 school in Eugene, Oregon, United States, serving ten parishes of the Roman Catholic Archdiocese of Portland in Oregon. It was originally established in 1889 as the parochial school for St. Mary Roman Catholic Church in downtown Eugene, and became an area school in 1971. It is accredited through Western Catholic Educational Association.

== History ==
Fr. Francis S. Beck (pastor from 1887 to 1894) saw the need to establish a Catholic school in the Eugene area. He arranged for some Benedictine Sisters from Mt. Angel to run a school in Eugene from a "four-room building which faced Willamette Street." The sisters arrived in 1889. The school was called the "Academy of Our Lady of Victory," affectionately known as St. Mary School. Later in 1895, the Sisters of Mercy took over for the school. During Fr. John A. Moran's time as pastor (from 1911 to 1920), the Sisters of Mercy took over the Eugene General Hospital on College Hill in 1912. Consequently, Fr. Moran arranged to have six Sisters of the Holy Names come to run the school in 1916.

In 1919, Fr. Moran had purchased property in the West 11th Avenue block between Charnelton and Lincoln streets. Later, Fr. Edwin V. O'Hara (pastor from 1920 to 1929) would move the Holy Names sisters in 1921 to the house at 1116 Charnelton St., which is currently part of the Poole-Larsen Funeral Chapel. The school building was moved to northeast corner of 11th and Lincoln.

In 1921, the State Superintendent of Schools, J. A. Churchill, would accept St. Mary as a "standard school" of the State of Oregon.

During the time of Fr. Edmund Murnane (pastor from 1950 to 1969) an eight-classroom addition to St. Francis High School was built on the property on 18th Avenue and Jefferson Street for a junior high school, which was used for the upper grades of St. Mary School. It was called St. Mary's Junior High School. Work began on the additions in January 1955. St. Francis High School was relocated to what is now Marist High School. All of St. Mary school was moved to the location on 18th and Jefferson in June 1969.

Under Fr. Emil H. Kies (pastor from 1969 to 1987), St. Mary Grade School became an area school in which "participating parishes selected the lay members of a policy-making school board and each parish agreed to subsidize those students of St. Mary's School who lived within its boundaries." The plan was accepted in 1971. It was in the fall of 1978 that the school was renamed O'Hara Catholic School in honor of Bishop Edwin V. O'Hara, a former pastor of St. Mary's Parish and School.

In the late 1960s, the school ceased to be the "sisters' school" with the decline of religious vocations and the increase of lay teachers. Today O'Hara Catholic School is staffed completely by lay teachers with religious and diocesan priests coming regularly to visit the classrooms.
