= Diocese of Great Falls–Billings =

Latin Catholic jurisdiction in the US

Coordinates: 47°30′13″N 111°17′10.67″W

Diocese of Great Falls–Billings Dioecesis Magnocataractensis–Billingensis
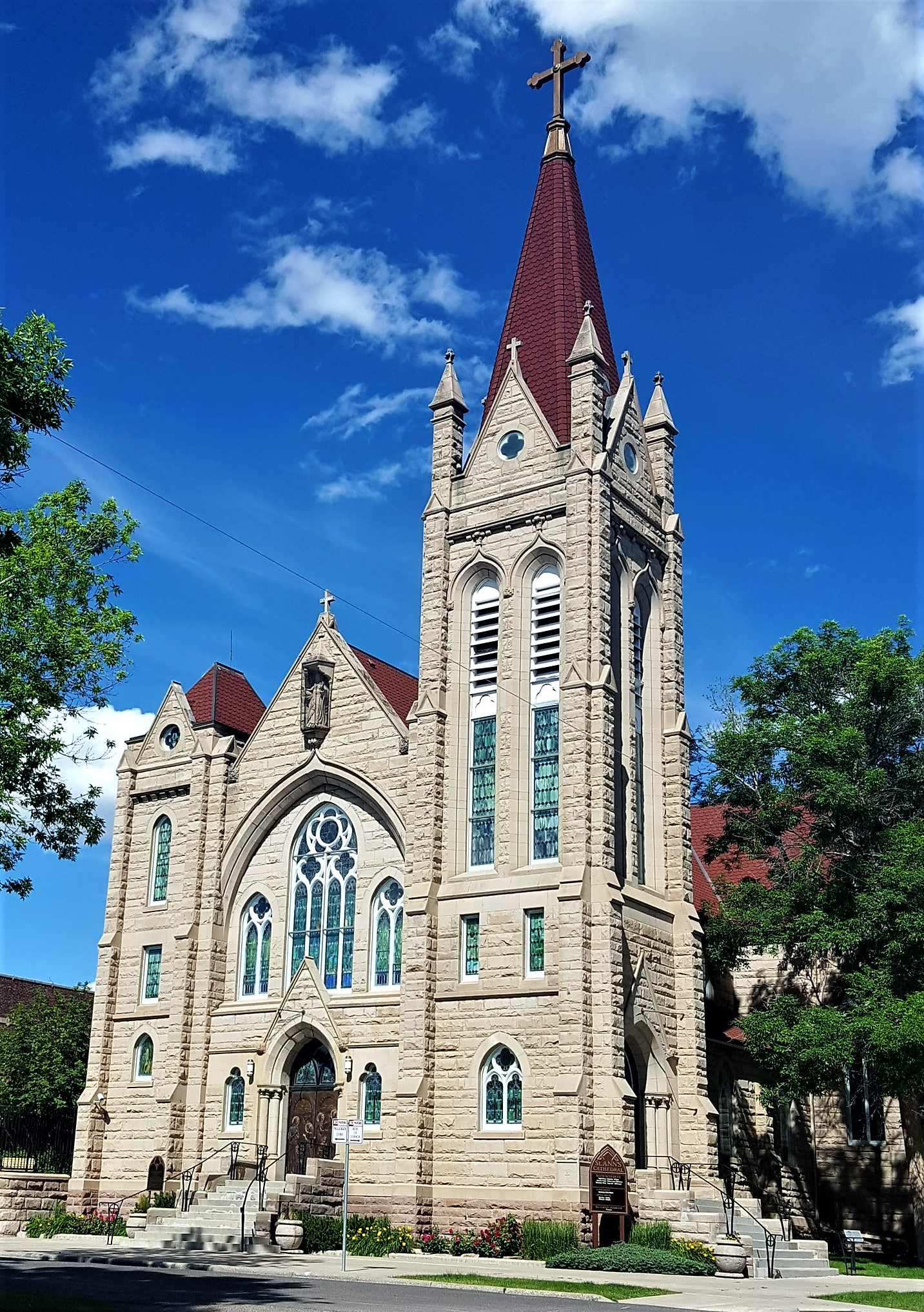
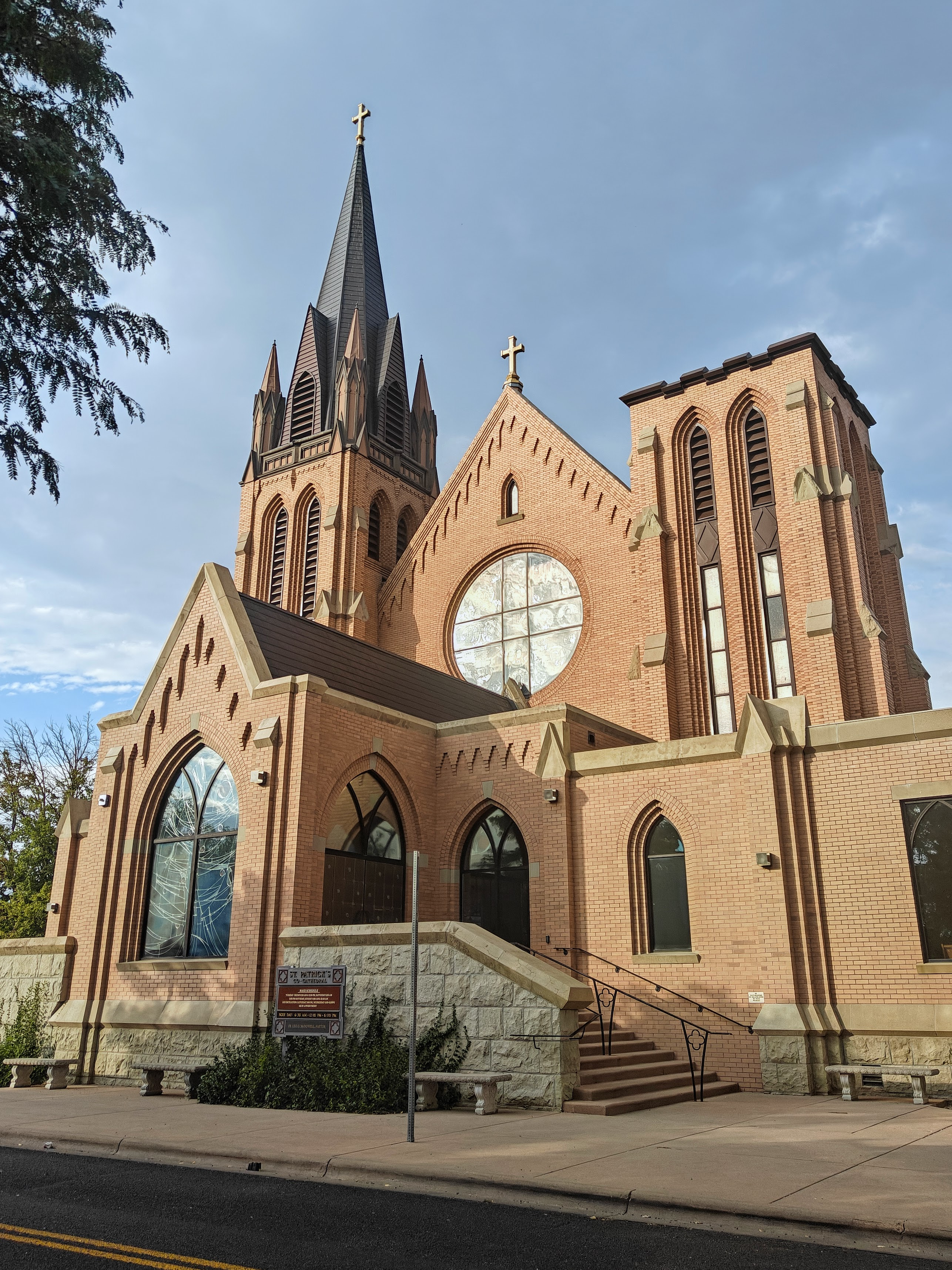
- St. Ann's Cathedral St. Patrick's Co-Cathedral

- Coat of Arms of the Diocese of Great Falls-Billings

Location
- Country: United States
- Territory: Big Horn, Blaine, Carbon, Carter, Cascade, Chouteau, Custer, Daniels, Dawson, Fallon, Fergus, Garfield, Golden Valley, Hill, Judith Basin, Liberty, McCone, Musselshell, Park, Petroleum, Phillips, Powder River, Prairie, Richland, Roosevelt, Rosebud, Sheridan, Stillwater, Sweet Grass, Treasure, Valley, Wibaux and Yellowstone counties in eastern Montana
- Ecclesiastical province: Province of Portland
- Population: 51,629 (13.2%)

Information
- Denomination: Catholic
- Sui iuris church: Latin Church
- Rite: Roman Rite
- Established: May 18, 1904
- Cathedral: St. Ann's Cathedral (Great Falls)
- Co-cathedral: St. Patrick's Co-Cathedral (Billings)
- Patron saint: St. Matthias the Apostle; St. Pius X

Current leadership
- Pope: Leo XIV
- Bishop: Jeffrey M. Fleming
- Metropolitan Archbishop: Alexander King Sample
- Bishops emeritus: Michael W. Warfel

Map
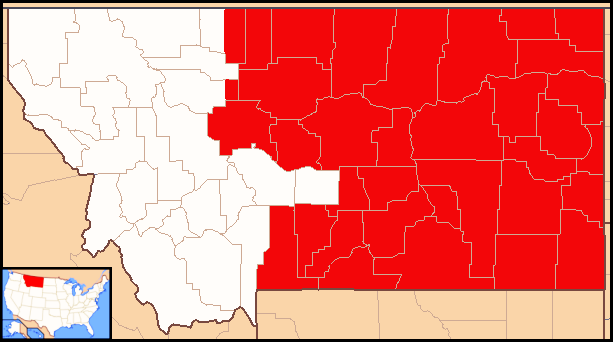

Website
- diocesegfb.org

The Diocese of Great Falls–Billings (Latin: Dioecesis Magnocataractensis–Billingensis) is a diocese of the Catholic Church in eastern Montana in the United States. It was established in 1904; it became the Diocese of Great Falls-Billings in 1980. The bishop is Jeffrey Fleming. The diocese has two cathedrals: St Ann's Cathedral in Great Falls, dedicated in 1907, and St Patrick's Co-Cathedral in Billings, dedicated in 1908.

== History ==
=== 1800 to 1883 ===
The earliest Catholic presence in present-day Montana was the arrival of Catholic Iroquois/Haudenosaunee fur traders who settled with the Flathead Nation in western Montana around 1811. After hearing about Catholic missionaries from the Iroquois visitors, the Flathead nation sent emissaries to St. Louis, Missouri, four times in the 1830s to petition the Diocese of St. Louis for their own missionaries. At that time, the diocese was responsible for large territories east of the Rocky Mountains.

Finally, in 1840, the Diocese of St. Louis sent missionary priest Pierre-Jean de Smet to Montana. Encouraged by his reception by the Flathead Nation, de Smet returned the following year to establish missions. The missions founded by Jesuit missionaries in eastern Montana included one in St. Xavier for the Crow Nation (1840) and St. Peter's Mission near Cascade for Métis settlers from Canada (1874).

=== 1883 to 1900 ===
In 1883, Pope Leo XIII erected the Apostolic Vicariate of Montana, including eastern Montana, with territory taken from the Diocese of St. Louis. He appointed Bishop Jean-Baptiste Brondel of the Diocese of Vancouver Island as the apostolic vicar.

One year later, the same pope created the Diocese of Helena to replace the vicariate. Eastern Montana would be part of the Diocese of Helena for the next 21 years. In 1884, Brondel purchased land in present-day Ashland to found the St. Labre Indian School, staffed by Ursuline Order sisters.

The first Catholic parish in Billings, St. Patrick's, was established in 1887.

=== 1900 to 1930 ===
Pope Pius X erected the Diocese of Great Falls on May 18, 1904, taking eastern Montana from the Diocese of Helena. The pope named Mathias Lenihan from the Diocese of Dubuque as the first bishop of the new diocese.

Lenihan served as bishop for 26 years. He was involved in temperance reform, building the parochial school system, and constructing a new cathedral. The new St. Ann Cathedral in Great Falls was dedicated in 1907. Lenihan was instrumental in establishing an orphanage staffed by the Sisters of Charity of Providence.

In 1913, Lenihan introduced Benedictine sisters from Germany to minister to minister in Poplar to Native Americans at the Fort Peck Indian Reservation. The diocese also established several new parishes during his episcopate. Lenihan retired in 1930.

=== 1930 to 1980 ===
The second bishop of Great Falls was Edwin O'Hara from the Diocese of Oregon City, nominated in 1930. Concerned at the lack of catechetical education among rural Catholic children, O'Hara introduced the Confraternity of Christian Doctrine (CCD) program in 1930. O'Hara worked to implement CCD throughout his diocese and the United States. His efforts led to a revitalization of CCD and rapid adoption of it throughout the country. By 1934, more than 400 adult CCD groups existed in the diocese. The movement spread nationwide, with tens of thousands of adult groups. O'Hara became bishop of the Diocese of Kansas City in 1939.

William Condon from the Diocese of Spokane succeeded O'Hara. Condon retired in 1967. His replacement was Auxiliary Bishop Eldon Schuster of Great Falls. Shuster retired in 1977.In 1978, Thomas Murphy of the Archdiocese of Chicago succeeded him.

=== 1980 to 2010 ===
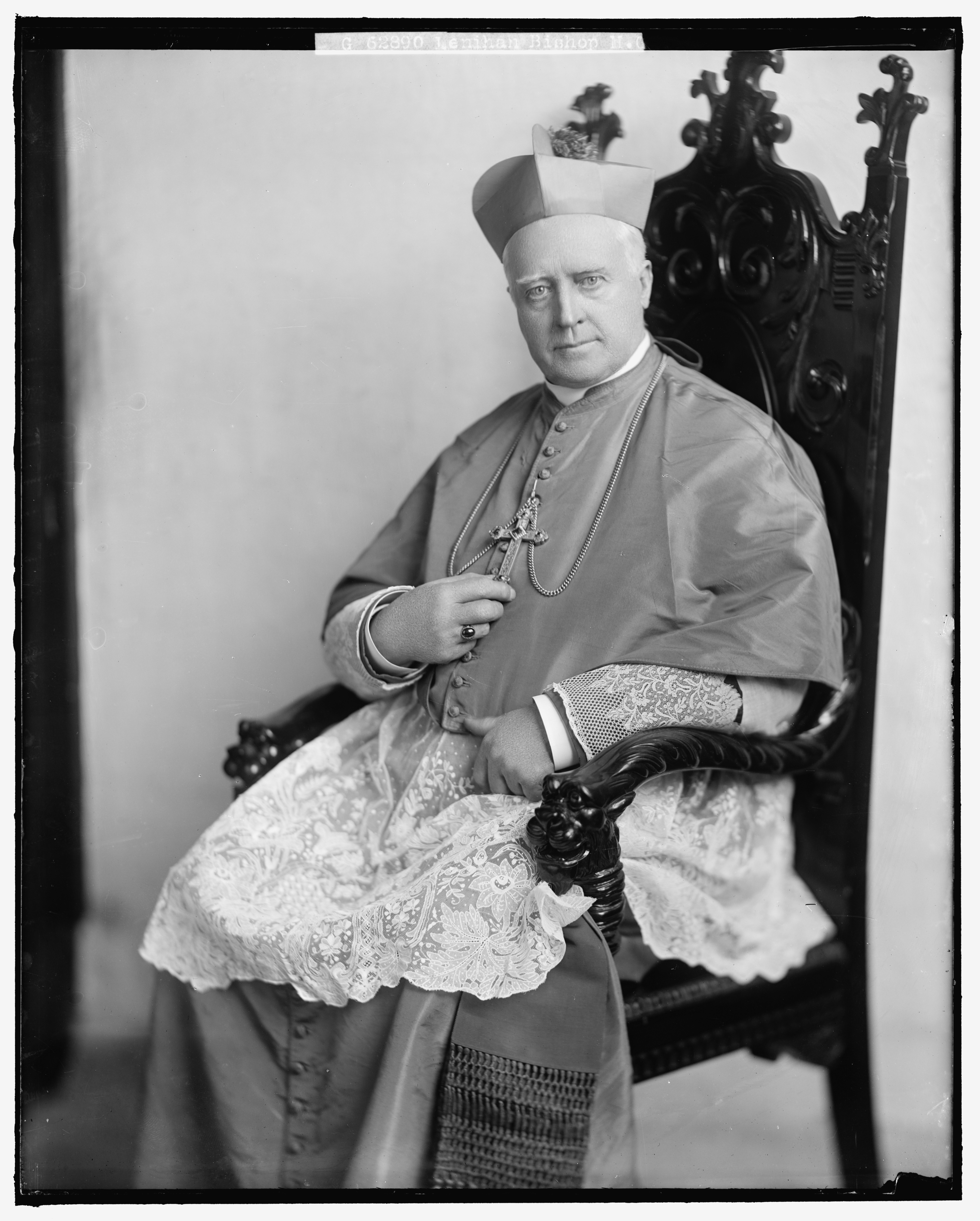
Bishop Lenihan (1905)

On February 14, 1980, Pope John Paul II renamed the Diocese of Great Falls to the Diocese of Great Falls-Billings. In 1987, Murphy became the coadjutor archbishop of the Archdiocese of Seattle.

To replace Murphy in Great Falls-Billings, John Paul II appointed Auxiliary Bishop Anthony Milone from the Archdiocese of Omaha. In 2005, the Northern Cheyenne Nation sued the St. Labre Indian School in Ashland and the Diocese of Great Falls-Billings. The plaintiff alleged that both organizations used the tribe's poverty to raise millions of dollars, but shared almost none of it with the nation. The lawsuit claimed breach of contract, cultural genocide, fraud, and unjust enrichment.

Murphy retired early in 2006 due to health concerns. Pope Benedict XVI then named Bishop Michael Warfel from the Diocese of Juneau as the next bishop of Great Falls-Billings.

=== 2010 to present ===
In 2013, the Montana Supreme Court reversed parts of a lower court ruling dismissing the Northern Cheyenne suit. However, the Supreme Court did say that the Northern Cheyenne had failed to prove allegations of breach of contract, negligent misrepresentation, fraud and wrongful conversion. The Northern Cheyenne and St. Labre School reached an out-of-court settlement in December 2014. The school agreed to pay the nation $6 million in 2014, $1 million per year from 2015 to 2019, and $60,000 per year beginning in 2020.

In early 2016, the diocese created the Diocese of Great Falls-Billings Juridic Persons Capital Assets Support Corporation, a non-profit organization. The diocese then transferred most of its cash and assets to CASC by the end of 2016. Critics accused the diocese of trying to protect the church's assets from victims' claims by transferring them to an organization it controlled. In March 2017, the diocese filed for Chapter 11 bankruptcy in the light of multiple lawsuits for sexual abuse of minors by clergy.

Warfel retired in 2023. Jeffrey M. Fleming, who had served as coadjutor bishop of the diocese since April 19, 2022, automatically became its bishop on August 22, 2023.

=== Sexual abuse ===
In 2012, the first of several sexual abuse lawsuits was filed against the diocese, alleging abuse of both boys and girls by diocesan clergy and employees. Over 60 plaintiffs had joined the suits by April 2015. By 2017, the diocese faced more than 400 potential sexual abuse lawsuits.

In March 2017, just weeks before the first sexual abuse trials were to begin, the diocese filed for Chapter 11 bankruptcy. The diocese then agreed to compensate 72 plaintiffs in the lawsuits and establish a fund to compensate future unknown victims. In response, the alleged victims and other church creditors sued the diocese in January 2018. They alleged that the diocese illegally triggered its bankruptcy by creating CASC, in what they termed as a fraudulent attempt to hide $16 million assets. The victims also argued that the assets of 14 of the 50 parishes should be considered diocesan assets and subject to entailment. (Note: The Diocese of Great Falls-Billings was incorporated as a corporation sole, which means that the diocese held title to all parish assets.) In response to this lawsuit, the diocese filed a motion to dismiss its bankruptcy proceeding. Another 14 victims came forward after the bankruptcy filing.

In April 2018, the diocese and the sexual abuse victims announced a new bankruptcy plan and settlement, requiring the diocese to begin "intensive background checks and screening of potential seminarians" and to publish a list of all known abusers, past and present, that were named in the lawsuits.

A federal court approved the new Great Falls-Billings bankruptcy plan in August 2018. The diocese would pay $20 million to 86 alleged victims, setting aside another $1.75 million to cover administrative costs and to compensate victims who come forward in the future. The 86 victims were to receive their payments within a month.

In November 2018, Lothar Krauth, a retired priest from Our Lady of Lourdes Parish in Great Falls, was arrested on charges of possessing child pornography. Local police found thousands of images of minors engaged in sexual activity in Krauth's residence. He pleaded guilty to receiving child pornography in April 2019 and was sentenced to five years in prison.

== Bishops ==
=== Bishops of Great Falls ===
1. Mathias Clement Lenihan (1904-1930)
2. Edwin Vincent O'Hara (1930-1939), appointed Bishop of Kansas City; later elevated to Archbishop (ad personam) in 1954
3. William Joseph Condon (1939-1967)
4. Eldon Bernard Schuster (1967-1977)
5. Thomas Joseph Murphy (1978-1980), title changed with title of diocese

=== Bishops of Great Falls-Billings ===
1. Thomas Joseph Murphy (1980-1987), appointed Coadjutor Archbishop of Seattle and subsequently succeeded to that see
2. Anthony Michael Milone (1987-2006)
3. Michael William Warfel (2007–2023)
4. Jeffrey M. Fleming (2023–present), coadjutor from 2022

=== Former auxiliary bishops ===
- Eldon Bernard Schuster (1961-1967), appointed Bishop of Great Falls

== Education ==
=== High Schools ===
As of 2025, the Diocese of Great Falls-Billings operates three high schools:

- Billings Central Catholic High School – Billings
- Great Falls Central Catholic High School – Great Falls
- St. Labre High School – Ashland, is a mission school for members of the Northern Cheyenne and Crow tribes

=== University ===
University of Providence – Great Falls, sponsored by the Sisters of Providence

== Hospitals ==
As of 2025, the diocese had two Catholic acute-care hospitals, both operated by Intermountain Health:

- Holy Rosary Hospital – Miles City,
- St. Vincent Regional Hospital – Billings

== Arms ==
Coat of arms of Diocese of Great Falls–Billings
Notes This version of the arms was adopted when the Diocese of Great Falls became a dual See City diocese. Adopted June 1980 Helm The escutcheon is crowned with a gold jeweled and pearled bishop's mitre pretiosa, with gold mantling folded behind the escutcheon. Escutcheon The arms of the diocese are composed of a main section that occupies the bottom two-thirds of the shield. This section of the shield is divided into four vertical sections, known as pales, of alternating blue and silver (white). These four sections are in the traditional heraldic colors of water and have straight edges. On these four pales are three cross fleury that are counterchanged, divided and colored opposite their background. The upper one-third of the shield, known as a chief, is silver (white) on which is displayed a red demi-sun. An inescutcheon, a small shield superimposed on the larger design, is in the center. The inescutcheon is divided into two halves, across the middle. The upper portion is gold (yellow) on which is placed a green trefoil, the heraldic representation of the shamrock. The lower portion is also gold and on this field is placed a blue pile (a V-shape). The gold portions of the inescutcheon contain small black dots, implying sagebrush or agricultural plantings. Symbolism The four pales of alternating blue and silver (white) symbolize water falling rapidly from a great height, and reflect the name of the prime See City of Great Falls. The three counterchanged crosses honor the Holy Trinity. The demi-sun on the chief represents the fact that the See City of Great Falls is located opposite the mouth of the Sun River. The trefoil on the inescutchen honors Saint Patrick, for whom the co-cathedral in Billings is named. The dotted gold fields represent the plains which surround the city of Billings. The blue charge represents the valley of the Yellowstone River, and is placed to give the illusion of the "rimrocks"—the cliffs that surround the city of Billings. Previous versions The arms without the inescutcheon were the arms of the Diocese of Great Falls from the time of its erection on May 18, 1904, until the Diocese of Great Falls became a dual See City diocese in June 1980.
