= St. Mary Roman Catholic Church (Eugene, Oregon) =

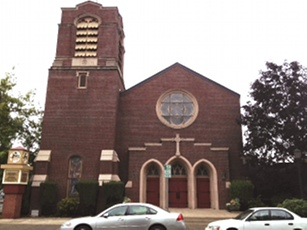
- St. Mary Catholic Church

- Location within Oregon
- 44°2′54.1″N 123°5′47.1″W
- Location: 1062 Charnelton Street, Eugene, Oregon
- Denomination: Roman Catholic

Architecture
- Architect: Joseph Jacobberger
- Architectural type: Modified Gothic
- Completed: 1927

Administration
- Archdiocese: Roman Catholic Archdiocese of Portland

The St. Mary Roman Catholic Church (full name: St. Mary, Our Lady of the Presentation, Catholic Church) in Eugene, Oregon, United States, was established in 1887. It is part of the Roman Catholic Archdiocese of Portland in Oregon.

== Background and history ==
Although Catholic missionaries first arrived in the upper Willamette Valley in the 1850s, St. Mary Parish was officially established in 1887, when Fr. Francis Beck became the first resident pastor. The first regularly scheduled Masses were said in a church bought from the Methodists and moved to 11th & Willamette. The Church's official title was "Church of the Purification of the Blessed Virgin Mary." A four-room school was established and built alongside the church in 1889.

The second St. Mary church building was built specifically for the parish at 11th & Willamette during the pastorship of Fr. James O'Farrell. It was dedicated on March 24, 1907.

Around 1920, the bulk of St. Mary's present city block was purchased, the old church was moved from 11th & Willamette to the 11th & Lincoln corner of the block, and the old four-room school was moved to the Lincoln Street side of the block and expanded. Fr. Edwin O'Hara was the pastor during this time.

== Current building ==
On February 2, 1927 (the Feast of the Presentation of the Lord also known as Candlemas day), ground was broken for the present St. Mary Catholic Church. It was completed and dedicated on October 12 of that same year. The church was "built in modified Gothic style so prevalent in American Catholic churches of the time, this Church was designed by Joseph Jacobberger, a Portland Architect." Windows from the old church building were incorporated into the walls of the new north and south transepts. The main altar was built in Italy "using Botticini marble and reredos of red Verona marble." Originally, a large crucifix was mounted above the altar and backed by a dark blue and gold brocade drape. Since then the main altar was moved to the right side of the Church, and the wall behind the altar was painted gold. The original altar rail and baptismal gates had been crafted by hand; however, these were removed. The 1,398-pipe organ still in use today, was built and installed by the Reuter Organ Company.

The building and grounds of St. Mary Church have undergone many changes throughout the years. During recent building, renovation, and restoration on the block, special attention has been given to recognizing and working within the style and tradition of the main church. In addition to the sanctuary, the block now houses an Adoration Chapel, Shrine of Our Lady of Guadalupe, Parish Hall, Teen Center (formerly the Auxiliary Hall), offices, conference rooms, library, classrooms, nursery, and courtyards.

== Parish boundaries ==
A decree establishing the boundaries of the parish of St. Mary in the city of Eugene from the Most Reverend William Levada, Archbishop of Portland in Oregon, on July 1, 1994, states:

Beginning at the northeast corner of the parish where the I-5 bridge crosses the Willamette River, south on I-5 to 30th Avenue, west on 30th Avenue to Amazon Parkway, north to 29th Avenue continuing west to Lorane Highway, southwest on Lorane Highway to the section line one section north of the line between Township 18 & 19, west to range line between 5 & 4 west, north to Highway 126, east on Highway 126 to Seneca Road, north on Seneca Road to the Coos Bay line of the Southern Pacific Railroad, east on the Coos Bay southern Pacific Railroad line to its junction with the mainline of the Southern Pacific Railroad, east on Cross Street to North Polk to the Willamette River and east on the Willamette River to the I-5 bridge.

These boundaries exclude St. Thomas More Parish (University of Oregon campus).

== School ==
St. Mary Catholic Church has a school named O'Hara Catholic School. It is a pre-school through 8th-grade school. It was founded in 1889 as the parish school for St. Mary in downtown Eugene. The school later became closely associated with the Sisters of the Holy Names who staffed the school for over 70 years, starting in 1916. In 1968, the campus moved to its larger and present location (formerly St. Francis High School) on West 18th Avenue, and it was called St. Mary School. The school became the first area school in Oregon in 1971, serving multiple parishes. In 1978, the school's name was changed to reflect its diverse area of service and to honor Archbishop Edwin Vincent O'Hara. Archbishop O'Hara was instrumental in developing a strong focus on the mission of Catholic education. He was the first Superintendent of Catholic Schools of Oregon and the sponsor of the first Catholic high school in Eugene. The pastor of St. Mary Catholic Church is the pastor of the school; however, O'Hara school serves like an area school serving several parishes in the area, including: St. Jude, St. Peter, St. Mark, St. Thomas More Newman Center, St. Alice, St. Helen, St. Catherine of Siena, and St. Henry.

== Shaping Eugene ==
In addition to purchasing and converting the Methodist church to a Catholic church and moving it to 11th and Willamette Street, Fr. Francis S. Beck (pastor from 1887 to 1894) saw the need to establish a school. He arranged for some Benedictine Sisters from Mt. Angel to run a school in Eugene from a "four-room building which faced Willamette Street." The sisters arrived in 1889. The school was called the "Academy of Our Lady of Victory." Later in 1895, the Sisters of Mercy took over for the school.

In addition to establishing the parish Church and School, Fr. Beck purchased the land for a cemetery in 1889; this became present-day Mt. Calvary Cemetery.

During Fr. John A. Moran's time as pastor (from 1911 to 1920), the Sisters of Mercy took over the Eugene General Hospital in College Hill, Oregon in 1912. It became "known as Mercy Hospital [and in addition] they opened a nurses training school." Consequently, Fr. Moran arranged to have six Sisters of the Holy Names come to run the school in 1916.

In 1919, Fr. Moran had purchased the property in the West 11th block between Charnelton and Lincoln streets. Later, Fr. Edwin V. O'Hara (pastor from 1920 to 1929) would convert the two-story building at 727 West 11th (now an eye clinic) to the rectory. The Holy Names Sisters were moved in 1921 to the house at 1116 Charnelton St. which is presently part of the Poole-Larsen Funeral Chapel. The Church and school buildings were moved to the northeast corner of 11th and Lincoln.

In 1921, the State Superintendent of schools, J. A. Churchill, would accept St. Mary as a 'standard school' by the State of Oregon.

in 1922 there was a serious threat to Catholic Education. "The Oregon School Bill of 1922 [attempted] to force all children to attend public school." Fr. O'Hara was drawn deeply into the fight to have this law declared unconstitutional. His cause came to a successful conclusion in the Supreme Court decision of March 17, 1925.

Father Edmund Murnane (pastor from 1950 to 1969) became convinced that St. Mary Parish was too large and should be divided into more than one parish. Money that has been collected in a capital campaign in 1952 was used. "A ten-acre tract in the River Road District and a twenty-six-acre tract in the Washington School District became the sites for St. Peter and St. Paul parishes respectively." A second campaign was begun in 1954 to raise $240,000 to begin building on these properties.

During this time an eight-classroom addition to St. Francis High School was built on the property on 18th and Jefferson Street which would eventually become O'Hara Catholic School.

It became apparent that more parishes were needed. St. Mark Catholic Church was carved out of the original St. Mary parish in the Bethel-Danebo district. It was started in 1961, and it was originally named St. Ansgar. The site was purchased in 1956, and the first Mass was scheduled to be celebrated on September 15, 1961; unfortunately, a fire burned the parish hall to the ground. Thankfully, insurance was able to cover most of the cost to rebuild. Masses were celebrated in a public school until the new hall could be built. Upon completion, it was "blessed by Archbishop Howard in 1963."

At the encouragement of Fr. Murnane, the construction of the Newman Student Center (with a chapel) on Emerald Street south of 18th Avenue was begun in 1965. "Given the name St. Thomas More, this parish has no boundaries since its prime purpose is to serve the faculty and students of the university."

Fr. Murnane foresaw the growing needs in the south hills of Eugene so he purchased land in that area which would later become St. Jude parish which was built in 1972.

Always with a vision for the future, as pastor of the St. Mary Parish, Fr. Murnane purchased a 28-acre tract of land in north Eugene and "in 1965 he began negotiations with the Marist Brothers of Poughkeepsie, New York, to administer and staff" a new high school together with Sisters of the Holy Names and lay teachers. Ground was not broken until May 1967, and Marist High School opened its doors on Sept. 9, 1968.

Fr. Murnane also saw a need for a contemplative community in the parish. "He negotiated with the nuns of the Carmel of St. Therese in Alhambra, California, to establish a monastery." A house was purchased on Greenhill Drive west of Eugene and seven Carmelite nuns arrived on November 4, 1957, to begin the Carmel of Maria Regina monastery, which still exists today as a contemplative presence in Eugene.

=== Social concerns ===
In 1927, Fr. O'Hara brought two Corpus Christi sisters to Eugene to do social work. That same year, he organized a unit of St. Vincent de Paul Society in St. Mary Parish.

Shortly after Fr. Murnane came to Eugene, he established the Catholic Charities of Lane County. The offices were in the rectory of St. Mary Church. Frank Nearing became the director. He also reorganized the St. Vincent de Paul Society and hired Harold C. McDonald to be its executive director. In 1966, Fr. Murnane started a home for unwed mothers "of all creeds and races."

== Pastors and administrators ==
- Rev. Francis Beck, pastor from Aug. 1887 – Jan. 1894.
- Rev. Martin Stravens, pastor from Jan. 1894 – 1895.
- Rev. James H. Black, pastor from Aug. 1895 – May. 1897.
- Rev. William A. Daly, pastor from June 1897 – 1898.
- Rev. Ladislaus Pryzbylski, pastor from 1898 – Aug. 1901.
- Rev. Peter Beutgen, pastor from Oct. 1901 – Mar. 1904.
- Rev. A. Reidhaar, pastor from Apr. 1904 – Feb. 1906.
- Rev. Joseph O. Farrell, pastor from Feb. 1906 – Aug. 1911.
- Rev. John A. Moran, pastor from Sept. 1911 – May 1920.
- Rev. Edwin V. O'Hara, pastor from Jun. 1920 – Jan. 1929.
- Rev. Francis P. Leipzig, pastor from Jan. 1929 – Sept. 1950.
- Rev. Edmund J. Murnane, pastor from Oct. of 1950 – June. 1969.
- Rev. Emil H. Kies, pastor from July 1969 – July 1987.
- Rev. Scott Vandehey, pastor from July 1987 – June 1999.
- Rev. Mark Bachmeier, pastor from July 1999 – June 2011.
- Rev. Liam Cary, pastor from July 2011 – Apr. 2012.
- Rev. Bryce McProud, interim administrator from May 2012 – June 2012.
- Rev. Ronald Nelson, pastor from July 2012 to June 2026.
- Rev. Amir Irudayaraj, SDB, pastor from July 2026 to present.
