= Edwin Vincent O'Hara =

American prelate

His Excellency, The Most Reverend Edwin Vincent O'Hara
- Archbishop (personal title); Bishop of Kansas City
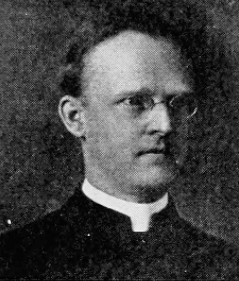
- Church: Roman Catholic Church
- See: Diocese of Kansas City
- Predecessor: Thomas Francis Lillis
- Successor: John Patrick Cody
- Other post: Bishop of Great Falls

Orders
- Ordination: June 9, 1905 by John Ireland
- Consecration: October 28, 1930 by Edward Howard

Personal details
- Born: September 6, 1881 Lanesboro, Minnesota, US
- Died: September 11, 1956 (aged 75) Milan, Italy
- Education: College of St. Thomas; Catholic University of America
- Motto: Sinite parvulos venire (Let the little children come)

Styles of Edwin O'Hara
- Reference style: The Most Reverend
- Spoken style: Your Excellency
- Religious style: Monsignor

Edwin Vincent O'Hara (September 6, 1881 – September 11, 1956) was an American prelate of the Roman Catholic Church. He served as bishop of the Diocese of Great Falls in Montana from 1930 to 1939 and bishop of the Diocese of Kansas City in Missouri from 1939 to 1956. He received the title of personal archbishop in 1954.

== Biography ==
=== Early life ===
Edwin O'Hara was born on September 6, 1881, in Lanesboro, Minnesota, the youngest of Owen and Margaret O'Hara's eight children. His parents had emigrated from Ireland during the Great Famine. He attended a one-room school on land donated by his father and later, graduated from Lanesboro High School. In 1897, O'Hara began studies at the College of St. Thomas in St. Paul, Minnesota. O'Hara entered St. Paul's Seminary in 1900, before moving to Oregon City, Oregon.

=== Priesthood ===
O'Hara was ordained to the priesthood in St. Paul on June 9, 1905, for the Diocese of Oregon City by Archbishop John Ireland. O'Hara began teaching scripture and apologetics at St. Mary's Academy in Portland, Oregon. In 1907, he founded the Catholic Education Association of Oregon, and served as the superintendent of schools for the diocese. He formed the Dante Club at the Portland Public Library, where he gave lectures on history and the classics. In the face of considerable anti-Catholic bias, O'Hara sought to make Catholicism more visible among non-Catholics in order to dispel inaccurate notions of Catholics beliefs.

In 1910, O'Hara became sick with bronchitis. Ordered by Archbishop Alexander Christie to take a rest, he traveled to Europe for six weeks with his sister Anna. Upon his return to the United States, he spent a semester taking classes at the Catholic University of America in Washington, D.C. He returned to Portland in 1911.

O'Hara served as a chaplain to the American armed forces during World War I. After the war, O'Hara performed pastoral work in the Archdiocese of Portland in Oregon In 1923, he became founder and director of the National Catholic Rural Life Conference, inspired by his ministry to those who lived in sparsely populated areas. According to him, "The Church is the biggest single factor in building up rural communities."

=== Bishop of Great Falls ===
On August 6, 1930, O'Hara was appointed the second bishop of Great Falls by Pope Pius XI. He received his episcopal consecration at the St. Mary's Cathedral of the Immaculate Conception in Portland on October 28, 1930, from Archbishop Edward Howard, with Bishops Charles White and Joseph Crimont serving as co-consecrators. In 1931, he was the only American bishop present in Rome when Pius XI delivered his encyclical Quadragesimo anno, and spoke for the United States as delegates from each nation reported the effects of Rerum novarum.

=== Bishop of Kansas City ===
O'Hara was named bishop of Kansas City in Missouri on April 15, 1939 by Pope Pius XII. Within his first ten years as bishop, the diocese built or bought 42 churches, 31 rectories, 24 colleges, high schools, and grade schools, 14 convents, eight social centers, and six hospitals. Of the 30 churches he constructed in rural counties, 25 of them had never had a Catholic church before.

O'Hara was considered to be theologically liberal, particularly in the fields of liturgy and social justice. A proponent of Catholic Action, he encouraged lay involvement and appointed laypeople to several top diocesan positions. Some believed he went too far in his promotion of the laity, leading even his own chancellor to resign in disapproval. O'Hara also led the effort to revise the Bible in simpler terms. On June 29, 1954, Pius XII granted him the personal title of archbishop of Kansas City. This was amended in 1958 to the personal title of archbishop of Kansas City–Joseph.

O'Hara died on September 11, 1956, in Milan, Italy, shortly after his 75th birthday. He is buried in Kansas City.

== Viewpoints ==
=== Existence of God ===
In 1940, O'Hara derided physicist Albert Einstein after the latter expressed his disbelief in a personal god, saying, "It is sad to see a man, who comes from the race of the Old Testament and its teaching, deny the great tradition of that race".

=== Social justice ===
Influenced by the views of Archbishop Ireland and Pope Leo XIII's encyclical Rerum novarum, O'Hara began to investigate the living conditions of factory workers in Portland. Based on his research, O'Hara published a book on the subject, which he then sent to public officials and newspapers. As a result, in 1913 the Oregon Legislative Assembly passed a minimum wage law. O'Hara was named chairman of the newly established Industrial Welfare Commission, which included both labor and management. The minimum wage law was subsequently challenged in court, but was upheld by both the Oregon Supreme Court, and on appeal to the U.S. Supreme Court in the case Stettler v. O'Hara.

== See also ==
- St. Mary Roman Catholic Church (Eugene, Oregon)
- O'Hara Catholic School

Catholic Church titles
| Preceded by Mathias Clement Lenihan | Bishop of Great Falls; 1930–1939 | Succeeded by William Joseph Condon |
| Preceded by Thomas Francis Lillis | Bishop of Kansas City; 1939–1956 | Succeeded by John Patrick Cody |
