= Cathedral of Our Lady of Lourdes (Spokane, Washington) =

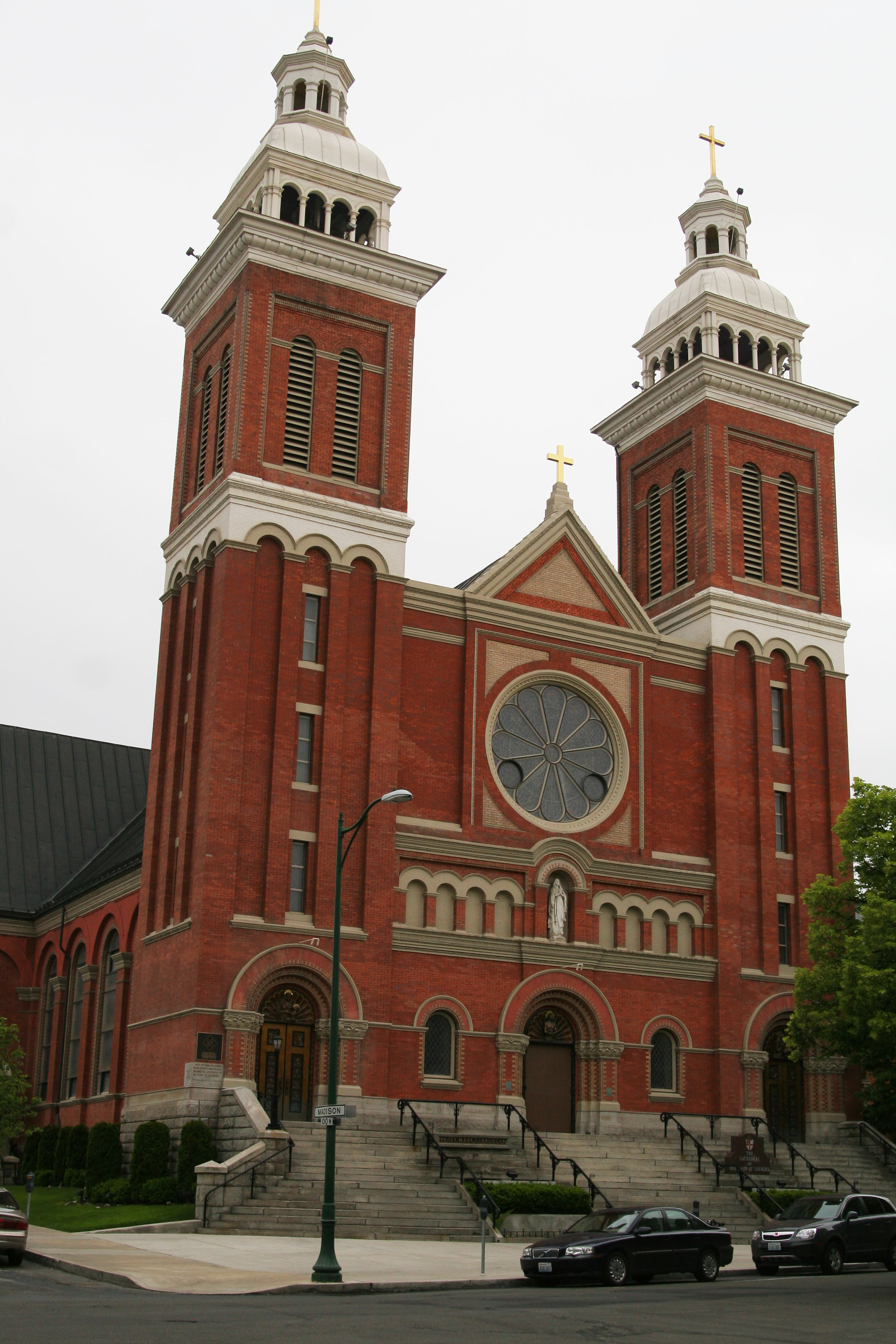

- Location in Washington
- 47°39′29″N 117°25′43″W
- Location: 1115 W. Riverside Ave. Spokane, Washington
- Country: United States
- Denomination: Catholic
- Website: https://spokanecathedral.com/

History
- Status: Cathedral
- Founded: 1881

Architecture
- Architect(s): Julian and Williams based on concept work by Preusse and Zittel
- Style: Romanesque Revival
- Completed: 1908

Specifications
- Materials: Brick

Administration
- Diocese: Spokane

Clergy
- Bishop: Most Rev. Thomas Daly
- Rector: Very Rev. Darrin Connall, VG
- Cathedral of Our Lady of Lourdes
- U.S. National Register of Historic Places
- U.S. Historic district – Contributing property
- Part of: Riverside Avenue Historic District
- NRHP reference No.: 76001921
- Added to NRHP: July 30, 1976

The Cathedral of Our Lady of Lourdes is a Catholic cathedral in Spokane, Washington, in the United States. It is the seat of the Diocese of Spokane.

== History ==
The Cathedral of Our Lady of Lourdes can trace its beginnings in 1881 to the first Mass in Spokane. It was celebrated by Joseph Cataldo, a Jesuit priest, in a converted carpenter's shop that he named St. Joseph Church. Five years later, the parish constructed a brick church and named it Our Lady of Lourdes. The Sisters of the Holy Names opened a parish school.

The parish laid the cornerstone for the present church building in 1903. A new school building was completed in 1906. On December 17, 1913, St. Pius X established the Diocese of Spokane and Our Lady of Lourdes was named the diocesan cathedral.

The cathedral was listed in 1976 on the National Register of Historic Places as a contributing property to the Riverside Avenue Historic District. The rectory building is a secondary contributing property to the district.

The diocese in 1991 completed a restoration of all the windows in the cathedral. Over 350 broken or cracked panes were replaced and all the windows were cleaned. Plastic sheets were installed on the exterior of many of the windows.During a renovation in 2019, the diocese covered the sanctuary in marble and installed a new marble altar and pews. The old high altar, topped by a Calvary scene, was relocated to the apse.A second restoration of the windows was undertaken in 2023 that removed the plastic sheets from the windows and re-leaded some of the stained glass sections.

During a Mass celebrated by Bishop Thomas Daly in February 2025, a man rushed into the sanctuary and punched the parochial vicar at the high altar. The assailant was quickly subdued by other worshippers and church security personnel, then turned over to police. No one was harmed during the incident.

In July 2025, the diocese began a $500,000 project to replace the staircase at the front entrance to the cathedral. The front entrance had been closed several months earlier after two parishioners nearly fell through the concrete.

== Architecture ==
The Cathedral of Our Lady of Lourdes was designed in an Italian Romanesque Revival style. The exterior is faced with red brick accented with granite. The facade is framed by two square towers that reach a height of 164 ft (50 m).

The bishop's cathedra, or throne, combines elements of the original 1913 throne of Bishop Augustine Francis Schinner, the marble cathedra from the 1930s and a new addition in 2018. The cathedral has one pipe organ in the loft, manufactured by the W. W. Kimball Company of Chicago, Illinois. The stained glass windows are from Bavaria in Germany.

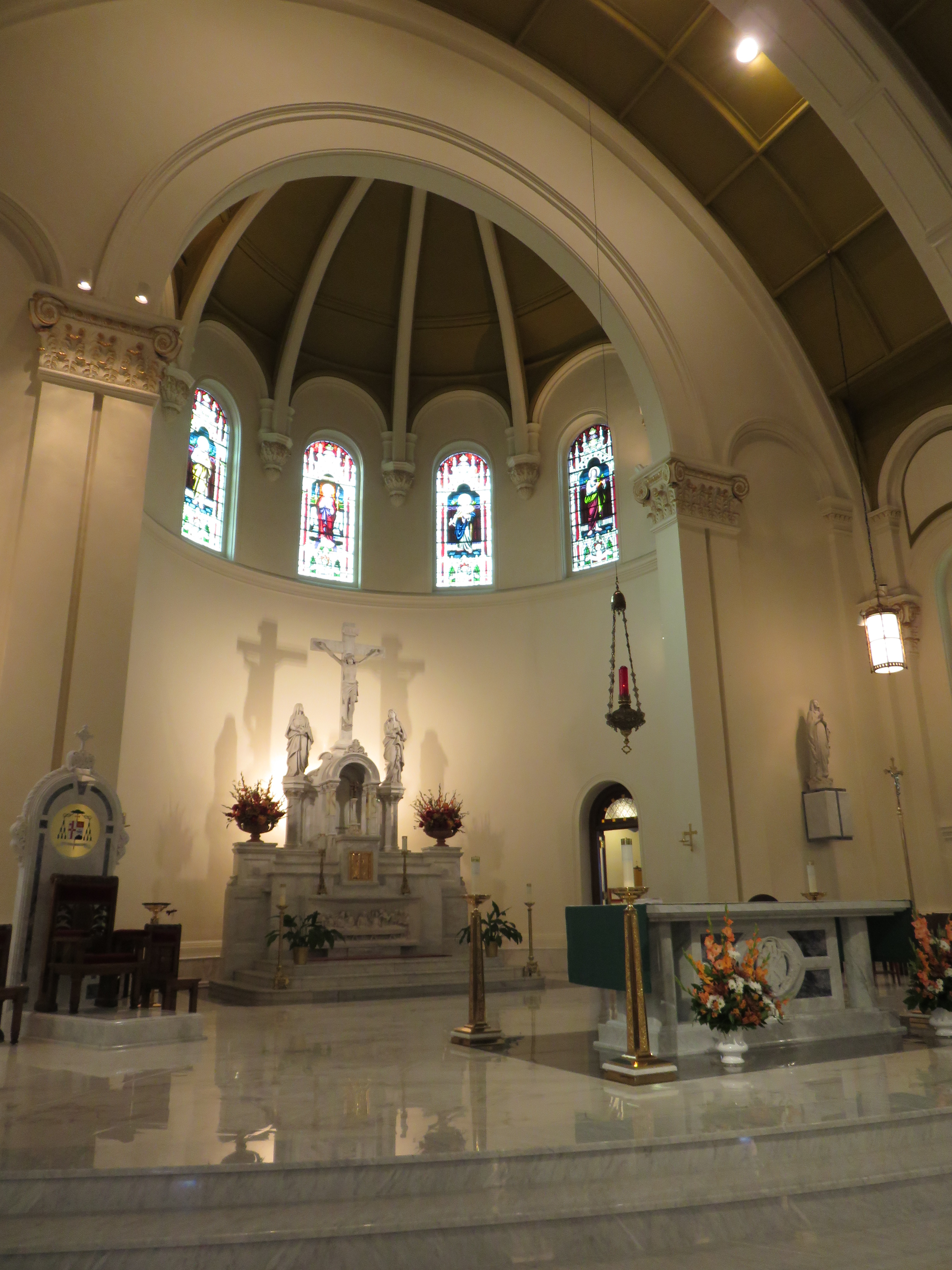
High altar (2018)

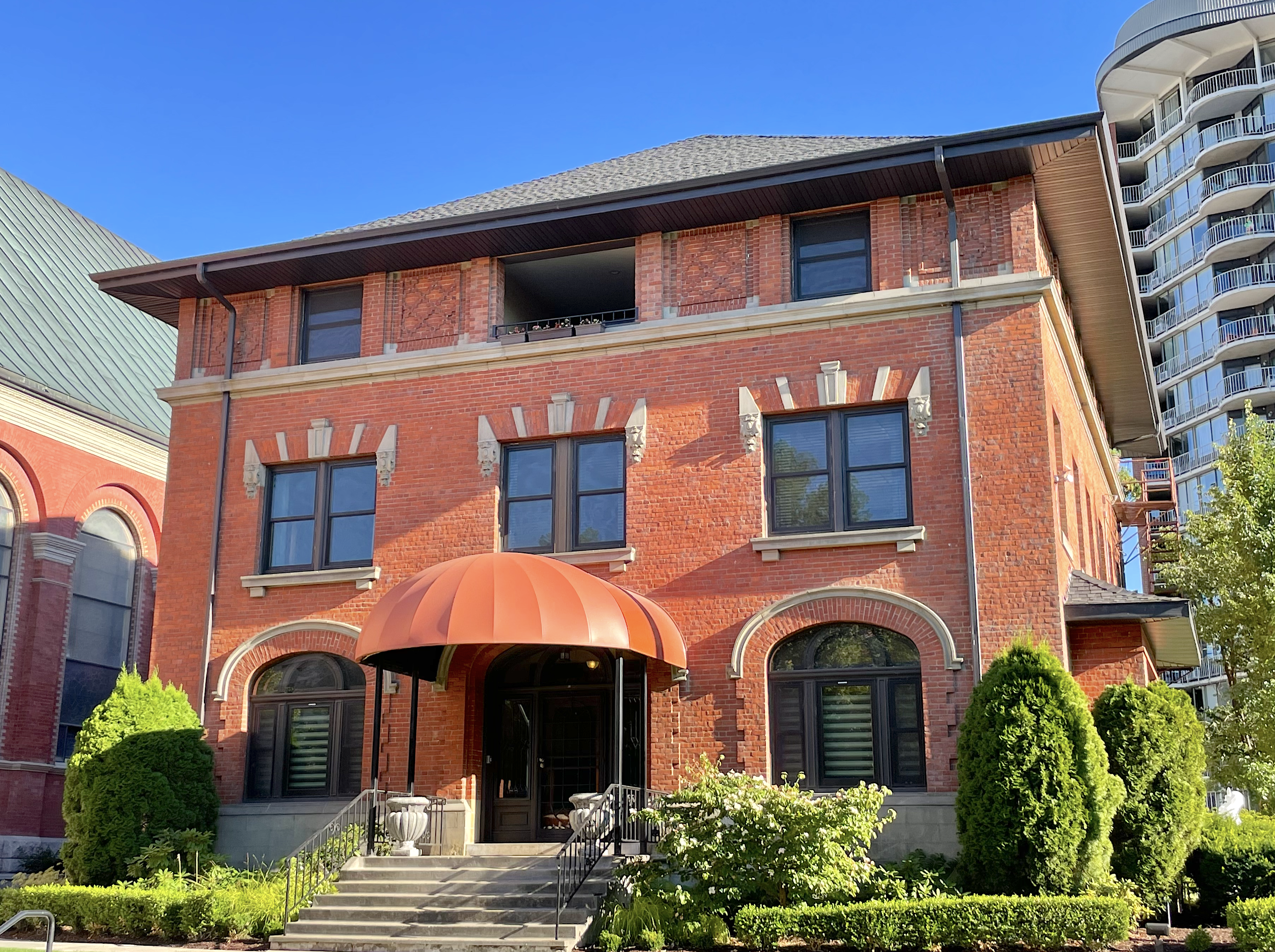
Rectory (2022)

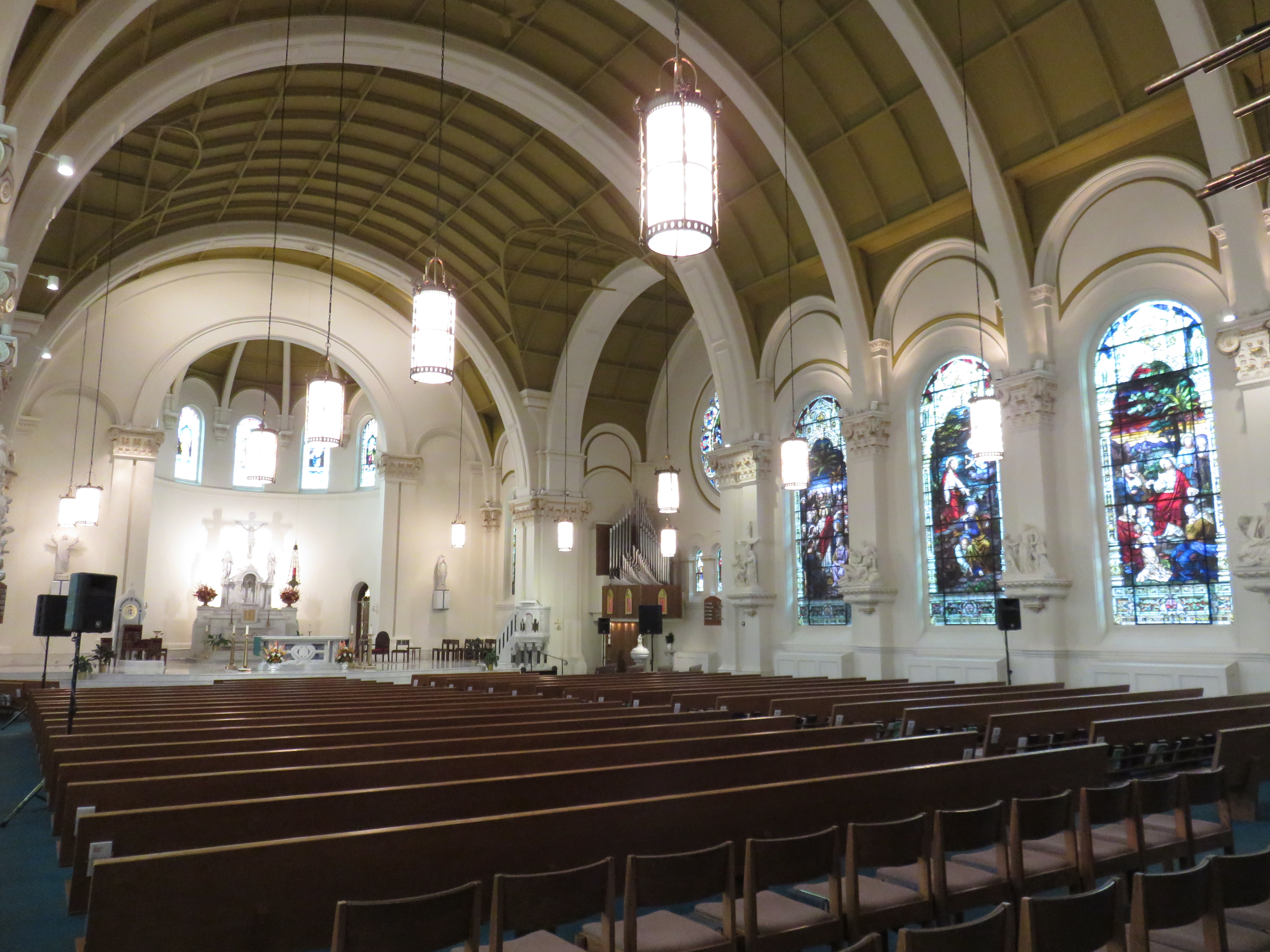
Nave (2018)

== See also ==
- List of Catholic cathedrals in the United States
- List of cathedrals in the United States
