= Roman Catholic Diocese of Spokane =

Latin Catholic ecclesiastical jurisdiction in Washington, USA

Coordinates: 47°39′32″N 117°25′30″W

Diocese of Spokane Dioecesis Spokanensis
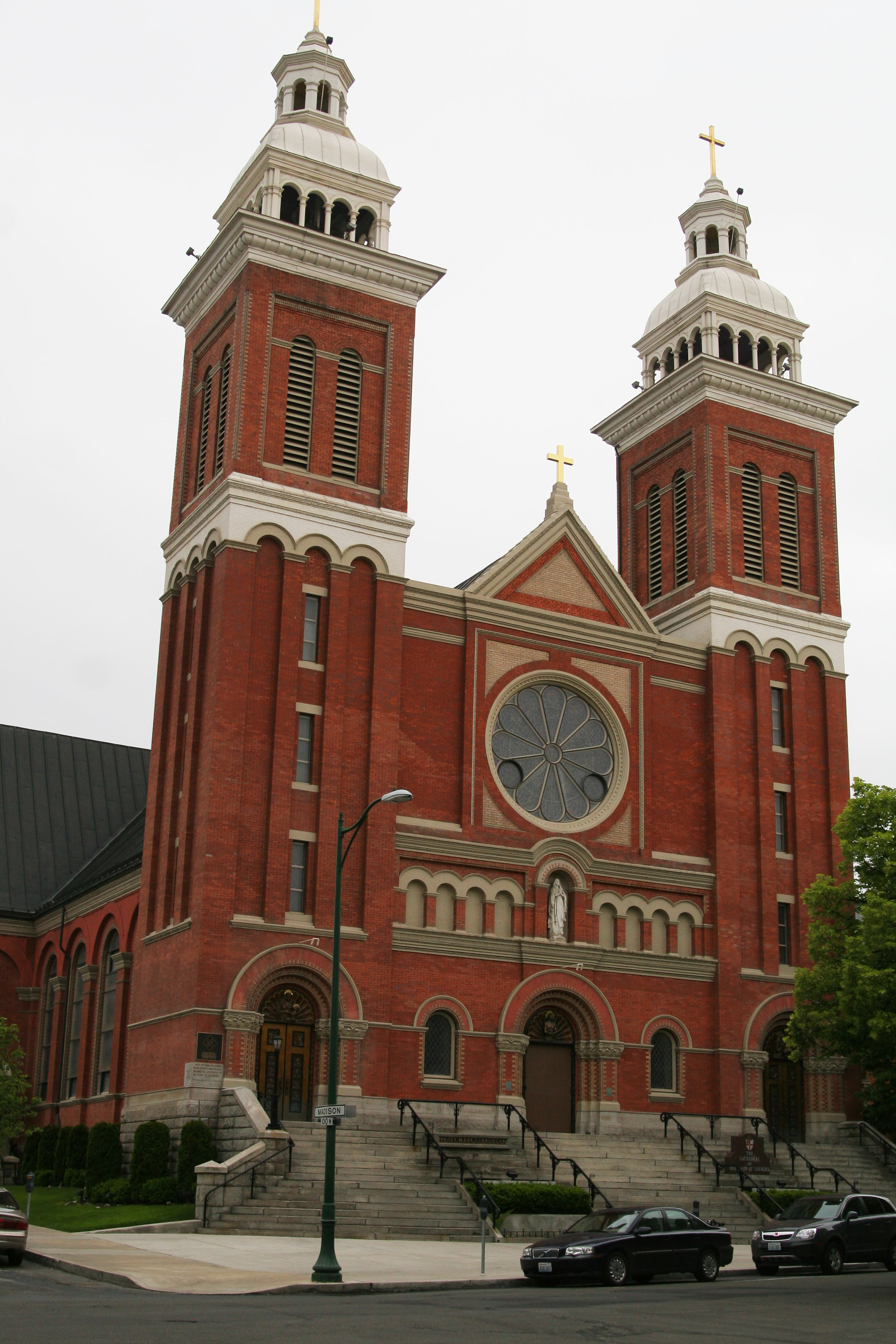
- Cathedral of Our Lady of Lourdes

- Coat of arms

Location
- Country: United States
- Territory: Northern and Eastern Washington State
- Ecclesiastical province: Province of Seattle
- Population: 103,000 (13.0%)

Information
- Denomination: Catholic
- Sui iuris church: Latin Church
- Rite: Roman Rite
- Established: December 17, 1913
- Cathedral: Cathedral of Our Lady of Lourdes
- Patron saint: Our Lady of Lourdes

Current leadership
- Pope: Leo XIV
- Bishop: Thomas Anthony Daly
- Metropolitan Archbishop: Paul Etienne
- Bishops emeritus: William S. Skylstad

Map
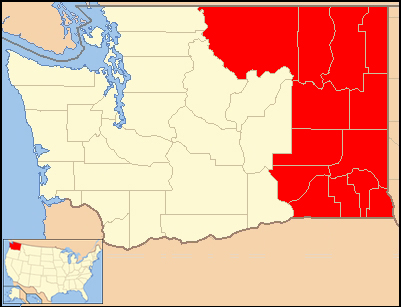

Website
- dioceseofspokane.org

The Diocese of Spokane (Latin: Dioecesis Spokanensis) is a diocese of the Catholic Church in Washington State in the United States. Erected in 1913, it is a suffragan diocese of the Archdiocese of Seattle. The mother church is the Cathedral of Our Lady of Lourdes in Spokane. The bishop is Thomas Daly.

== Territory ==
The Diocese of Spokane encompasses the following counties: Okanogan, Ferry, Stevens, Pend Oreille, Lincoln, Spokane, Adams, Whitman, Franklin, Walla Walla, Columbia, Garfield and Asotin.

As of 2025, approximately 85,000 Catholics were served by the diocese in 80 parishes.

== History ==
=== 1830 to 1880 ===
The Catholic Church presence in the present-day state of Washington dates to the 1830s. At that time, missionary priests traveled from the British Province of Quebec to minister to Catholics in present-day Oregon, Washington State and British Columbia.

In 1843, the Holy See established the Vicariate Apostolic of the Oregon Territory, which covered a huge swath of territory from California to Alaska. In 1846, Pope Gregory XVI divided the vicariate into three dioceses, with the Washington area part of the new Diocese of Walla Walla.

In 1847, dissident Cayuse tribesman killed 11 Protestant missionaries and kidnapped others in southeastern Washington in what became known as the Whitman massacre. It was followed that same year by the Cayuse War, lasting several years between the tribe and the territorial government of Oregon. As the result of these conflicts, the Vatican abandoned the Diocese of Walla Walla in 1850, shifting jurisdiction of the areas to the Diocese of Oregon City. Later that year, Pope Pius IX suppressed the Diocese of Walla Walla and erected the Diocese of Nesqually to replace it. In 1859, the church reestablished itself in Walla Walla, opening St. Patrick's Parish.

=== 1880 to 1913 ===
In 1881, the Church of St. Joseph was started in a converted carpenter's shop, the first Catholic church in Spokane. The Sisters of Providence started Sacred Heart Hospital in Spokane in 1886; it is today Providence Sacred Heart Medical Center. Gonzaga University was opened by 1887 by the missionary Joseph Cataldo in Spokane. In 1898, the Sisters of Providence opened the Sacred Heart School of Nursing in Spokane. The Sisters of the Immaculate Heart of Mary opened the St. Joseph School in Spokane in 1905.

In 1907, the Vatican suppressed the Diocese of Nesqually, replacing it with the Diocese of Seattle, covering all of what was now Washington State.

=== 1913 to 1950 ===
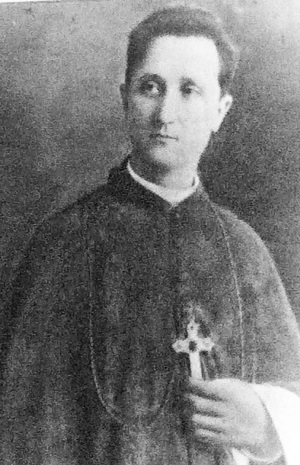
Bishop Schinner (1905)

The Diocese of Spokane was erected by Pope Pius X on December 17, 1913, its territory taken from the Diocese of Seattle. While the canonical decree was signed in December 1913, the news was publicly broken by The Catholic Bulletin in the Diocese of Saint Paul on February 7, 1914.

The pope named Bishop Augustine Schinner from the Diocese of Superior as the first bishop of Spokane. Schinner retired in 1925.

The second bishop of Spokane was Monsignor Charles White from the Diocese of Grand Rapids, named by Pope Pius XI in 1927. The Franciscan Sisters of Perpetual Adoration started the St. Anthony School in 1928. The same order opened Marycliff High School for Girls in Spokane in 1929.

During his 28-year tenure, White built Sacred Heart School and convent, the Sisters of the Good Shepherd Home in Spokane, St. Charles Parish in Spokane, St. Joseph Parish in Trentwood, and St. John Vianney Parish in Spokane. In other areas of the diocese, White built the Grand Coulee Dam Parish in Grand Coulee and the nurses' home and school in Colfax. For Native Americans, he established St. Gertrude Parish in Monse and St. Jude in Usk. He also established the Confraternity of Christian Doctrine and the National Catholic Rural Life Conference in the diocese.

In 1938, the Dominican Sisters of Washington opened St. Martin's Hospital in Tonasket. It is today the North Valley Hospital District.

=== 1950 to 2015 ===
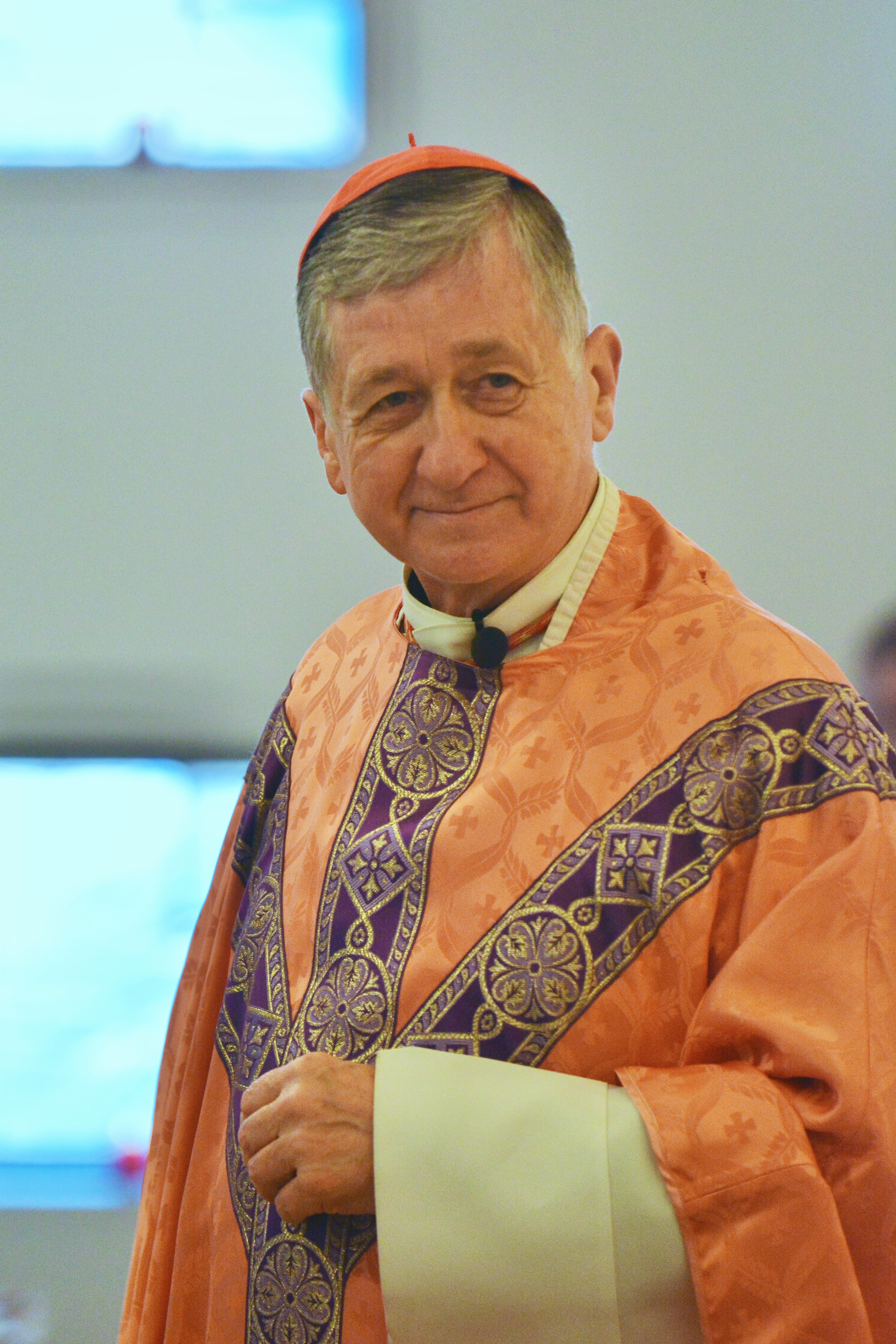
Cardinal Cupich (2021)

In 1951, Pope Pius XII erected the Diocese of Yakima, taking territory from the Diocese of Spokane. In early 1955, Pius XII named Bernard Topel as coadjutor bishop to assist White. When White died later that year, Topel succeeded him as bishop.

During his 22-year tenure, Topel established several parishes and schools, maternity homes and housing for the elderly.In 1956, Topel opened the Bishop White Seminary at Gonzaga University. Topel in 1967 established the Immaculate Heart Retreat House in Spokane. Mater Cleri, a high school seminary, was inaugurated in Colbert in 1962. The Sisters of Providence in 1964 opened Holy Family Hospital in North Spokane. It is today Providence Holy Family Hospital.

Topel retired in 1978. Lawrence Welsh replaced Topel in 1978. In 1990, shortly after Welsh was arrested in Spokane for driving under the influence of alcohol, he resigned as bishop of Spokane.

John Paul II appointed Bishop William S. Skylstad of Yakima as the next bishop of Spokane in 1991. He retired in 2010. To replace Skylstad, Pope Benedict XVI selected Bishop Blase J. Cupich of the Diocese of Rapid City in 2010.

In 2011, Cupich discouraged priests and seminarians in his diocese from participating in demonstrations in front of Planned Parenthood clinics or supporting 40 Days for Life, an anti-abortion movement that conducts vigils at facilities that offered abortion services. Cupich later clarified his position through a statement that said that he would not forbid priests from praying outside the clinics. In 2012, Cupich supported the decision of Gonzaga University to invite Anglican Bishop Desmond Tutu to speak at its graduation ceremonies and receive an honorary degree. This was despite protests from the Cardinal Newman Society and others active in the anti-abortion movement. In 2014, Cupich became archbishop of the Archdiocese of Chicago.

=== 2015 to present ===
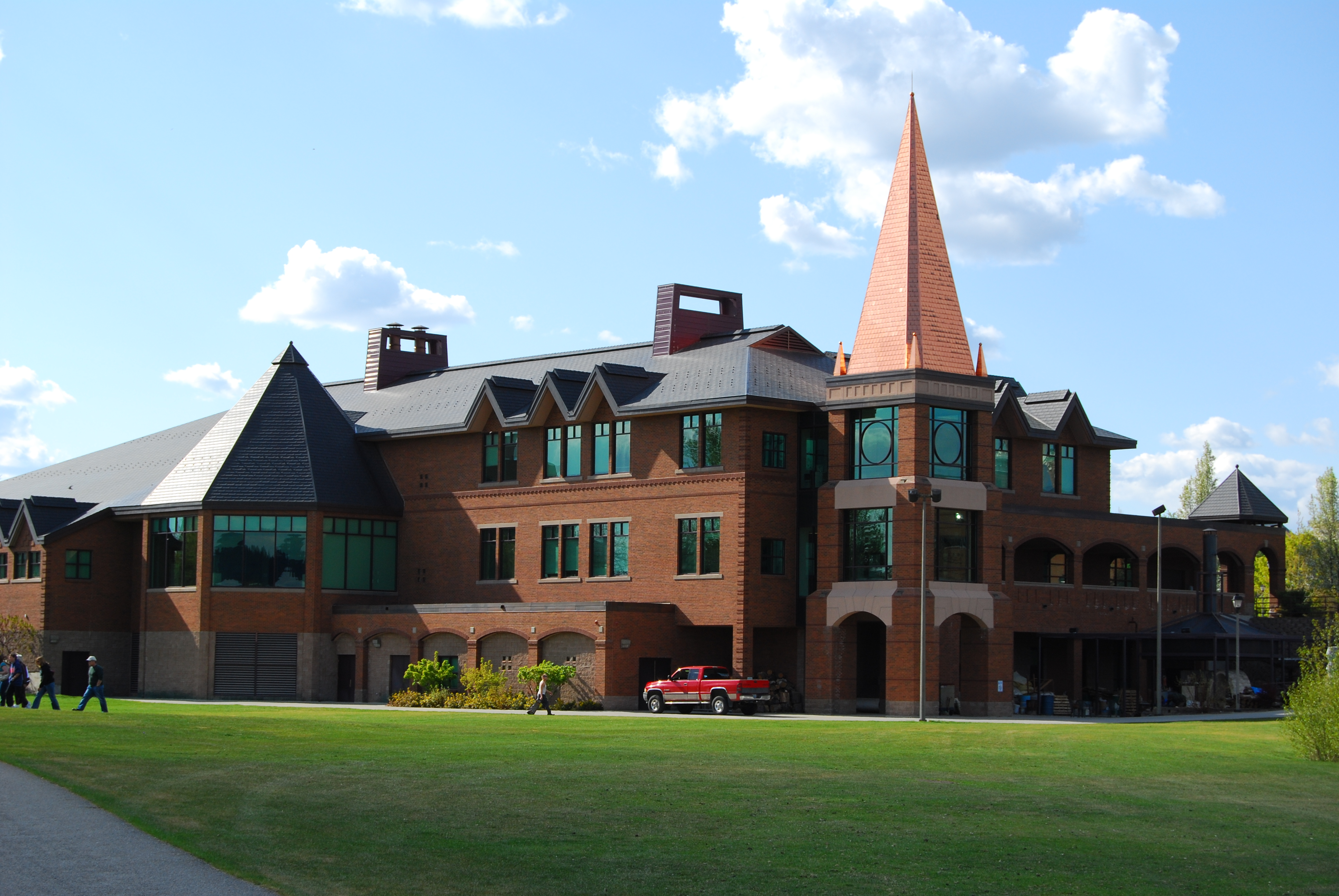
Gonzaga University, Spokane, Washington (2008)

In 2015, Pope Francis named Auxiliary Bishop Thomas Daly from the Diocese of San Jose as the next bishop of Spokane. In a February 19, 2020, statement, Daly wrote that he was concerned by the Gonzaga University School of Law's establishment of an LGBTQ+ Rights Clinic without first consulting him. In his statement, Daly speculated that the clinic might bring the law school "into conflict with the religious freedom of Christian individuals and organizations." He also expressed fear that it "will be actively promoting, in the legal arena and on campus, values that are contrary to the Catholic faith and Natural Law."

Daly met with Rob McCann, the head of Catholic Charities of Eastern Washington who in 2020 had posted a video endorsing the Black Lives Matter movement, and then posted a statement disapproving of McCann's statements along with the violence at some George Floyd protests. Daly further stated that "BLM is in conflict with Church teaching regarding marriage, family and the sanctity of life."

In November 2020, Sacred Heart Catholic Church and New Testament Baptist Church in Brewster suffered damage from arson attacks. The damage to Sacred Heart was minor, but New Testament was damaged beyond repair. A suspect in both crimes was arrested in March 2022. In February 2025, Daly urged voters in Washington State to contact the state legislature to oppose a bill requiring clergy to report sexual abuse of children, even if knowledge of the crime is gained during confession. After a lawsuit against Washington State by the US Department of Justice, the state agreed not to require disclosure of evidence gained during confession.

=== Sex abuse and bankruptcy ===
In December 2004, the Diocese of Spokane declared Chapter 11 Bankruptcy to manage the claims of people credibly abused by its priests. As part of its bankruptcy agreement, the diocese agreed to pay at least $48 million to the victims as compensation. The money for the settlement was to come from insurance companies, the sale of church property, contributions from Catholic groups and from the diocese's parishes.

== Bishops ==
=== Bishops of Spokane ===
1. Augustine Francis Schinner (1914–1925)
2. Charles Daniel White (1926–1955)
3. Bernard Joseph Topel (1955–1978)
4. Lawrence Welsh (1978–1990), resigned; later appointed Auxiliary Bishop of Saint Paul and Minneapolis in 1991
5. William S. Skylstad (1990–2010)
6. Blase J. Cupich (2010–2014), appointed Archbishop of Chicago (Cardinal in 2016)
7. Thomas Anthony Daly (2015–present)

=== Other priests of this diocese who became bishop ===
- William Joseph Condon, appointed Bishop of Great Falls in 1939
- Walter James Fitzgerald, consecrated bishop, February 24, 1939; appointed Vicar Apostolic of Alaska, May 20, 1945

== Education ==
=== High schools ===
As of 2025, there are four high schools in the Diocese of Spokane:

- Chesterton Academy of Notre Dame – Spokane
- Desales High School – Walla Walla
- Gonzaga Prep – Spokane
- Tri-Cities Prep – Pasco

=== College ===
- Gonzaga University – Spokane

== Province ==
See: List of the Catholic bishops of the United States#Province of Seattle
