= Charles Daniel White =

American prelate

His Excellency, The Most Reverend Charles Daniel White
- Bishop of Spokane
- Church: Roman Catholic Church
- See: Diocese of Spokane
- In office: February 24, 1927 to September 25, 1955
- Predecessor: Augustine Francis Schinner
- Successor: Bernard Joseph Topel

Orders
- Ordination: September 24, 1910 by Pietro Respighi
- Consecration: February 24, 1927 by Joseph G. Pinten

Personal details
- Born: January 5, 1879 Grand Rapids, Michigan, US
- Died: September 25, 1955 (aged 76)
- Education: St. Francis Seminary; Urban College of Propaganda
- Motto: Orationi et ministerio verbi (To prayer and the ministry of the word)

Charles Daniel White (January 5, 1879 – September 25, 1955) was an American prelate of the Roman Catholic Church. He served as a bishop of the Diocese of Spokane in Washington State from 1927 until his death in 1955.

== Biography ==
=== Early life ===
Charles White was born on January 5, 1879, in Grand Rapids, Michigan, to Patrick and Catherine (née Bolger) White. He attended St. Francis de Sales Seminary in St. Francis, Wisconsin, then completed his studies at the Urban College of Propaganda in Rome. He earned a Ph.D. (1907) and Doctor of Sacred Theology degree (1911).

=== Priesthood ===
White was ordained to the priesthood for the Diocese of Grand Rapids in Rome by Cardinal Pietro Respighi on September 24, 1910. Returning to Michigan, he served as a professor (1911–1919) and rector (1919–1927) at St. Joseph Preparatory Seminary in Grand Rapids. White also served as a curate at St. Andrew's Cathedral in Grand Rapids (1911–1918). The Vatican named White as a domestic prelate in 1925.

=== Bishop of Spokane ===
On December 20, 1926, White was appointed the second bishop of Spokane by Pope Pius XI. He received his episcopal consecration on February 24, 1927, from Bishop Joseph G. Pinten, with Bishops Samuel Stritch and Alphonse John Smith serving as co-consecrators. He was installed on March 10, 1927, at the Cathedral of Our Lady of Lourdes in Spokane.

During his 28-year tenure as bishop, he built St. Anthony School and convent, Sacred Heart School and convent, the Sisters of the Good Shepherd Home in Spokane, Marycliff High School for Girls in Spokane, St. Charles Parish, St. Joseph Parish in Trentwood, Washington, and St. John Vianney Parish in Spokane.

In other areas of the diocese, White built the Grand Coulee Dam Parish in Grand Coulee, Washington, the nurses' home and school in Colfax, Washington and Tonasket Hospital in Tonasket, Washington. For Native Americans, he established St. Gertrude Parish in Monse and St. Jude in Usk, Washington. He also established the Confraternity of Christian Doctrine and the National Catholic Rural Life Conference in the diocese.

Charles White died in Spokane on September 25, 1955, at age 76.

Catholic Church titles
Preceded by Augustine Francis Schinner	Bishop of Spokane; 1927–1955	Succeeded by Bernard Joseph Topel
