= Amblada =

Ancient city in Asia Minor Pisidia landscape in Turkey

Coordinates: 37°31′07″N 31°44′19″E

Amblada (Ancient Greek: Ἄμβλαδα) was a town of ancient Lycaonia or of Pisidia, inhabited in Hellenistic, Roman, and Byzantine times. It was the seat of a bishop; no longer a residential see, it remains a titular see of the Roman Catholic Church. Strabo places it in Pisidia; the bishopric was suffragan to the metropolitan of Lycaonia.

Ancient Greek authors described Ambladian wine as suitable for use in medicinal diets.

The coin minted copper coins during the period of the Antonines and their successors, with the epigraph Ἀμβλαδέων.

Its site is located near Hisartepe -, Seydişehir, Konya Province, Turkey.
