= Thomas Anthony Daly =

American Roman Catholic bishop

His Excellency, The Most Reverend Thomas Anthony Daly
- Bishop of Spokane
- Diocese: Spokane
- Appointed: March 12, 2015
- Installed: May 20, 2015
- Predecessor: Blase J. Cupich
- Previous post: Auxiliary Bishop of San José in California and Titular Bishop of Tabalta (2011-2015)

Orders
- Ordination: May 9, 1987 by John Raphael Quinn
- Consecration: May 25, 2011 by Patrick Joseph McGrath, George Hugh Niederauer, and George Leo Thomas

Personal details
- Born: April 30, 1960 (age 66) San Francisco, California
- Denomination: Roman Catholic
- Education: University of San Francisco (B.A., 1982); Saint Patrick Seminary (M.Div., 1987); Boston College (M.Ed., 1996).
- Motto: Into your hands Lord
- Coat of arms: Thomas Anthony Daly's coat of arms

Styles of Thomas Anthony Daly
- Reference style: His Excellency; The Most Reverend
- Spoken style: Your Excellency
- Religious style: Bishop

Ordination history of Thomas Anthony Daly
History
Episcopal consecration
- Principal consecrator: Patrick Joseph McGrath, Bishop of San Jose
- Co-consecrators: George Hugh Niederauer, George Leo Thomas

Thomas Anthony Daly (born April 30, 1960) is an American prelate of the Roman Catholic Church. He has been serving as bishop of the Diocese of Spokane in Washington State since May 20, 2015. He previously served as an auxiliary bishop of the Diocese of San José in California from 2011 to 2015.

== Biography ==
=== Early life ===
Thomas Daly was born on April 30, 1960, in San Francisco, California. After graduating from high school, Daly entered the University of San Francisco, where he received a Bachelor of Arts in 1982.

Having decided to become a priest, Daly enrolled in St. Patrick's Seminary and University in Menlo Park, California. In 1987, he received a Master of Divinity degree from St. Patrick.

=== Priesthood ===
Daly was ordained to the priesthood at the Cathedral of Saint Mary of the Assumption in San Francisco by Archbishop John Quinn for the Archdiocese of San Francisco on May 9, 1987. The archdiocese assigned Daly as parochial vicar of Our Lady of Loretto Parish in Novato, California, and as teacher and campus minister at Marin Catholic High School in Kentfield, California.

Daly left Our Lady of Loretto in 1992, but continued working at Marin High School for the next 11 years. Daly left Our Lady in 1992, Daly began serving in 1995 as part-time chaplain to the San Francisco Police Department and as pastor of Saint Cecilia Parish in San Francisco.

Daly traveled to Boston in 1995 to attend Boston College. He was awarded a Master of Education degree in 1997. After returning to San Francisco, was appointed to St. Vincent's in San Rafael and the Associate Director of the Catholic Youth Organization (CYO) and resumed his role at Marin Catholic High School. Archbishop William Levada named Daly as Vocations Director for the Archdiocese in 2002 and President of Marin Catholic High School in 2003.

=== Auxiliary Bishop of San Jose ===
Daly was named auxiliary bishop of San Jose and titular bishop of Tabalta by Pope Benedict XVI on March 16, 2011. He was consecrated bishop on May 25, 2011, at the Cathedral Basilica of Saint Joseph in San Jose by Bishop Patrick McGrath, with Archbishop George Niederauer and Bishop George Thomas acting as co-consecrators.

On September 16, 2013, Archbishop Salvatore Cordileone named Daly as the interim president/rector of the archdiocesan seminary. Daly was the first rector of the seminary who did not belong to Society of St. Sulpice.

=== Bishop of Spokane ===
On March 12, 2015, Daly was appointed by Pope Francis as bishop of Spokane. Daly was installed on May 20, 2015.

In March 2017, Daly banned Reverend Otto Koltzenburg, a retired priest, from participating in ministry, based on credible accusations that he sexually abused a 10-year-old altar boy between 1984 and 1986 in Spokane.

Daly has presided over a rapid increase in the number of diocesan seminarians.

In October 2025, Daly suspended Reverend Miguel Mejia, a priest of the diocese, from active ministry after the latter was accused of mishandling funds and engaging in sexual misconduct towards six women. Daly faced criticism, especially from Mejia's parishioners, for the unusual publicity he had given to the suspension and the evidence against Mejia.

== Viewpoints ==
=== Abortion rights ===
On February 4, 2019, Daly stated that American Catholic politicians who support abortion rights should be denied communion in the diocese until they are "reconciled to Christ and the Church".

=== Immigration ===
On January 30, 2017, Daly criticized the Trump administration ban on the admission of refugees from the Syrian Civil War into the United States.

=== LGBTQ+ ===
In a statement on February 19, 2020, Daly wrote that he was concerned by the Gonzaga University School of Law's establishment of an LGBTQ+ Rights Clinic without first consulting him. The clinic's stated aims are:

"...to advance the equal rights and dignity of individuals who identify as LGBTQ+ through education, programming, advocacy, research, and legal representation."

In his statement, Daly speculated that the clinic might bring the law school "into conflict with the religious freedom of Christian individuals and organizations," and expressed fear that it "will be actively promoting, in the legal arena and on campus, values that are contrary to the Catholic faith and Natural Law."

=== Racism ===
In June 2020, Dr. Rob McCann – the head of Catholic Charities of Eastern Washington – posted a video in which he endorsed the Black Lives Matter movement and described the Catholic Church as racist. In the video, McCann stated that "For me, as a White person, saying 'I'm not a racist' is like saying 'a fish is not wet'" and that "My Catholic Church and my Catholic Charities organization is racist... Our Catholic faith tradition was built on a tradition that a baby born in a manger in the Middle East was a White baby."

Daly responded to the video by meeting with McCann, and subsequently posting a statement explaining his disapproval of McCann's words. Daly also condemned the violence at some of the George Floyd protests and said that "BLM is in conflict with Church teaching regarding marriage, family and the sanctity of life." In the same statement, Daly decried the "horrific and unjustified" murder of George Floyd and outlined steps to be taken in conjunction with Catholic Charities towards addressing racism.

== See also ==
- Catholic Church hierarchy
- Catholic Church in the United States
- Historical list of the Catholic bishops of the United States
- List of Catholic bishops of the United States
- Lists of patriarchs, archbishops, and bishops

== Episcopal succession ==
Catholic Church titles
Preceded by Blase J. Cupich	Bishop of Spokane; 2015-Present	Succeeded by Incumbent
Preceded by -	Auxiliary Bishop of San Jose; 2011-2015	Succeeded by -
