= St. Ann's Cathedral (Great Falls, Montana) =

Historic church in Montana, United States

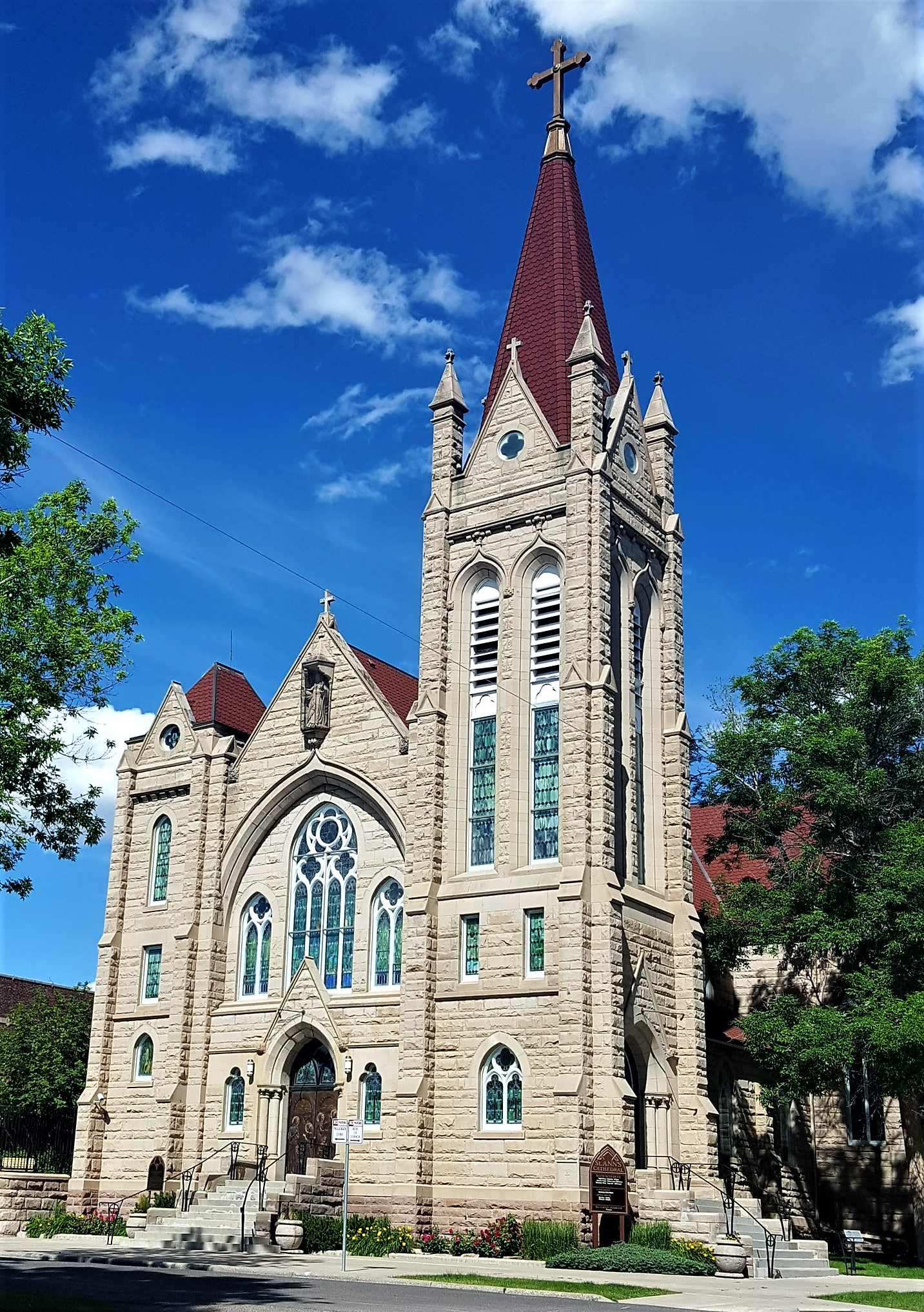
- St. Ann's Cathedral
- 47°30′32″N 111°17′43″W
- Location: 715 3rd Avenue N Great Falls, Montana
- Country: United States
- Denomination: Roman Catholic Church
- Website: www.stannscathedral.org

History
- Status: Cathedral
- Founded: 1889; 137 years ago

Architecture
- Architect: John H. Kent
- Style: Gothic Revival
- Completed: 1907; 119 years ago
- Construction cost: $100,000

Specifications
- Materials: Limestone

Administration
- Diocese: Great Falls-Billings

Clergy
- Bishop: Most Rev. Jeffrey M. Fleming
- Rector: Rev. Xavier Arimboor
- St. Ann's Cathedral
- U.S. Historic district – Contributing property
- Part of: Great Falls Northside Residential Historic District (ID91000355)
- Added to NRHP: April 1, 1991

St. Ann's Cathedral is a Catholic cathedral in Great Falls, Montana, United States. Along with St. Patrick's Co-Cathedral in Billings, Montana it is the seat of the Diocese of Great Falls-Billings. In 1991 it was included as a contributing property in the Great Falls Northside Residential Historic District on the National Register of Historic Places.

== History ==
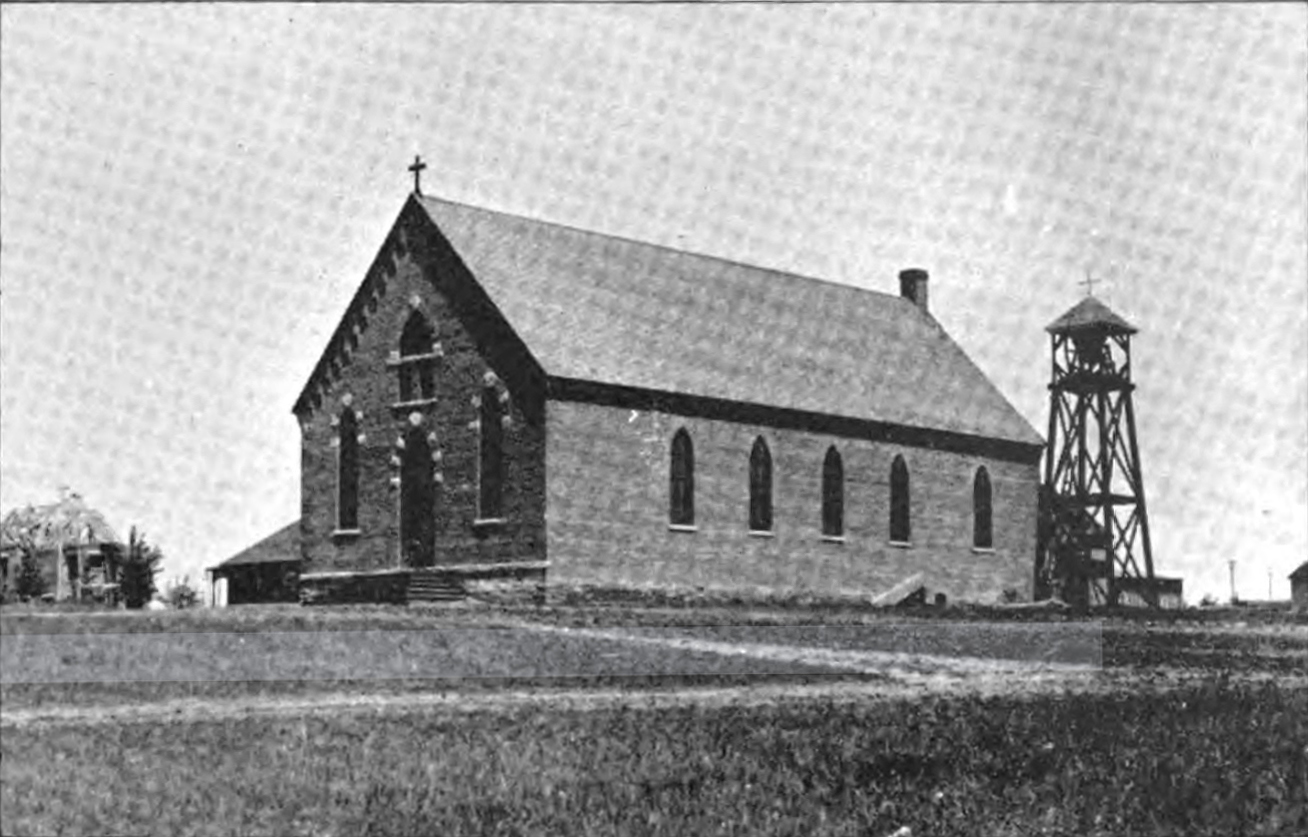
The original St. Ann's Church

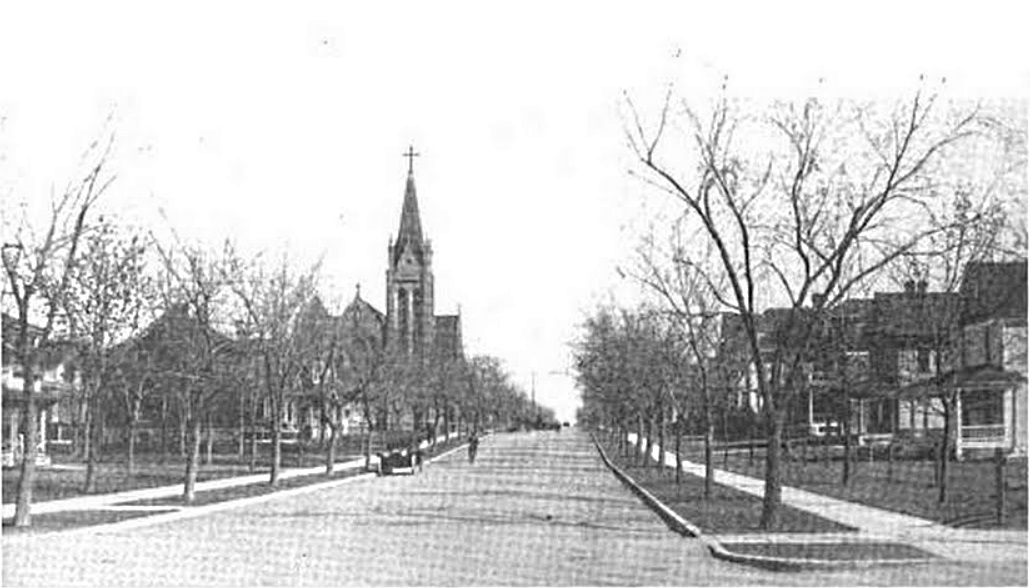
The cathedral and neighborhood in 1920

=== St. Ann's Parish ===
The first St. Ann's Church was financed by three parishioners who signed a note for $3,000. The church was built of brick on the site now occupied by the Heisey Center. The first resident pastor was Father Dols, who was also responsible for parishes in Cascade, Choteau, and Neihart.

=== St. Ann's Cathedral ===
On May 18, 1904, St. Pius X established the Diocese of Great Falls, and St. Ann's became the cathedral. One of the first tasks of the new bishop, Mathias Clement Lenihan, was to build a new cathedral to accommodate the growing congregation. Designed by John H. Kent of Helena, the present church was constructed between 1906 and 1907 for around $100,000 ($3,500,000 in 2025 dollars). It features a cruciform plan, Gothic arched windows, and a turreted bell tower. The stone for the Gothic Revival structure was quarried near Stockett. It is Great Falls' largest church. The former church building was remodeled for a parochial school.

The current rectory was built in 1931 and designed in a style similar to the cathedral. The old church was demolished, and the Heisey Youth Center want built on the site in 1936. It is also used as a parish center. The cathedral was extensively renovated in 1953 in anticipation of the diocese's Golden Jubilee the following year.

Pope John Paul II renamed the Great Falls Diocese the Diocese of Great Falls-Billings on February 14, 1980. At that time, St. Patrick's Church in Billings joined St. Ann's as the co-cathedral of the diocese.

=== Pipe organ ===
The Cathedral pipe organ was built by the Reuter Organ Co. of Lawrence, Kansas, in 1929 as their Opus 328. It consisted of 14-ranks in two divided chambers and was distributed over 3-manuals. In 1995, Meadway & Stettner Pipe Organs of Monroe, Washington, refurbished the organ, which included adding front expression shutters to both chambers, console upgrades, and tonal revision while still remaining at 14 ranks.

== See also ==
- List of Catholic cathedrals in the United States
- List of cathedrals in the United States
