= Jeffrey M. Fleming =

American Catholic bishop (born 1966)

His Excellency, The Most Reverend Jeffrey Michael Fleming
- Bishop of Great Falls-Billings
- Diocese: Great Falls-Billings
- Appointed: April 19, 2022 (as Coadjutor)
- Installed: August 22, 2023
- Previous posts: Chancellor, Diocese of Helena

Orders
- Ordination: May 19, 1992 by Elden Francis Curtiss
- Consecration: June 22, 2022 by Michael William Warfel, Alexander King Sample, and Austin Vetter

Personal details
- Born: February 10, 1966 (age 60) Billings, Montana, US
- Education: Carroll College; Mount Angel Seminary; Catholic University of America
- Motto: Go make disciples

Styles of Jeffrey Michael Fleming
- Reference style: His Excellency; The Most Reverend
- Spoken style: Your Excellency
- Religious style: Bishop

Jeffrey Michael Fleming (born February 10, 1966) is an American bishop of the Catholic Church and is the bishop of the Diocese of Great Falls-Billings in Montana. Fleming was named coadjutor in 2022 and bishop in 2023.

== Biography ==
=== Early life ===
Jeffrey Fleming was born in Billings, Montana, on February 10, 1966, to Mike and Glenda (née Gibson) Fleming, and raised in Belt, Montana, along with two sisters. Jeffrey Fleming received his sacraments of Confession, First Holy Communion and Confirmation at Saint Mark's Catholic Church in Belt.

Fleming obtained a Bachelor of Arts degree in theology and religious education at Carroll College in Helena, Montana, in 1988. He earned his Master of Theology degree at Mount Angel Seminary in Saint Benedict, Oregon, in 1992.

=== Priesthood ===
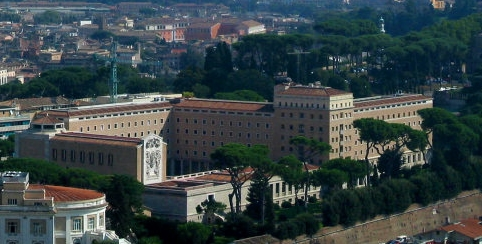
Pontifical North American College, Rome, Italy (2010)

Fleming was ordained a priest of the Diocese of Helena on May 19, 1992, by Eldon F. Curtiss, Bishop of Helena. After his 1992 ordination, the diocese assigned Fleming as parochial vicar of the Anaconda Catholic Community in Anaconda Four years later, he was transferred to the Saint Helena Cathedral Parish to serve as associate pastor there.

Fleming then traveled to Washington D.C. to attend the Catholic University of America (CUA). He received a Licentiate of Canon Law from the CUA School of Canon Law in 1998. After returning to Montana in 1998, Fleming was named as chaplain of Carroll College. Fleming left Carroll in 2003 for several assignments as pastor in several Montana parishes:

- Saint Rose of Lima in Dillon (2003 to 2006)
- Christ the King in Missoula (2006 to 2013)
- Saint John the Baptist in Frenchtown (2013 to 2016
- Saint Michael in Drummond and Saint Philip in Philipsburg (2016 to 2019)

Bishop Austin Vetter appointed Fleming in 2019 as director of chancery services, vice chancellor, and adjutant judicial vicar. He was also named as administrator of Saint Thomas the Apostle Parish in Helmville, Montana and of Saint Jude Parish in Lincoln, Montana. He was elevated in 2020 to chancellor, moderator of the curia and adjunct judicial vicar. Fleming also served on the priests council and the college of consultors, as well as a board member of Missoula Catholic Schools.

In response to a 2020 instruction from the Vatican's Congregation for the Clergy regarding role of the parish in view of the institutional decline of the Catholic Church, Fleming said that every parishioner is called to be a:

"...witness of Christ, a light to the world..Pope Francis is calling us to be a church that looks outwardly, not just inside the church itself... To bring more people to the table, especially the poor and marginalized."

=== Coadjutor Bishop and Bishop of Great Falls-Billings ===
Coat of arms as coadjutor bishop of Great Falls-Billings

Pope Francis appointed Fleming as coadjutor bishop of the Diocese of Great Falls-Billings on April 19, 2022, to assist Bishop Michael Warfel He was consecrated by Warfel in Great Falls, Montana, on June 22 at Holy Spirit Catholic Church. Bishop George Leo Thomas was to have served as one of his co-consecrators but tested positive for COVID-19. Archbishop Alexander Sample served in his place.

Pope Francis accepted Warfel's resignation on 22 Aug 2023. Fleming succeeded Warfel as bishop of the Diocese of Great Falls-Billings at that time.

== See also ==
- Catholic Church hierarchy
- Catholic Church in the United States
- Historical list of the Catholic bishops of the United States
- List of Catholic bishops of the United States
- Lists of patriarchs, archbishops, and bishops

Catholic Church titles
Preceded by Michael William Warfel	Bishop of Great Falls-Billings; 2023-Present	Succeeded by Incumbent
Preceded by -	Coadjutor of Great Falls-Billings; 2022-2023	Succeeded by -
