= Augustine Francis Schinner =

American prelate

His Excellency, The Right Reverend Augustine Francis Schinner
- Bishop of Spokane
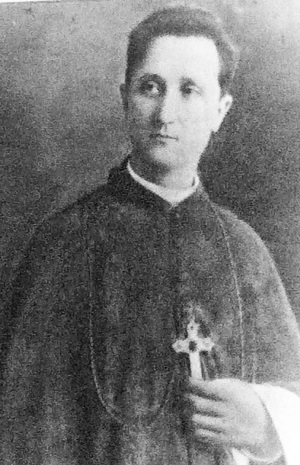
- Bishop Schinner in Milwaukee 1905
- Church: Roman Catholic Church
- See: Diocese of Spokane
- In office: April 18, 1914 to December 17, 1925
- Predecessor: None
- Successor: Charles Daniel White
- Previous post: Bishop of Superior (1905 to 1913)

Orders
- Ordination: March 7, 1886 by Michael Heiss
- Consecration: July 25, 1905 by Diomede Falconio

Personal details
- Born: May 1, 1863 Milwaukee, Wisconsin US
- Died: February 7, 1937 (aged 73) Milwaukee
- Buried: Holy Cross Cemetery, Milwaukee
- Parents: Michael and Mary Schinner
- Education: St. Francis Seminary
- Motto: Pro Dio (For God)

Augustine Francis Schinner (May 1, 1863 – February 7, 1937) was an American prelate of the Roman Catholic Church. He served as the first bishop of the Diocese of Superior in Wisconsin from 1905 to 1913 and as the first bishop of the Diocese of Spokane in Washington State from 1914 to 1925.

== Biography ==
=== Early life ===
Augustine Schinner was born in Milwaukee, Wisconsin, on May 1, 1863. He attended St. Mary's Church and school in that city. Deciding to become a priest, he entered St. Francis Seminary in St. Francis, Wisconsin.

=== Priesthood ===
Schinner was ordained to the priesthood for the Archdiocese of Milwaukee on March 7, 1886, by Archbishop Michael Heiss at the Cathedral of St. John the Evangelist in Milwaukee. After his ordination, the archdiocese assigned Schinner for one year as pastor of St. Hubertus Parish in Hubertus, Wisconsin. In 1887, Schinner was added to the faculty of St. Francis de Sales Seminary. Archbishop Frederick Katzer appointed Schinner in 1893 as his chancellor and vicar general.

After Katzer died in 1902, the clergy in the archdiocese elected Schinner to serve as apostolic administrator.

=== Bishop of Superior ===
On May 13, 1905, Pope Pius X appointed Schinner as the first bishop of the newly created Diocese of Superior. He was consecrated at the Cathedral of St. John the Evangelist in Milwaukee by Cardinal Diomede Falconio on July 25, 1905. The clergy in Superior gave Schinner a crosier and the parishioners of St. Mary's in Milwaukee a pectoral cross.Traveling by train with an entourage of over 60 priests from Milwaukee, he arrived at Ashland, Wisconsin, traveled to the Apostle Islands on a short boat tour, and then continued on to Superior, Wisconsin.

When Schinner became bishop, the new diocese had 39 diocesan priests, 17 religious order priests serving 38,861 Catholics in 43 parishes with resident pastors, and 50 missions and 33 stations. There was one high school, 16 elementary and two boarding schools with a total enrollment of 9,016 students. Schinner immediately saw the need for an additional ten priests. He succeeded in recruiting 12 seminarians from St. Francis de Sales Seminary.

Schinner contracted typhoid in February 1906 and was admitted into St. Mary's Hospital in Superior. In August 1906, Schinner convened the first diocesan synod in Bayfield, Wisconsin.

As a missionary bishop, he learned first hand the difficulties of travel into remote rural counties. He took an interest in evangelizing among the nearly 4,000 Catholic Native Americans. On February 7, 1913, Pope Benedict XV accepted Schinner's resignation as bishop of Superior.

=== Bishop of Spokane ===
On March 18, 1914, Schinner was appointed first bishop of the new Diocese of Spokane by Benedict XV. Schinner was installed on April 18, 1914. In 1919, the diocese purchased the Jones House (built by the architect Alfred D. Jones in 1909) as the residence for Schinner and a gathering place for Spokane's rapidly growing Catholic population. The Jones House subsequently served as the residence for two more bishops until the diocese sold the property in 1968.

=== Retirement and legacy ===
On December 17, 1925, Pope Pius XI accepted Schinner's resignation as bishop of Spokane. After his resignation, Schinner served as a missionary in Bolivia until 1928. After returning to Milwaukee, he spent the rest of his life serving as chaplain for the Sisters of the Divine Savior in Milwaukee.

Augustine Schinner died of pneumonia at St. Mary's Hospital in Milwaukee on February 7, 1937, at age 73. He was buried in Holy Cross Cemetery in Milwaukee.

== See also ==
- Catholic Church hierarchy
- Catholic Church in the United States
- Historical list of the Catholic bishops of the United States
- List of Catholic bishops of the United States
- Lists of patriarchs, archbishops, and bishops

Catholic Church titles
Preceded by None	Bishop of Spokane; 1914–1925	Succeeded by Charles Daniel White
Preceded by None	Bishop of Superior; 1905–1913	Succeeded by Joseph Maria Koudelka
