= Elmhurst station (Illinois) =

Commuter rail station in Elmhurst, Illinois

Elmhurst

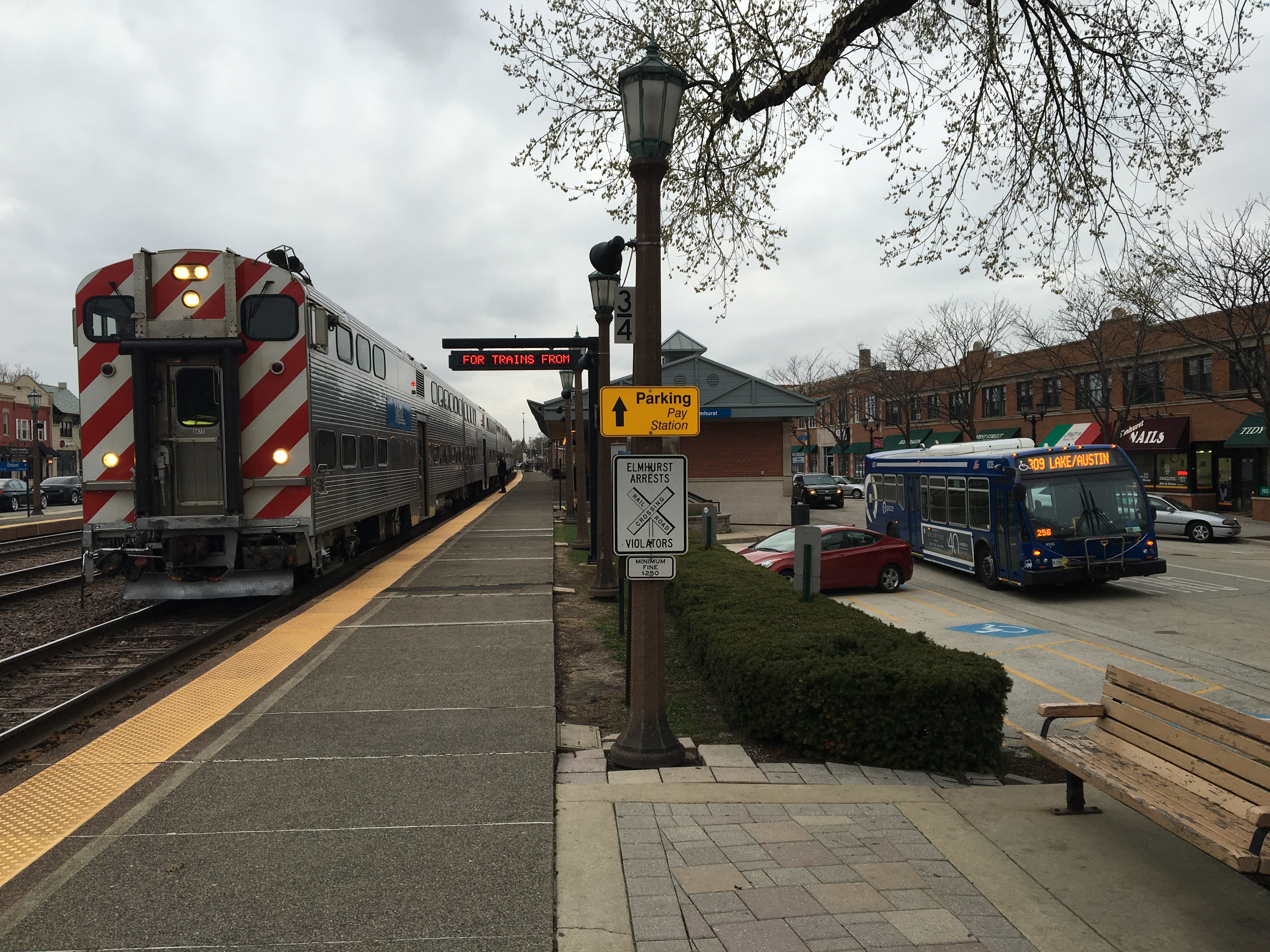
- Elmhurst station in April 2016

General information
- Location: 128 West 1st Street; Elmhurst, Illinois 60126
- Coordinates: 41.8998°N 87.9408°W
- Owner: City of Elmhurst
- Line: Union Pacific West Line
- Platforms: 2 side platforms
- Tracks: 3
- Connections: Pace

Construction
- Parking: Yes
- Cycle facilities: Yes
- Accessible: Yes

Other information
- Fare zone: 3

History
- Opened: 1894; 132 years ago
- Rebuilt: 1965; 61 years ago 1989; 37 years ago
- Original company: Chicago & North Western Railroad

Passengers
- October 2025: 1,550 (avg. weekday)
- Rank: 5 out of 236

Services
Preceding station	Metra	Following station
Villa Park toward Elburn	Union Pacific West	Berkeley toward Ogilvie TC
Former services
Preceding station	Chicago and North Western Railway	Following station
Villa Park toward Geneva	Galena Division	Berkeley toward Chicago
Track layout
Location

Elmhurst is a Metra commuter railroad station in downtown Elmhurst, Illinois, a western suburb of Chicago. It is served by the Union Pacific West Line, and lies 15.7 miles (25.3 km) from the eastern terminus. Trains go east to Ogilvie Transportation Center in Chicago and as far west as Elburn, Illinois. Travel time to Ogilvie ranges from 39 minutes on local trains to 26 minutes on express trains, as there are some trains that go non-stop between Elmhurst and Chicago. Evening peak trains make the run between Ogilvie and Elmhurst in as little as 24 minutes. As of 2018, Elmhurst is the fifth busiest of the 236 non-downtown stations in the Metra system, with an average of 1,550 weekday boardings. Unless otherwise announced, inbound trains use the north platform and outbound trains use the south platform.

As of September 8, 2025, Elmhurst is served by all 58 trains (29 in each direction) on weekdays, by all 20 trains (10 in each direction) on Saturdays, and by all 18 trains (nine in each direction) on Sundays and holidays.

The station is on ground level, on York Street between 1st Street and Park Avenue. Elmhurst University and Wilder Park Conservatory are both several blocks away. Pace suburban buses stop on York Street and on 1st Street. The station is just a few blocks west of Union Pacific's Proviso railroad yard. Due to the relatively close proximity to the railroad yard, Metra trains occasionally must use the middle track to avoid the frequent freight traffic. Because the middle track has no platform, the train's cab car receives and discharges passengers at the York Street railroad crossing when this does occur.

== Station History ==
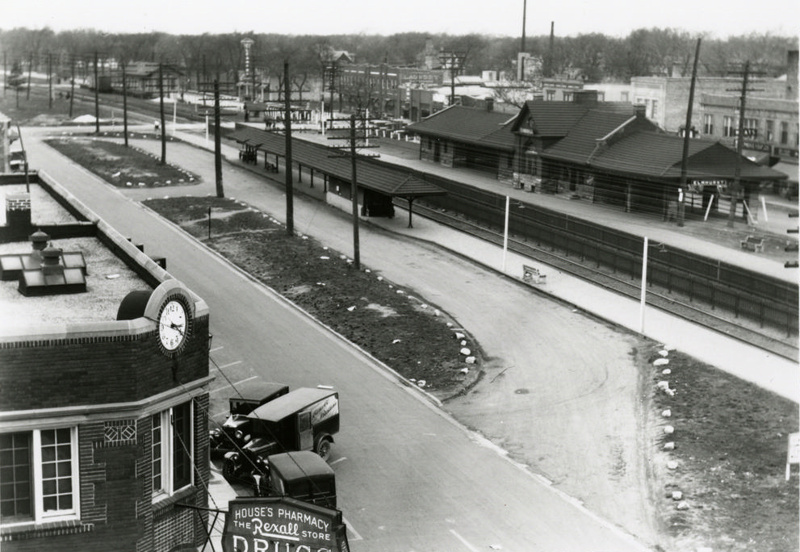
The 1894 Chicago & North Western Railroad Station. Circa 1931

Elmhurst's early development in the 1800s centered around the newly built Galena and Chicago Union Railroad, which would later become the Union Pacific West Line. At some point in the 1880s, a small freight depot was constructed to support increased farming and other businesses in the area. The first station in Elmhurst was not designed for passenger use.

As the then new Chicago and North Western Railroad began operating commuter passenger trains heading to and from Chicago, a new and much larger depot was constructed east of the freight depot in 1894. It was the first station in Elmhurst built exclusively for passenger use. The new station would have two platforms to accommodate the frequent passenger trains, with the north platform used for inbound trains and the south platform for outbound trains. The original freight depot was expanded around the same time and now found itself located between Cottage Hill Avenue and Maple Avenue. The 1894 station remained in use for 70 years until it was demolished and rebuilt from 1964 to 1965.

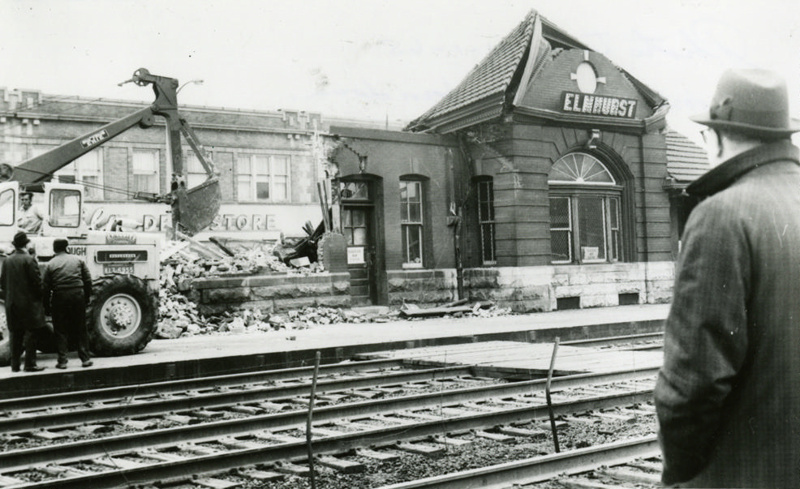
Demolition of the 1894 station. Circa 1965

The second and current station is much smaller than its predecessor, with elements of mid-century modern in design. The station saw minor improvements throughout the 1970s and 1980s, such as the addition of bike racks, newspaper boxes, and platform warning stripes. Most improvements were made after the Chicago Regional Transportation Authority, later known as Metra, took over C&NW's commuter operations in 1974. In 1987, the north and south platforms were extended and warning stripes were painted red. In early 1989, the station underwent major rehabilitation during Elmhurst's downtown redevelopment effort. The city was given a full grant from Metra with the goal to turn the station into an attractive people area. Upgrades included a new roof, extended platforms, a pedestrian underpass, heat lamps, and passenger information systems. To accompany the upgraded station, two parking garages were built for additional parking, despite early criticism.

In 2016, the City of Elmhurst began conceptualizing ideas to update the nearly 60 year old station. The new station was to include a new pedestrian tunnel under the tracks to allow riders to access both platforms in the event that grade crossings are blocked by trains. However, the project's status remained uncertain as of late 2025.

== Bus connections ==
Pace

- 309 Lake Street
- 332 River Road - York Road

== Gallery ==
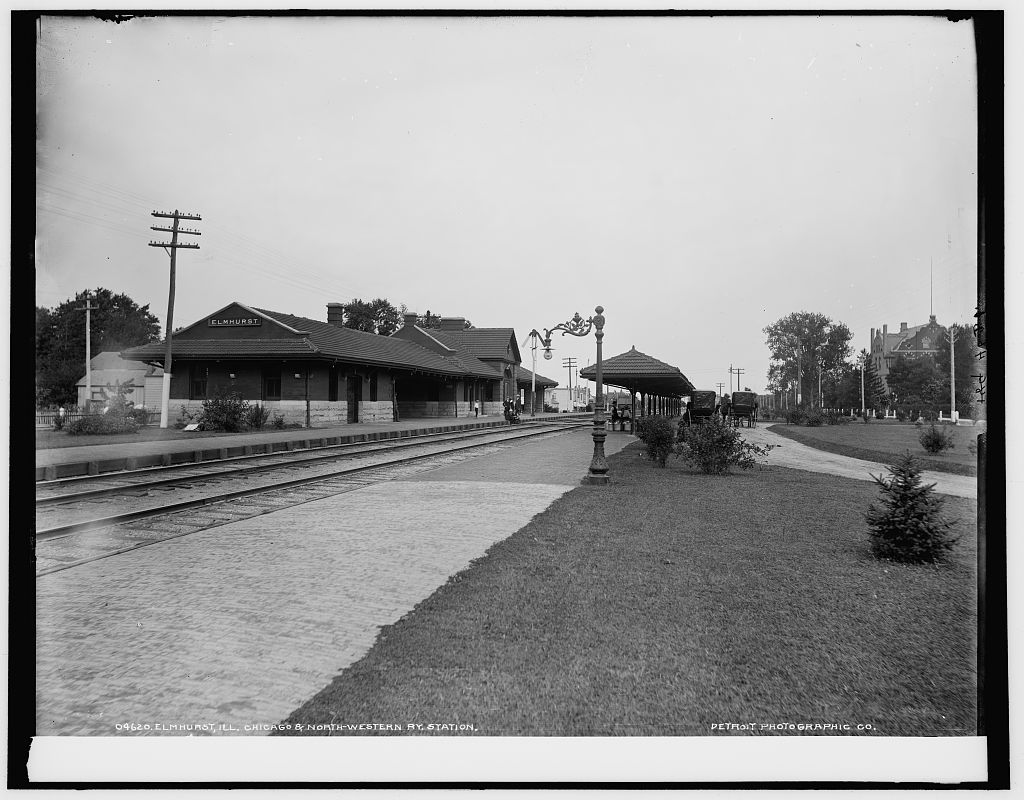
Elmhurst station circa 1890s.

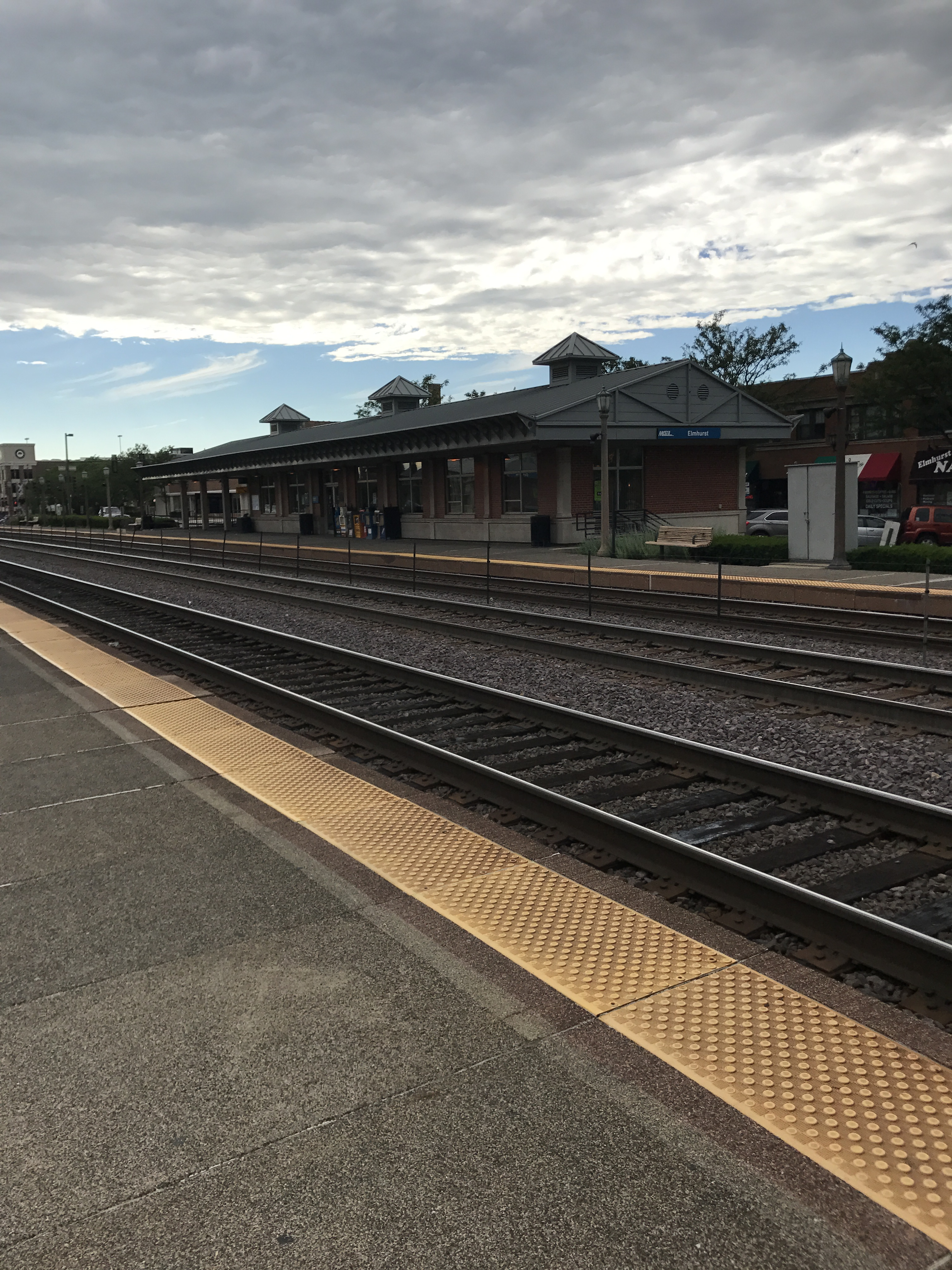
Wide shot of the south side of the station.

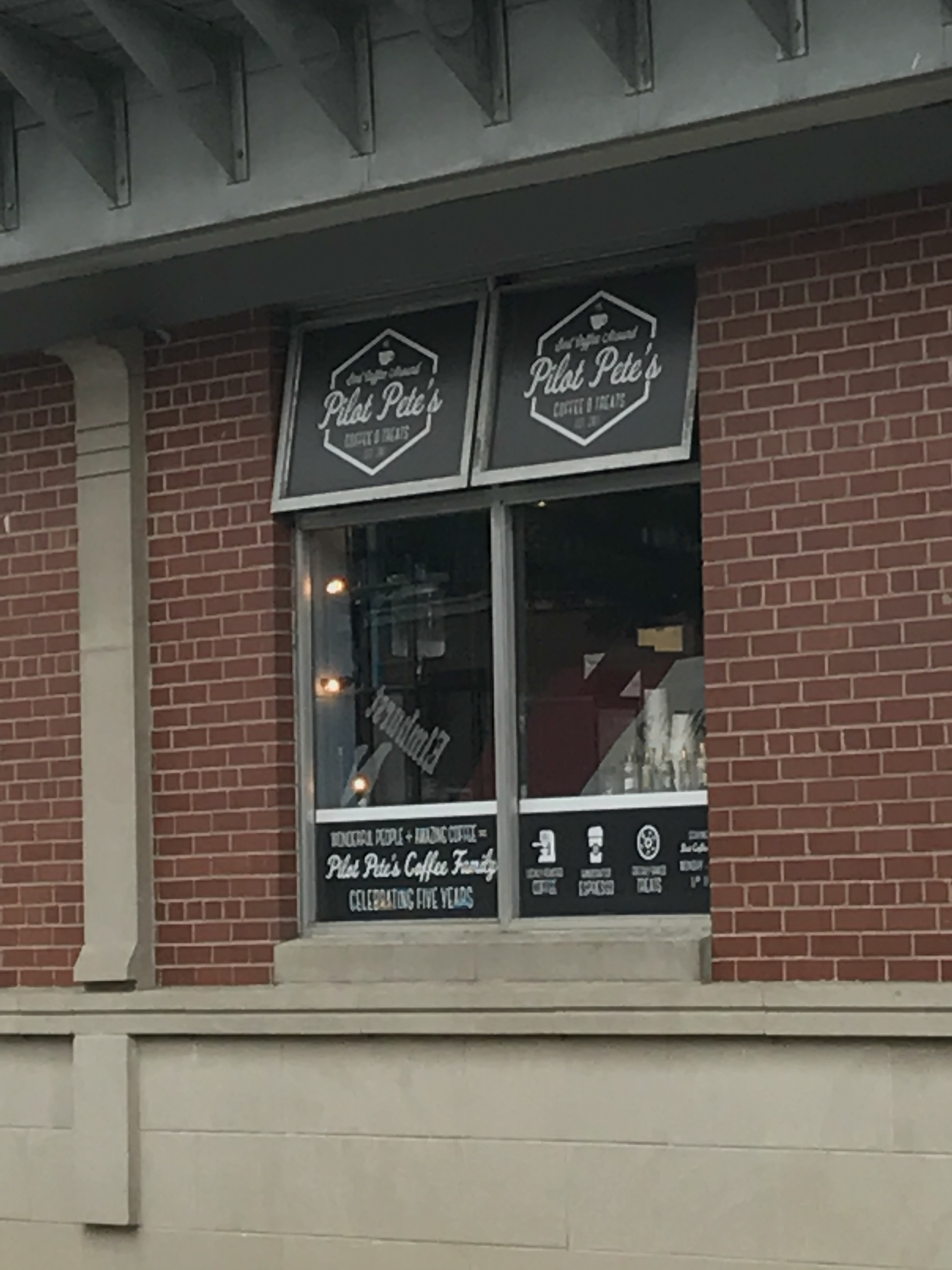
A picture of the windowfront of Pilot Pete's, a concession stand within the station.

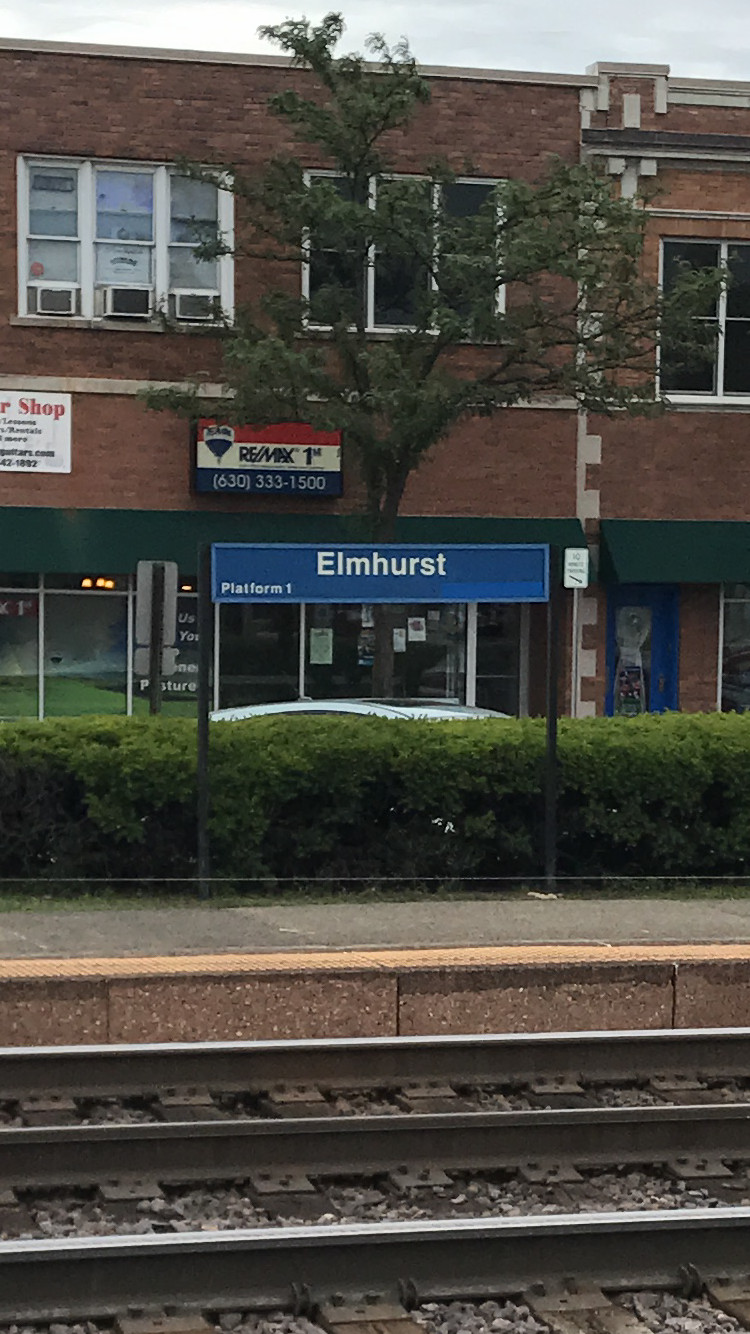
A platform sign at Elmhurst station.

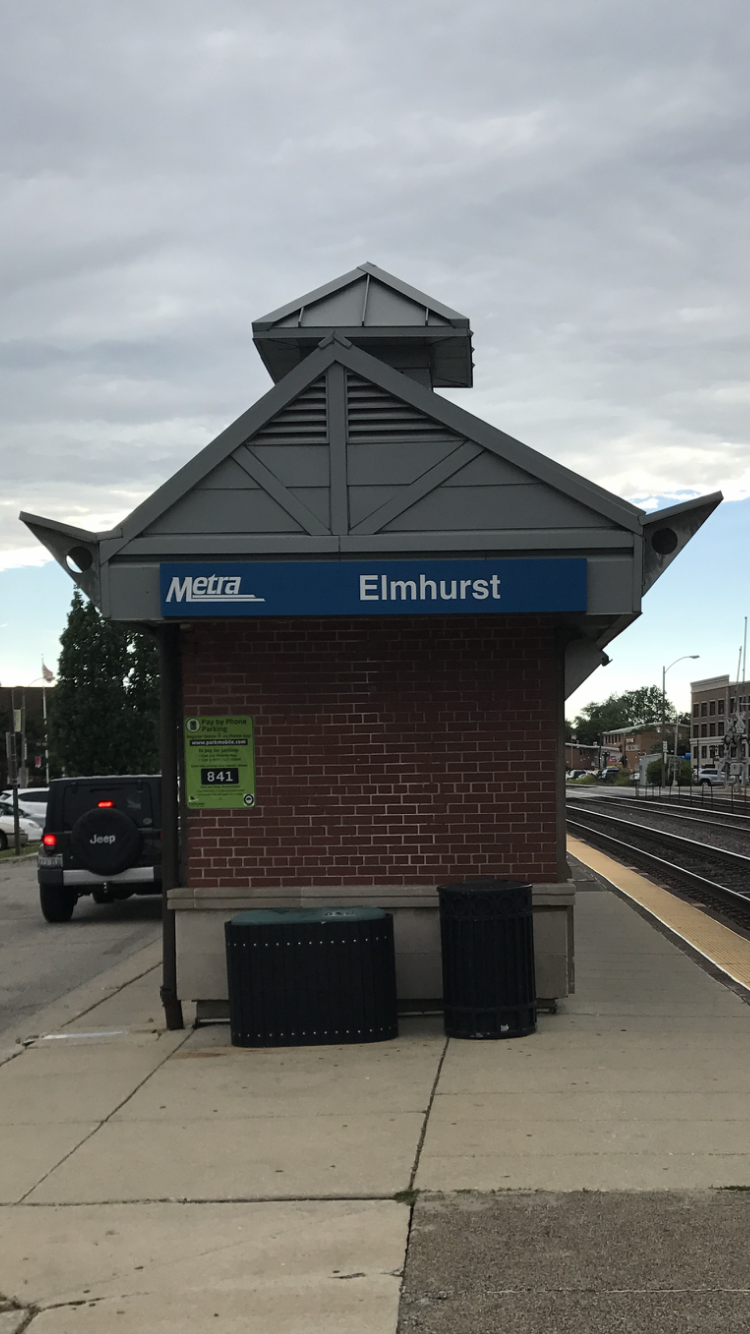
The entrance/exit to a pedestrian underpass that leads to the opposite site of the tracks.
