= Villa Park station =

Commuter rail station in Villa Park, Illinois

Villa Park

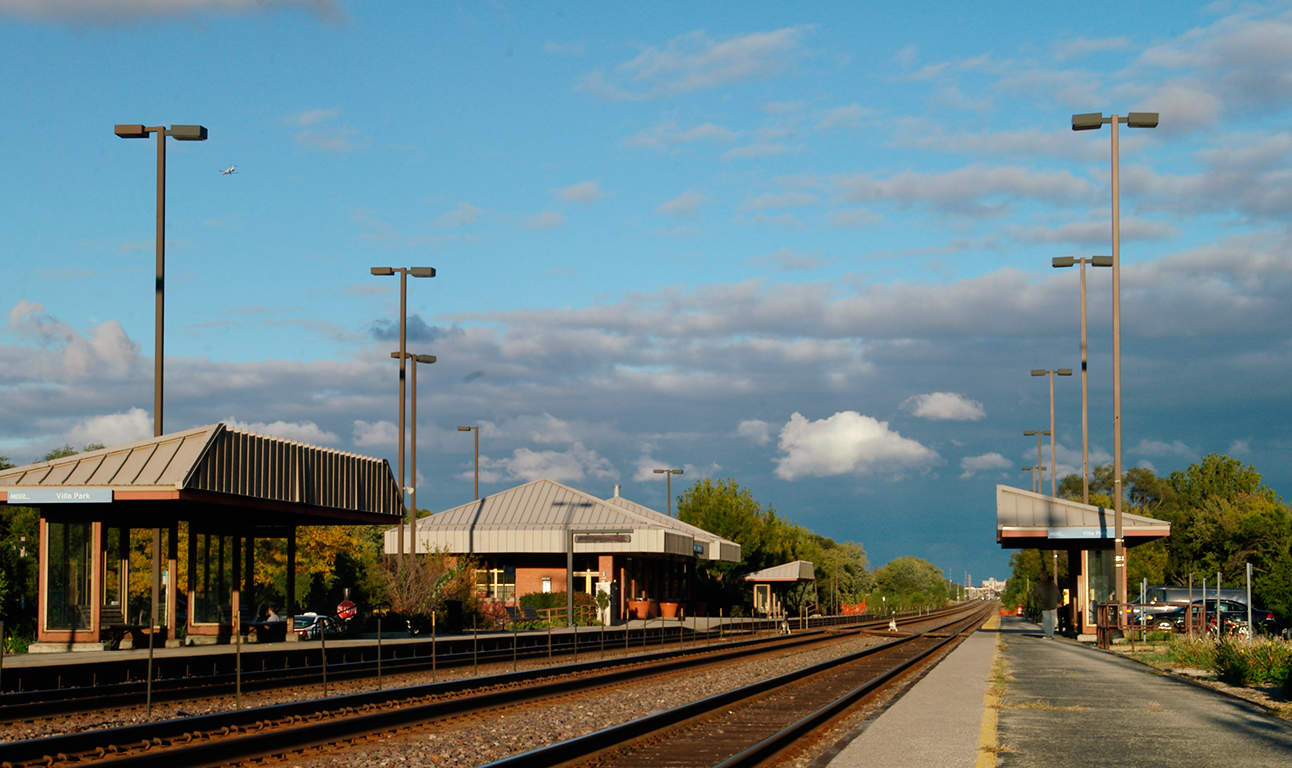
- Villa Park station in September 2010

General information
- Location: 349 North Ardmore Avenue, Villa Park, Illinois 60181
- Coordinates: 41.8965°N 87.9775°W
- Owner: Village of Villa Park
- Platforms: 2 side platforms
- Tracks: 3

Construction
- Parking: Yes
- Accessible: Yes

Other information
- Fare zone: 3

History
- Opened: 1908; 118 years ago
- Rebuilt: 1979; 47 years ago

Passengers
- 2018: 870 (average weekday) ▲5.1%
- Rank: 59 out of 236

Services
Preceding station	Metra	Following station
Lombard toward Elburn	Union Pacific West	Elmhurst toward Ogilvie TC
Former services
Preceding station	Chicago and North Western Railway	Following station
Lombard toward Geneva	Galena Division	Elmhurst toward Chicago
Track layout
Location

Villa Park is a Metra commuter railroad station in Villa Park, Illinois, a western suburb of Chicago. It is served by the Union Pacific West Line and lies 17.8 miles (28.6 km) from the eastern terminus. Trains go east to Ogilvie Transportation Center in Chicago and as far west as Elburn, Illinois. Travel time to Ogilvie ranges from 43 minutes on local trains to 31 minutes on express trains, with faster times during peak hours. As of 2018, Villa Park is the 59th busiest of the 236 non-downtown stations in the Metra system, with an average of 870 weekday boardings. Unless otherwise announced, inbound trains use the north platform and outbound trains use the south platform.

As of September 8, 2025, Villa Park is served by 54 trains (27 in each direction) on weekdays, by all 20 trains (10 in each direction) on Saturdays, and by all 18 trains (nine in each direction) on Sundays and holidays.

The station is on ground level, at North Ardmore Avenue and West Terrace Street, with parking lots north and south of the tracks. Villa Park's commercial district is centered on Ardmore Ave. and Saint Charles Road, several blocks south of the station. Another Villa Avenue station, which was built by the Chicago, Aurora, and Elgin Railroad in 1929, has been on the National Register of Historic Places since 1986.

Due to the relatively close proximity to Proviso Yard, Metra trains occasionally must use the middle track to avoid the frequent freight traffic. Because the middle track has no platform, the train's cab car receives and discharges passengers at the Ardmore Avenue railroad crossing when this does occur.
