= College Avenue station (Illinois) =

Commuter rail station in Wheaton, Illinois

College Avenue

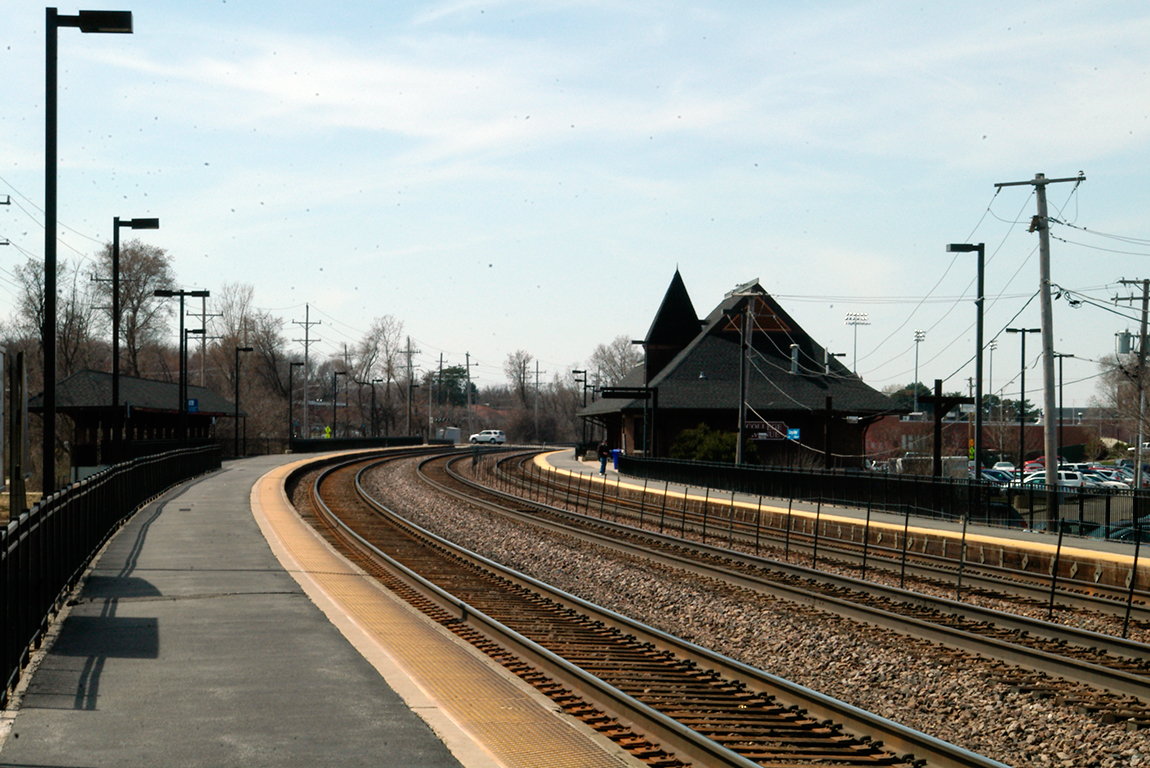
- College Avenue station in March 2010

General information
- Location: 303 North President Street, Wheaton, Illinois 60187
- Coordinates: 41.8685°N 88.0903°W
- Owner: City of Wheaton
- Platforms: 2 Side platforms
- Tracks: 3
- Connections: Pace bus

Construction
- Accessible: Yes

Other information
- Fare zone: 4

History
- Opened: 1971; 55 years ago
- Rebuilt: 2003; 23 years ago

Passengers
- 2018: 1,059 (average weekday) ▲15.4%
- Rank: 47 out of 236

Services
Preceding station	Metra	Following station
Wheaton toward Elburn	Union Pacific West	Glen Ellyn toward Ogilvie TC
Former services
Preceding station	Chicago and North Western Railway	Following station
Wheaton toward Geneva	Galena Division	Glen Ellyn toward Chicago
Preceding station	Chicago Aurora and Elgin Railroad	Following station
Services at adjacent College Avenue station
Wheaton Terminus	Main Line	Glen Ellyn toward Chicago
Track layout
Location

College Avenue is one of two stations on Metra's Union Pacific West Line located in Wheaton, Illinois. The station is located at 303 North President Street, and lies next to Wheaton College. The station is located 23.8 miles (38.3 km) away from Ogilvie Transportation Center, the eastern terminus of the West Line. In Metra's zone-based fare system, College Avenue is in zone 4. As of 2018, College Avenue is the 47th busiest of the 236 non-downtown stations in the Metra system, with an average of 1,059 weekday boardings. Unless otherwise announced, inbound trains use the north platform and outbound trains use the south platform.

As of September 8, 2025, College Avenue is served by 54 trains (28 inbound, 26 outbound) on weekdays, by all 20 trains (10 in each direction) on Saturdays, and by all 18 trains (nine in each direction) on Sundays and holidays.

College Avenue station is located at ground level and consists of two side platforms. Three tracks run between the platforms, though one does not access the station. There is a station house next to the inbound (north) track, which is open 24 hours. Tickets are available at the station house on weekdays. The Illinois Prairie Path runs along the south edge of the complex.

== Bus connections ==
Pace

- "Route 714 – College of DuPage/Naperville/Wheaton Connector". PaceBus.com. Chicago: Pace Suburban Bus Service.
