= Wheaton station =

Wheaton station could refer to:

- Wheaton station (Metra), in Wheaton, Illinois
- Wheaton station (Chicago Aurora and Elgin Railroad), defunct, in Wheaton, Illinois
- Wheaton station (Washington Metro), in Wheaton, Maryland
