= College of DuPage =

Public community college in Glen Ellyn, Illinois, US

- Type: Public community college
- Established: September 25, 1967; 59 years ago
- Accreditation: Higher Learning Commission
- Endowment: US$17.288 million (June 30, 2020)
- President: Muddassir Siddiqi
- Faculty: 256 full-time, 1,023 part-time (fall 2021)
- Students: 20,849 (fall 2021)
- Location: 425 Fawell Blvd., Glen Ellyn, Illinois, United States; 41°50′31″N 88°04′23″W
- Campus: 273 acres (110.5 ha); Suburban
- Colours: Green and grey
- Nickname: Chaparrals
- Sporting affiliations: National Junior College Athletic Association
- Website: www.cod.edu

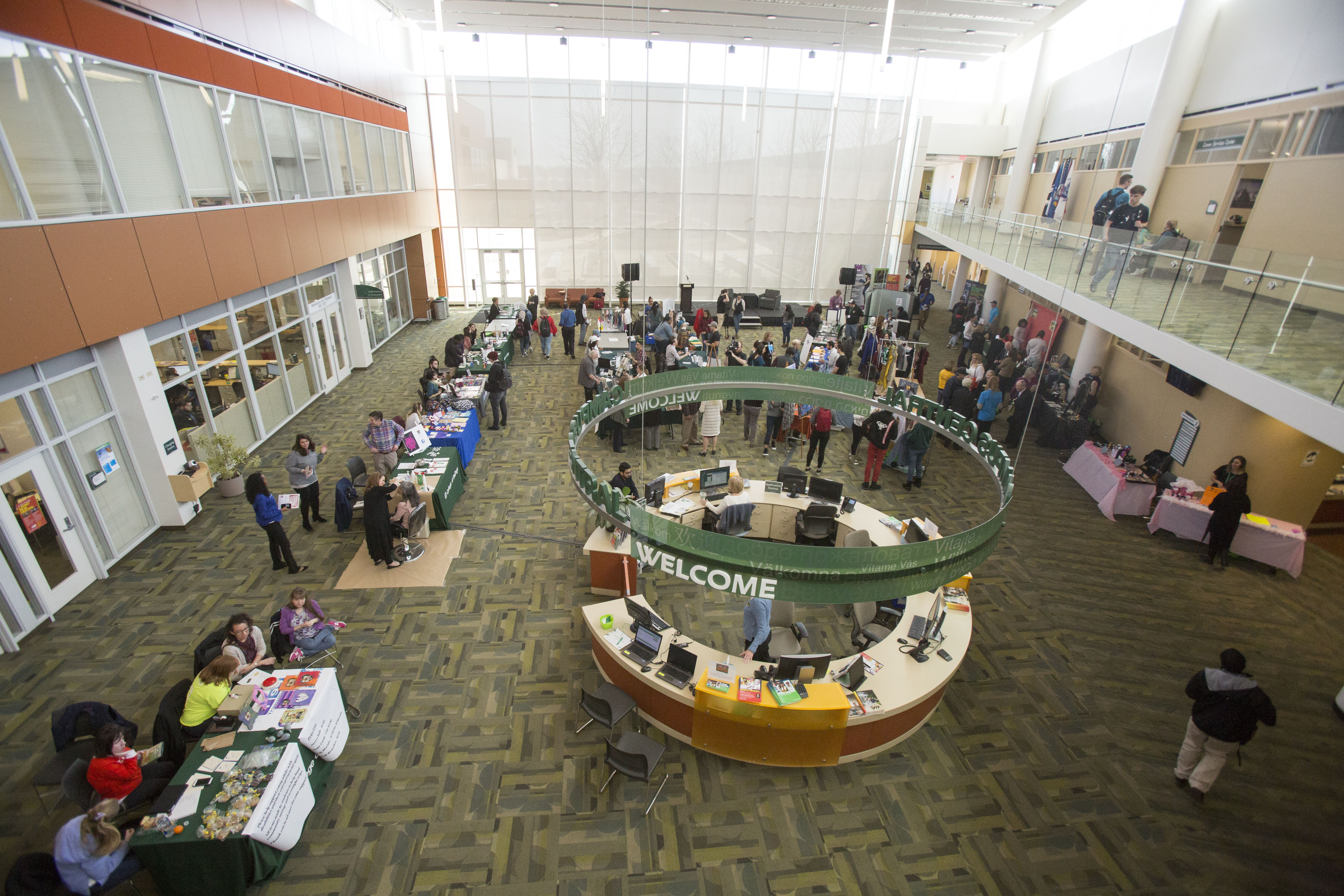
Welcome desk for students in College of DuPage Campus

The College of DuPage (COD) is a public community college with its main campus in Glen Ellyn, Illinois, and satellite campuses at Addison, Carol Stream, Naperville, and Westmont, Illinois, United States. The college serves more than 20,000 students residing in Illinois's Community College District 502.

== History ==
College of DuPage was established after the Illinois General Assembly adopted the Public Community College Act of 1965 and the approval of DuPage high school district voters in a referendum. The college opened on September 25, 1967, under the leadership of the college's president, Rodney K. Berg, and Board of Trustees Chairman George L. Seaton. At the time, classes were held in office trailers and leased suburban sites throughout the newly established Community College District 502. Due to the college's students, faculty and staff having to drive from building to building for classes, the chaparral was adopted as the school's mascot. That year, The Courier, the school's student newspaper, published its first issue.

In 1968, the Glen Ellyn campus location was acquired. A year later, three interim buildings were constructed west of Lambert Road in Glen Ellyn. The Berg Instructional Center, the college's first permanent building, opened in 1973. WDCB, a public radio station owned by the college, was founded in 1977. Harold D. McAninch was appointed as the college's second president in 1979. In 1982, the college began publishing the Prairie Light Review, a literary magazine. The Student Resource Center (SRC) and Physical Education and Recreation Center opened in 1983.

The McAninch Arts Center was built in 1986. In 1990, the Seaton Computing Center was built and housed computer-specific classrooms for the Computer Information Systems, Computer and Internet working Technologies, and Office Technology Information programs. A year later, the college opened new campus locations in Naperville and Westmont, Illinois.

Michael T. Murphy became the college's third president in 1994. (Note: During President Murphy's term, College of DuPage was America’s largest single-campus community college until 2003.) In 2002, voters approved a $183-million bond referendum that provided funds for renovating and rebuilding the Glen Ellyn campus and off-campus locations. Funds from the referendum were used to build the Homeland Security Education Center, the Student Services Center, and the Culinary & Hospitality Center. In 2003, Sunil Chand replaced Murphy as the college's president. That year the College expanded with the opening of the Bloomingdale Center for Independent Learning. The Carol Stream Community Education Center opened in 2004 and the West Chicago Community Education Center in 2005. In fall 2005, College of DuPage converted from a quarter system to a semester system.

In 2006, College of DuPage and the Indian Prairie District 204 created the Frontier Campus, a magnet school for District 204 seniors and an additional college regional center. The college's Early Childhood Center and new campus roadways and parking lots were completed in 2007. The following year, the college received a maximum seven-year re-accreditation through the North Central Association of Colleges and Schools Commission on Institutions of Higher Education.

In May 2008, the board of trustees abruptly removed the college president, Sunil Chand. Faculty members and students protested a November 2008 board meeting to implement conservative activist David Horowitz's "Academic Bill of Rights", which takes control over curriculum away from teachers and gives it to the school board. The faculty association sent a letter to the board noting that the changes were never discussed and no complaints over curriculum have been filed by students.

In January 2009, Robert L. Breuder became the college's president. The Health and Science Center and Technical Education Center opened that summer on the Glen Ellyn campus. The Technical Education Center is 178,000 square feet (16,500 m2) and houses the Automotive Technology, HVAC/ELMEC, Architecture, Horticulture, and Interior Design programs, and in a new steel, glass and precast concrete panel building on the west side of campus. The building was awarded LEED Silver certification and was designed to support horticulture, construction trades, architecture, interior design, construction management, and automotive technology.

In May 2016, Dr Ann Rondeau was elected to become the sixth president of the College of DuPage.

The 475,000-square-foot (44,100 m^{2}) BIC Renovation (phase one completed in 2011; phase two completed in 2012) and the new 65,000-square-foot (6,000 m^{2}) Student Services Center (SSC) (completed in 2011) included the reorganization of faculty and administrative departments, expanded student commons, updated classrooms and labs. The addition of the new Student Services Center which now connects the SRC and BIC with a large naturally lit commons, a new coffee shop and 'one-stop-shop' student services offices and operations. The renovation and Student Services Center replaced the deteriorating BIC exterior with a new, modern panel and glass exterior and bright interior spaces. The transfer of the classes to the BIC enabled the construction of the next phase of the Homeland Security Education Center expansion on the west side of campus. The project was designed by the Architecture firm Loebl Schlossman Hackl, with Brandon Lipman AIA as principal designer.

The Culinary and Hospitality Center (CHC) was completed in 2011. It houses culinary kitchens and bakeries, a six-room boutique hotel run by students of the hospitality program, two gourmet restaurants open to the public, a culinary amphitheater and the college's Multimedia Services department. Waterleaf, one of the college's two restaurants, seats 150 people. The project was also designed by the Architecture firm Loebl Schlossman Hackl, with Brandon Lipman AIA as principal designer.

Phase one of the Homeland Security Education Center was completed in 2011. The center houses the college's Criminal Justice and Fire Science Technology programs, as well as the Suburban Law Enforcement Academy and the COD police department.

=== Controversies ===
College of DuPage had a special fund for administrators called an "imprest fund." Any purchase made from the fund that is under the $15,000 is not subject to disclosure to the public or review by the board of trustees. The board reportedly failed to review the itemized receipts for $26 million of expenditures that college administrators have spent over 16 months. In October 2014, The Washington Times awarded COD its weekly "Golden Hammer Award", given for waste, fraud, and abuse, in response to its management of this fund.

In 2014, COD President Robert Breuder sent an email to the college's trustees asking them to come up with a justification that would allow the State of Illinois to disburse a $20 million grant that the legislature previously had approved. In the email, Breuder proposed associating the released funds with a planned $50 million teaching and learning center. The appropriation incident and Breuder's email led to an editorial in the Chicago Tribune that called the episode, "a seedy little money grab by officials at the College of DuPage".

On January 22, 2015, the board of trustees voted to give COD president Robert Breuder $763,000 as a retirement package. The Chicago Tribune wrote that "some trustees now acknowledge that the buyout was negotiated to terminate Breuder's contract, which had been secretly extended to 2019." A spokesman from the office of Illinois governor Bruce Rauner said the administration had been watching the entire vote process carefully and had notified the Illinois Community College Board, the state authority over community colleges. This retirement package was voted again during the January 28, 2015 meeting after the Edgar County Watchdogs and others won a temporary restraining order directing the board to hold its meetings in a room large enough to accommodate those wishing to attend. This second January meeting saw more than 500 attendees and at least 60 people spoke during public comment lasting several hours.

In December 2015, the Higher Learning Commission placed COD on accreditation probation due to concerns about "operating with integrity and governance of the College". That probation was lifted two years later.

== Academics ==
College of DuPage offers transfer degree and technical education programs in various fields and disciplines. The college offers nine associate degrees, 79 associate degree options, and 161 certifications. Academic opportunities can be found in nine different areas including Adult Fast Track, Dual Credit programs for high school students, Field Studies & Outdoor Adventures, Global Education, Honors programs, Learning Communities, STEM, Study Abroad, and Workforce Development.

The college offers "3+1 degree" programs to earn a bachelor of science or bachelor of arts degree. The program requires students to take three years of classes at College of DuPage and a fourth year taught by a partner university on College of DuPage's campus. Partner universities include Benedictine University, Concordia University Chicago, Governors State University, Lewis University, National Louis University, and Roosevelt University. Continuing Educational opportunities are categorized in five groupings: Adult Enrichment, Business Solutions, Healthcare Education, Professional Development, and Youth Academy.

College of DuPage has a meteorology program that offers students credit for storm chasing. It was the first program in the country to offer storm chasing classes to undergraduates in 1989. Students in the department participate in community skywarn programs as advance spotters. The architecture program is one of the college's strongest programs and many graduates transfer to University of Illinois at Urbana–Champaign or the University of Illinois at Chicago.

=== Engineering program ===
College of DuPage offers an Engineering 2+2 Program partnered with the University of Illinois at Urbana-Champaign to earn a bachelor's degree in engineering. Created in 2014, the program provides guaranteed transfer admission to their College of Engineering if specific qualifications are maintained throughout the two years. This program requires students to follow a planned arrangement of correlating courses that will set them up for their third collegiate year at the University of Illinois.

== Student life ==
The college offers over 60 academic and pre-professional clubs, culture and ethnic clubs, faith-based clubs, honors societies, literary and performing arts clubs, political clubs, and service oriented clubs. The Courier, a student newspaper, Courier TV News, a student run newscast, The Chaparral a summer-themed magazine, and the Prairie Light Review, a humanities magazine are three student publications the college publishes. The college houses WDCB, a public radio station.

=== Transportation ===
The main campus of the College of DuPage in Glen Ellyn is served by Pace. Routes 714 and 715 provide bus service from campus to Naperville station, College Avenue station, Wheaton station, Glen Ellyn station and other destinations.

== Athletics ==
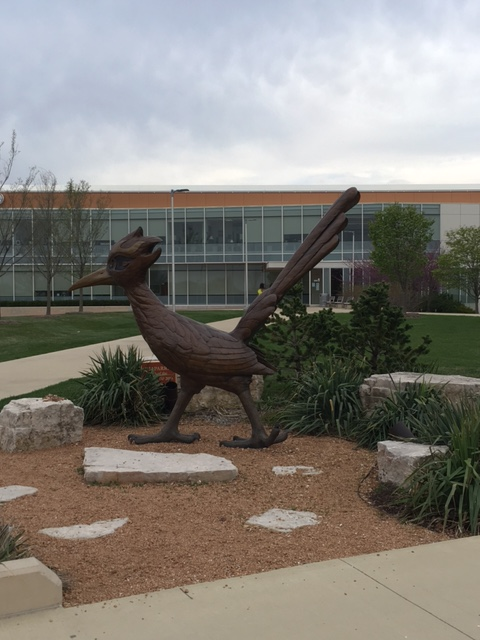
Statue of the College of DuPage mascot

A chaparral has always been DuPage's mascot. After fifty years of kelly green and gold, the current school colors are forest green and gray.

The College of DuPage was formerly a member of the North Central Community College Conference, but it joined a new independent alliance with other former member schools after the conference dissolved in 2023.

=== Baseball ===
The 1992 team was the first team at COD to reach the NJCAA World Series. They finished in second place, dropping the title game to Gloucester County of New Jersey. They were ranked #1 for the majority of the season and were led by head coach Steve Kranz, who was the 1992 Chicagoland Pitch and Hit Club Coach of the Year for local colleges and high schools. The Chaparrals were 40–12 in the season. In 1993 they featured pitcher Shayne Bennett, an Australia native who was drafted in the 25th round of the MLB draft by the Boston Red Sox. He would go on to pitch in MLB until the 2000 season.

=== Ice hockey ===
The men's ice hockey team won the college's first NJCAA championship in 1980. The college has a total of 31 NJCAA championship titles.

=== Track and field ===
The men's track and field team has competed in both NJCAA Division III and Division I. In Division III, College of DuPage was national champion for outdoor track and field in 2002, 2003, 2006, 2010 and 2021.

Tom Pukstys began his career at COD before going on to compete in his first Olympic Games in 1992, coming in 10th place. Troy Doris from Bolingbrook, Illinois, also started his career at COD. In 2016, he appeared for Guyana in the triple jump, placing 7th.

=== Football ===
The men's football team has been in six NJCAA bowls games since 2000. The school has won two of the six bowl games. The first was the Citizens Bank Bowl, in 2012. The second was the Red Grange Bowl in 2016, the first bowl game hosted by College of DuPage. In 2021 and 2022, the football team won back-to-back NJCAA Division III championships, beating Nassau Community College and North Dakota State College of Science.

The men's football team has sent several athletes to four-year universities. Fahn Cooper played during the 2013 season. He transferred to the University of Mississippi and later was drafted to the San Francisco 49ers in the 5th round of the NFL 2016 draft.

=== National championships ===
==== Men's ====
- Division III basketball: 2002
- Division III cross country: 2022, 2024
- Division III football: 2021, 2022, 2023, 2024, 2025
- Division III golf: 1996, 1997, 1998
- Ice hockey: 1980, 1988, 1990
- Soccer: 1993
- Division III tennis: 1997, 1999, 2003, 2004, 2005
- Division III outdoor track and field: 2002, 2003, 2006, 2010, 2021, 2022, 2023, 2024, 2025, 2026
- Division III volleyball: 2025

==== Women's ====
- Division III basketball: 2000, 2002
- Division III softball: 1998, 2000, 2001, 2004
- Division III outdoor track and field: 2000, 2001, 2002, 2004, 2021, 2025, 2026
- Division III tennis: 2008, 2010
- Division III volleyball: 1998, 1999, 2022

== Main campus ==
=== Berg Instructional Center ===
The Berg Instructional Center (BIC) was opened in 1974. The structure spans four levels that houses many classrooms, workshops, labs, department offices as well as faculty offices, and conference areas. It was named after the College of DuPage's first president, Rodney K. Berg.

=== Culinary and Hospitality Center ===
The Culinary and Hospitality Center (CHC) was completed in 2011. The center houses kitchens and bakeries, a six-room boutique Hotel run by students of the Hospitality program, two gourmet restaurants open to the public, a culinary amphitheater and the colleges TV station and video production departments. Waterleaf, one of the restaurant the center houses, serves brunch, lunch and dinner on Monday, Thursday and Sunday. Tuesday and Wednesdays students in the College of DuPage Culinary Program take over the restaurant space and provide their own brand of cooking and dinner service.

=== Early Childhood Center ===
The Early Childhood Center (ECC) was completed in 2007. The center serves more than 100 children and houses the Early Childhood Education and Care degree and certificate programs. This building is located across College rd. from the main campus. It has kindergarten, part-time preschool, a daycare and full-time preschool. The Early Childhood Center was closed June 1, 2018 due to a decline in enrollment and increased operational costs.

=== Health and Science Center ===
The Health and Science Center (HSC) was funded by the proceeds of the 2002 capital referendum and opened in 2010. The center houses the Basic Nursing Assistant, Dental Hygiene, Diagnostic Medical Imaging, Health Science, Nuclear Medicine, Nursing, Physical Therapist Assistant, Radiography, Respiratory Care, Surgical Technology, Anatomy and Physiology, Microbiology, Biology, Chemistry, Zoology and Botany programs. The HSC also houses a Nursing Simulation and Long-Term care lab, Dental Hygiene lab and Surgical Technology operating room lab. The building received LEED Gold certification.

=== Robert J. Miller Homeland Security Education Center ===
Phase one of the Homeland Security Education Center (HEC) was funded by the proceeds of the 2002 capital referendum and completed in 2011. It houses the Criminal Justice program, the Fire Science/EMS program, the Suburban Law Enforcement Academy and the COD police department.

The center has an Immersive Interior Training Lab, forensics and cybercrimes labs, an auditorium that doubles as a mock courtroom, a self-contained breathing apparatus lab, and a debriefing room.

The center also includes a Memorial to the September 11 attacks in the form of several exhibits in its lobby with the centerpiece being a steel beam recovered from the towers.

=== McAninch Arts Center ===
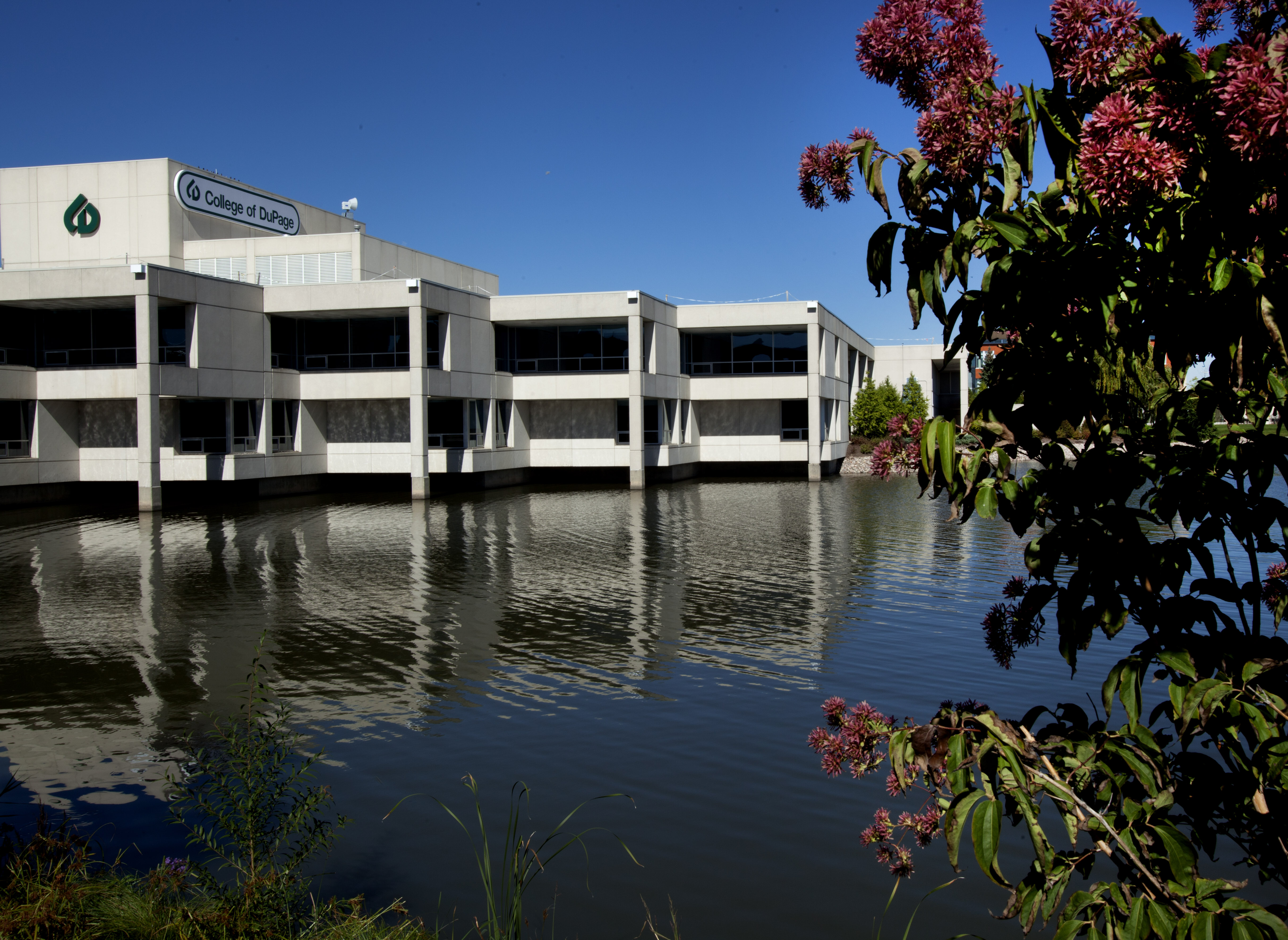
McAninch Arts Center

McAninch Arts Center (MAC) was built in 1986, and is named after the college's second president. The center has the Cleve Carney Museum of Art, a space for visual art exhibition by professionals, faculty, and student exhibits. The center has three performing spaces, the 780-seat proscenium Belushi Performance Hall, the 186-seat soft-thrust playhouse theater and the 70-seat black box studio theater. The center houses classrooms for the college's academic programming and the 1,200 capacity outdoor Lakeside Pavilion. The center is home to two resident professional ensembles: Buffalo Theatre Ensemble, and New Philharmonic. Annually, the MAC presents tour artists both national and international in the disciplines of theater, music, and dance. A $35 million renovation to the center was completed in 2013. The renovation updated the major performance spaces, addressed significant infrastructure needs and improved several academic program areas.

=== Natural areas ===
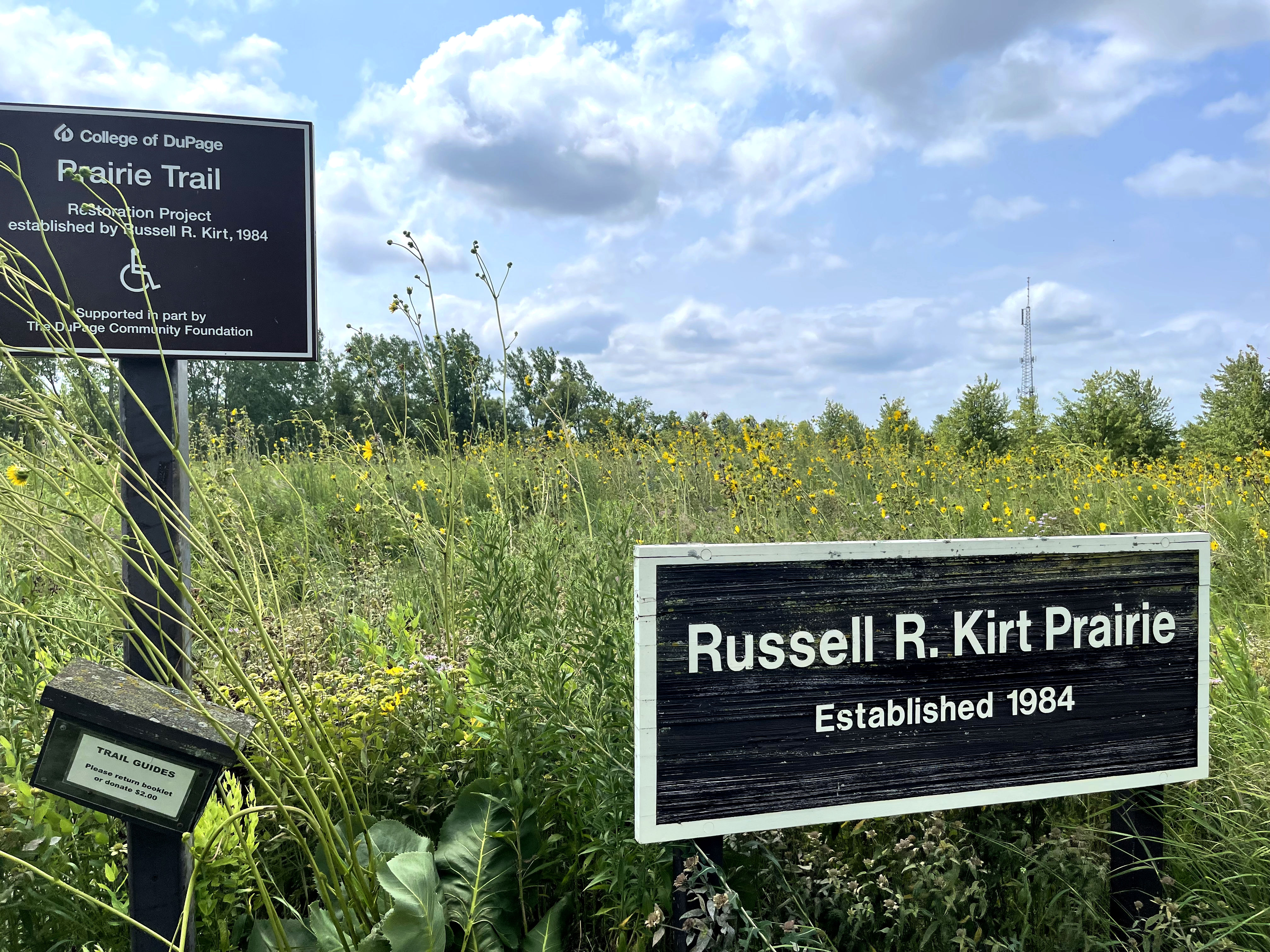
Russell R. Kirt Prairie sign

The Russell R. Kirt Prairie, Ecological Study Area and B.J. Hoddinott Wildlife Sanctuary are three natural areas maintained by College of DuPage on the Glen Ellyn campus. The College of DuPage boasts several natural areas on its campus. Notably, there is a garden maintained by the colleges horticulture program, as well as a pavilion that was thoughtfully designed by the architecture program. In Addition, in the summer of 2023, the architecture program contributed further to the natural beauty by designing and building a new shed for the garden (Professor Mark Pearson with Design + Build class: Esmeralda Arteaga, Barakat Hasan, Brandon Martinez, Denise Sanchez, and Sami Syed) Tours and work events are offered to the public.

=== Physical Education Center ===
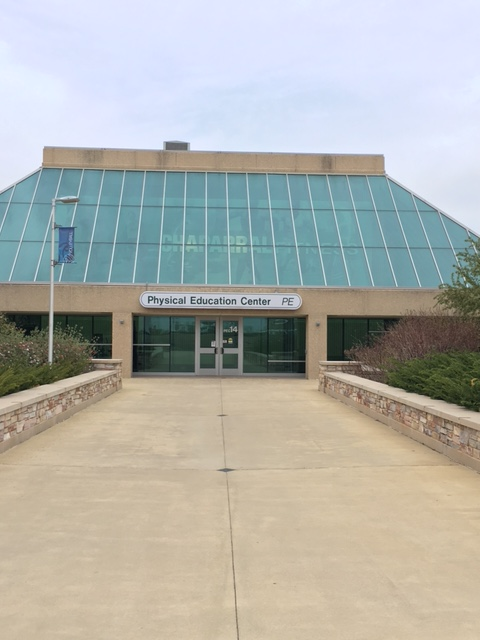
PE Center

The Physical Education Center (PEC) is where the athletic program is and it also holds classrooms for many other courses. It also has a fitness area on the 2nd floor which students and staff of the school as well as community members can join.

=== Seaton Computing Center ===
The Seaton Computing Center (SCC) was built in 1990 and houses computer-specific classrooms for the Computer Information Systems, Computer and Internetworking Technologies, and Office Technology Information programs.

=== Student Resource Center ===
The Student Resource Center (SRC) holds the library, bookstore, Jack H. Turner Conference Center, Records, Learning Commons, Continuing Education/Extended Learning, Academic Computing Center, main cafeteria, and offices for the president.

The library has partnerships with various community-based and state and national library organizations. The Library's Philanthropy Center is a partnership with the Donors Forum of Chicago. The Library also has a residency in community college librarianship program, designed to offer a two-year intensive, mentored experience in community college librarianship to a recent library school graduate. The Library also provides resources and facilities for the college's Library Technical Assistance (LTA) certificate program. In January 2000, the library received the Excellence in Academic Libraries Award, sponsored by the Association of College and Research Libraries and Blackwells' Book Services.

=== Student Services Center ===
The Student Services Center (SSC) was completed in the fall of 2011, and is located in between the SRC and the BIC. Regarded as the "living room" of COD, the SCC holds the Admissions and Outreach, Campus Central, Counseling and Advising, Financial Aid, Academic Support, Registration, Records, Testing Center, Veterans Administrative Services, and the Cashier's Office. This building also holds the COD Board Room, Student Activities, and Veteran's lounge on the second floor.

=== Technical Education Center ===
The Technical Education Center (TEC) was funded through proceeds from the 2002 capital referendum, and was completed in 2010. It houses the college's Architecture, Interior Design, Horticulture, Automotive Technology, Computer-Aided Design, Construction Management, Electro-Mechanical Technology, Electronics-Integrated Engineering Technology, HVAC-R, Manufacturing Technology and Welding Technology programs. The building is LEED certified.

== Satellite campuses ==
Besides the main campus in Glen Ellyn, the College of DuPage operates four other smaller locations in Illinois including one in Westmont, one in Naperville, one in Addison and one in Carol Stream. These provide many of the same services as the main campus, including tutoring and testing.

== Notable faculty and alumni ==
=== Alumni ===
- Matthew John Armstrong, actor (American Dreams, Heroes, The Young and the Restless)
- Aaron Bailey, football player
- Jim Belushi, actor and comedian (According to Jim)
- John Belushi, actor and comedian (Animal House, The Blues Brothers, Saturday Night Live)
- Steven Best, animal rights activist, author, talk-show host, and associate professor of philosophy at the University of Texas at El Paso
- Diane Blair-Sherlock, Illinois state representative
- Nick Fuentes, far right political commentator
- Bill Hillmann, author and bull-runner
- Karen McConnaughay, member of the Illinois Senate; graduated with an associate's from College of DuPage
- Bob McMillen, football player and member of the Arena Football Hall of Fame
- Lamorne Morris, actor (New Girl, Game Night)
- Marisol Nichols, actress (24, Hermione Lodge on Riverdale, The Princess and the Marine)
- Bob Odenkirk, actor, comedian and writer (Better Call Saul, Mr. Show with Bob and David)
- Tom Pukstys, six-time U.S. javelin champion, and member of the 1992 and 1996 U.S. Summer Olympic teams
- Matt Rahn, offensive lineman for several Arena Football League teams; played football for the College of DuPage Chaparrals
- Paul Spicer, defensive end with five NFL teams

== See also ==
- Illinois Community College System
- List of community colleges
