= Winfield station =

Commuter rail station in Winfield, Illinois

Winfield

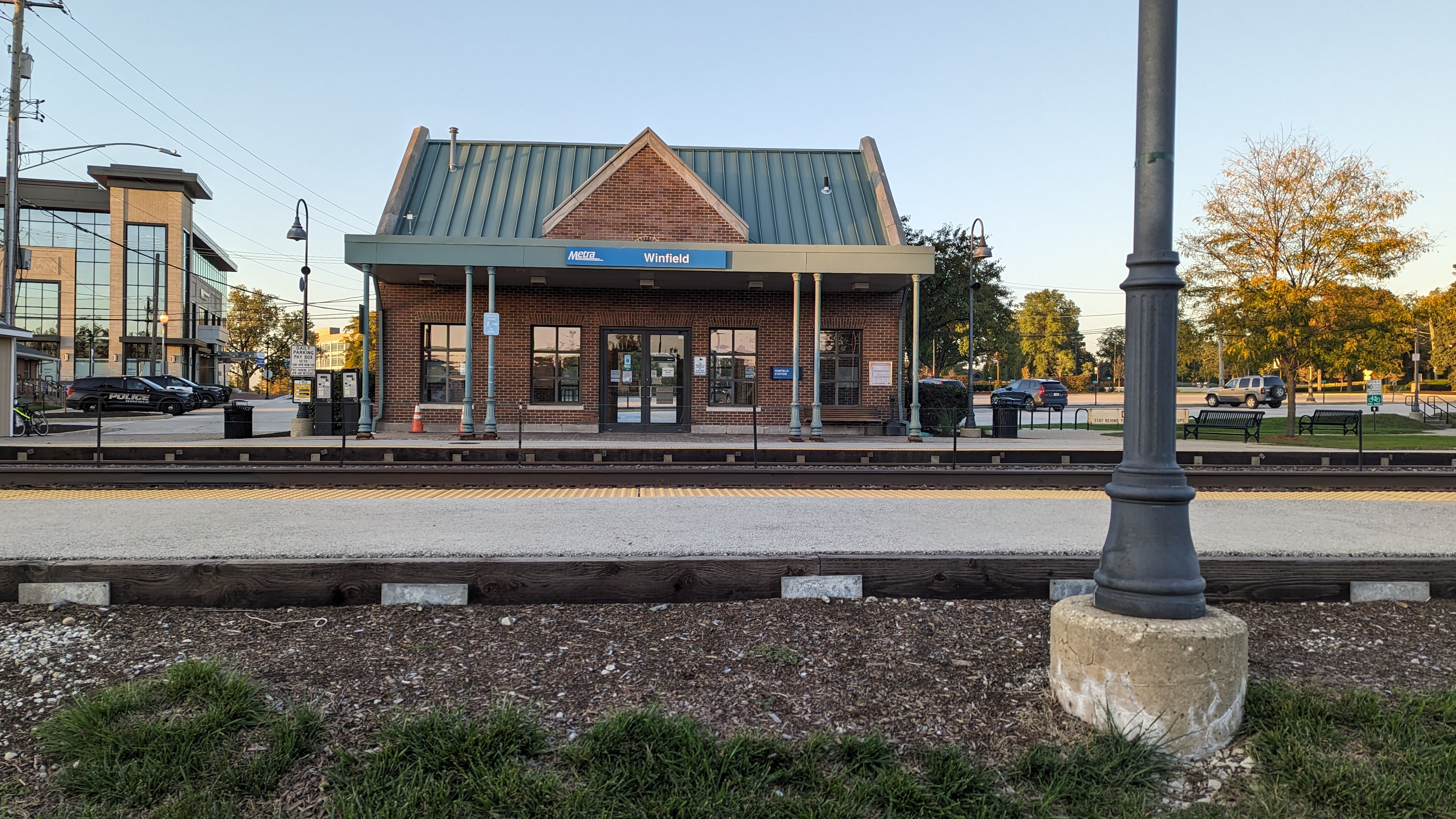
- Winfield station in October 2023

General information
- Location: Jewell Road and Winfield Road; Winfield, Illinois
- Coordinates: 41.8700°N 88.1568°W
- Platforms: 2 side platforms
- Tracks: 3

Construction
- Accessible: Yes

Other information
- Fare zone: 4

History
- Opened: 1980; 46 years ago

Passengers
- 2018: 496 (average weekday) ▼2.2%
- Rank: 99 out of 236

Services
Preceding station	Metra	Following station
West Chicago toward Elburn	Union Pacific West	Wheaton toward Ogilvie TC
Former services
Preceding station	Chicago and North Western Railway	Following station
West Chicago toward Geneva	Galena Division	Wheaton toward Chicago
Track layout
Location

Winfield is a station on Metra's Union Pacific West Line, located in Winfield, Illinois, at the corner of Jewell Road and Winfield Road. The station is 27.5 miles (44.3 km) away from Ogilvie Transportation Center, the eastern terminus of the West Line. In Metra's zone-based fare system, Winfield is in zone 4. As of 2018, Winfield is the 99th busiest of the 236 non-downtown stations in the Metra system, with an average of 496 weekday boardings. Unless otherwise announced, inbound trains use the north platform and outbound trains use the south platform.

As of September 8, 2025, Winfield is served by 49 trains (25 inbound, 24 outbound) on weekdays, by all 20 trains (10 in each direction) on Saturdays, and by all 18 trains (nine in each direction) on Sundays and holidays.

Winfield station is located at ground level and consists of two side platforms. Three tracks run between the platforms, though one does not access the station. There is an unstaffed station house next to the north track, which is open 24 hours. No bus connections are available at Winfield.

== Surrounding area ==
The station is within walking distance of Central DuPage Hospital.
