= DeKalb Public Transit =

Provider of mass transportation in DeKalb County, Illinois

Dekalb Public Transit
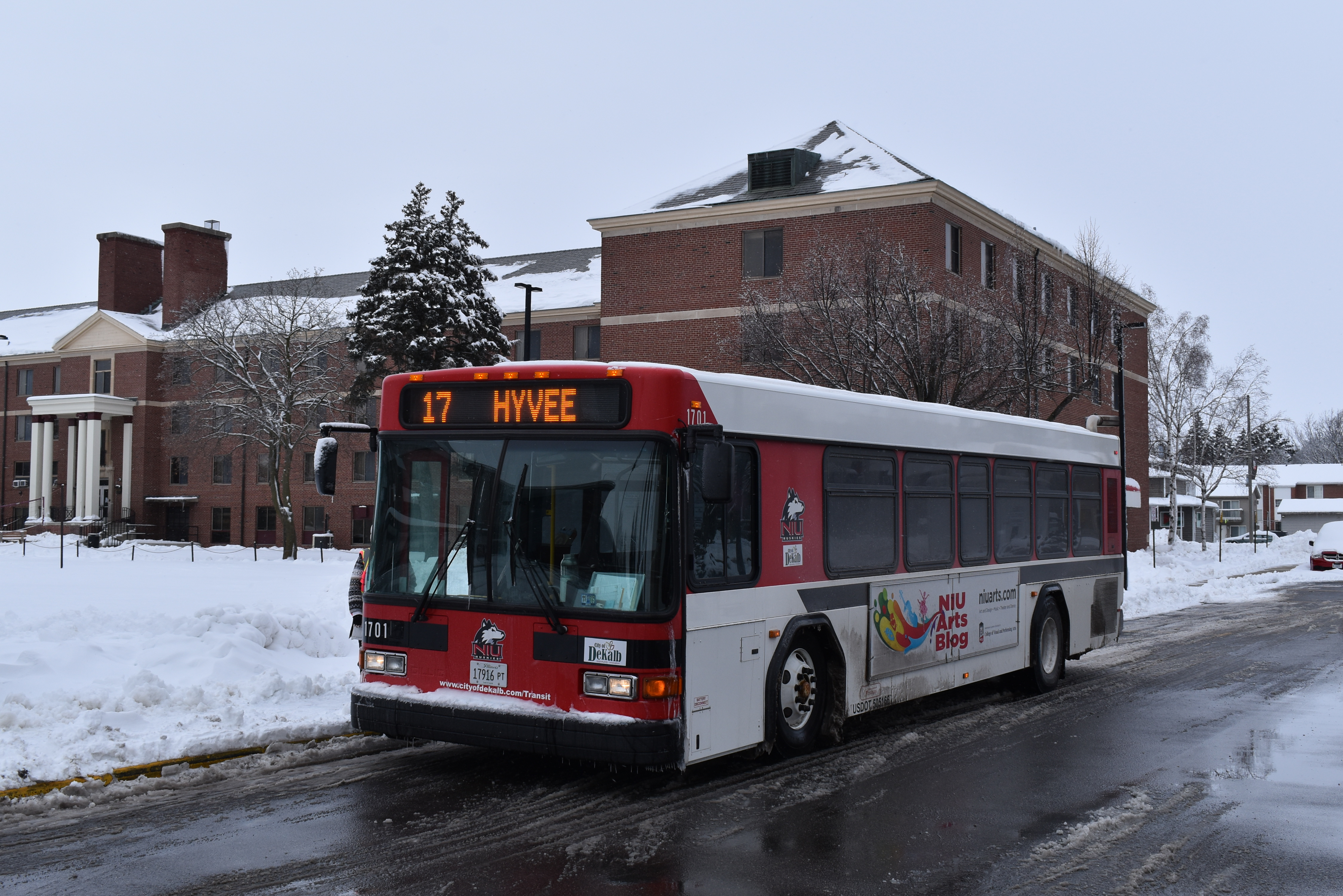
- A DeKalb Public Transit bus in January 2024
- Founded: September 13, 1971
- Locale: DeKalb, Illinois
- Service area: DeKalb County, Illinois
- Service type: Bus service, paratransit
- Fleet: 21
- Annual ridership: 825,407 (2023)
- Website: DeKalb Public Transit

DeKalb Public Transit is the primary provider of mass transportation in DeKalb County, Illinois, with routes serving the DeKalb area. As of 2019, the system provided 509,527 rides over 27,393 annual vehicle revenue hours with 21 buses.

== History ==
Public transit in DeKalb began in 1902 with streetcars operated by the DeKalb–Sycamore & Interurban Traction Company. The streetcars were discontinued in 1924 and private bus companies continued operating the transit system in DeKalb until at least 1952.

In 1970, students at Northern Illinois University, who had advocated for a bus system for years, approved a student association referendum to create a transit system with a $7 per semester fee. On September 13, 1971, the Huskie Bus Line began operations with five routes and eleven buses. By 1982, the transit system had become the second largest in the state, with over 3 million rides each year.

Huskie Bus Line merged with the City of DeKalb TransVAC bus system on August 20, 2018 to provide increased service and lower costs. Transit service in DeKalb was severely impacted by the Covid-19 pandemic, resulting in increased cleaning and a mask mandate. The mask mandate was removed in April 2022. In January 2023, the City of DeKalb authorized a study into extending the Metra Union Pacific West Line to DeKalb. This would allow direct service from DeKalb to Ogilvie Transportation Center in Chicago, avoiding a transfer in Elburn to the Route 12 bus.

== Service ==
DeKalb Public Transit operates 15 routes on the Full Service schedule when NIU is in session and 11 routes on the Break Service schedule, when NIU is not in session. Service is provided 24/7 as a result of Route 11 operating overnight to fill the service gap when other routes end. Route 12 provides service to Cortland and Elburn and the Metra Union Pacific West Line at Elburn station.

As of 2022, excepting Route 12 and paratransit, fares are set at $0.50 for adults, $0.25 for students and seniors, and free for children and local college students and staff at Northern Illinois University. The system provided fare free public transit from 2020 until 2022 as a result of the Covid-19 pandemic.

== Transfer points ==
- Holmes Student Center — serves as the primary transfer hub at NIU, serving 10 routes.

== Fixed route ridership ==
The ridership statistics shown here are of fixed route services only and do not include demand response.

== See also ==
- List of bus transit systems in the United States
- Metra Union Pacific West Line
