= Geneva station =

Geneva station may refer to:

- Geneva station (Illinois)
- Geneva station (Montana)
- Genève-Cornavin railway station in Switzerland
