= York Street–Elmhurst station =

Railway station in Illinois, 1902–1957

Coordinates: 41.8845°N 87.9403°W

York Street–Elmhurst

General information
- Location: York Street; Elmhurst, Illinois, U.S.

History
- Opened: August 25, 1902
- Closed: July 3, 1957
- Previous names: South Elmhurst

Services
Preceding station	Chicago Aurora and Elgin Railroad	Following station
Spring Road toward Wheaton	Main Line	Poplar Avenue toward Chicago

York Street was a station on the Chicago Aurora and Elgin Railroad (CA&E) serving Elmhurst, Illinois. Opened on August 25, 1902, as South Elmhurst, it was one of the original stations of the Aurora Elgin and Chicago Railway (AE&C), which became the CA&E. It was significantly rebuilt in 1910, having a brick shelter added to it. Tickets were bought and sold at a nearby confectionery store. The CA&E closed altogether on July 3, 1957.

York Street was the busiest of three CA&E stations in Elmhurst, and was located near a substation. It was the easternmost station for CA&E expresses west of 5th Avenue in Maywood. A bus route serving southern Elmhurst fed into the station, and the Chicago Great Western Railway had a station nearby.

== Works cited ==
- Weller, Peter; Stark, Fred (1999). The Living Legacy of the Chicago Aurora and Elgin. San Francisco: Forum Press. ISBN 0-945213-41-7 – via Internet Archive.
