= West Chicago station =

Commuter rail station in West Chicago, Illinois

West Chicago

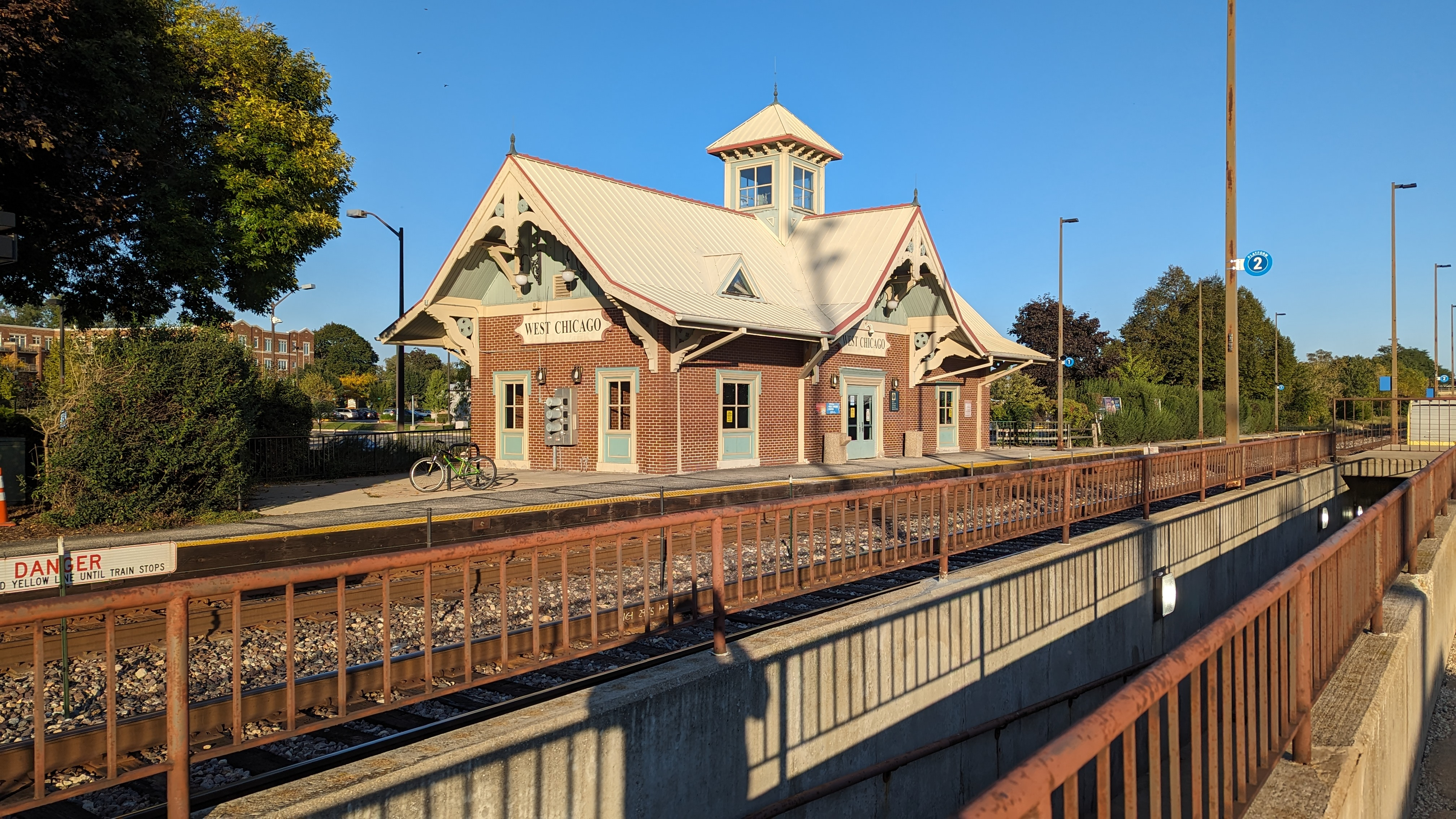
- West Chicago station in October 2023

General information
- Location: 508 West Main Street; West Chicago, Illinois
- Coordinates: 41.8811°N 88.1989°W
- Owner: Union Pacific
- Platforms: 1 side platform, 1 island platform
- Tracks: 3

Construction
- Parking: Yes
- Accessible: Yes

Other information
- Fare zone: 4

History
- Opened: 1912; 114 years ago
- Rebuilt: 1990; 36 years ago

Passengers
- 2018: 586 (average weekday) ▲11.2%
- Rank: 88 out of 236

Services
Preceding station	Metra	Following station
Geneva toward Elburn	Union Pacific West	Winfield toward Ogilvie TC
Former services
Preceding station	Chicago and North Western Railway	Following station
Geneva toward Omaha	Main Line	Wheaton toward Chicago
Geneva Terminus	Galena Division	Winfield toward Chicago
Wayne toward Freeport	Freeport Branch	Terminus
Track layout
Location

West Chicago is a station on Metra's Union Pacific West Line, located in West Chicago, Illinois. The station is 29.7 miles (47.8 km) away from Ogilvie Transportation Center, the eastern terminus of the West Line. In Metra's zone-based fare system, West Chicago is in zone 4. As of 2018, West Chicago is the 88th busiest of the 236 non-downtown stations in the Metra system, with an average of 586 weekday boardings. Unless otherwise announced, inbound trains use the north (side) platform and outbound trains use the south (island) platform.

As of September 8, 2025, West Chicago is served by 51 trains (26 inbound, 25 outbound) on weekdays, by all 20 trains (10 in each direction) on Saturdays, and by all 18 trains (nine in each direction) on Sundays and holidays. One inbound train originates at West Chicago on weekdays.

West Chicago station lies south of the West Chicago City Hall and next to the Wilson Avenue Bridge. It is located at ground level and consists of two platforms and three tracks. Two tracks separate the side and island platforms, and one track lies south of the island platform. The island platform is accessed via a tunnel between the parking lot and the tracks. There is an unstaffed station house at the north side of the station, with a waiting room that is open from 5 a.m. to 12 p.m.

== History ==
The original West Chicago station served the main line of the Galena and Chicago Union Railroad which never reached its western terminus before being acquired by the Chicago and North Western Railway (C&NW) in 1864. The line became part of Metra during the 1980s, while C&NW's successor.

In 1988, the West Chicago City Council announced plans to build a new commuter train station to replace a waiting room leased by the rail company at the West Chicago Community Center.

Metra budgeted $1.69 million for projects including the station building, new lighting, track drainage, and parking spaces for 200 cars. Metra allocated $235,000 of that funding to the station building. According to policy, Metra allocated only enough money to fund a standard commuter station. West Chicago added an extra $25,000 from the city's capital projects fund to alter the modern architectural style to a vintage, 19th-century look.

The station officially opened on July 14, 1990. The opening coincided with the city's annual "Railroad Days" celebration, celebrating West Chicago's heritage as a railroad town.

A new parking lot was opened in 2001 and added more than 170 spots, doubling the commuter parking available at the station. City officials had hoped that expansion would attract more traffic to the train station and bring commercial development to the nearby downtown area. The second lot is located east of the first lot, and started to provide daily parking at $1 per day. The original parking lot was changed to permit parking only.
