= La Fox, Illinois =

- Unincorporated community
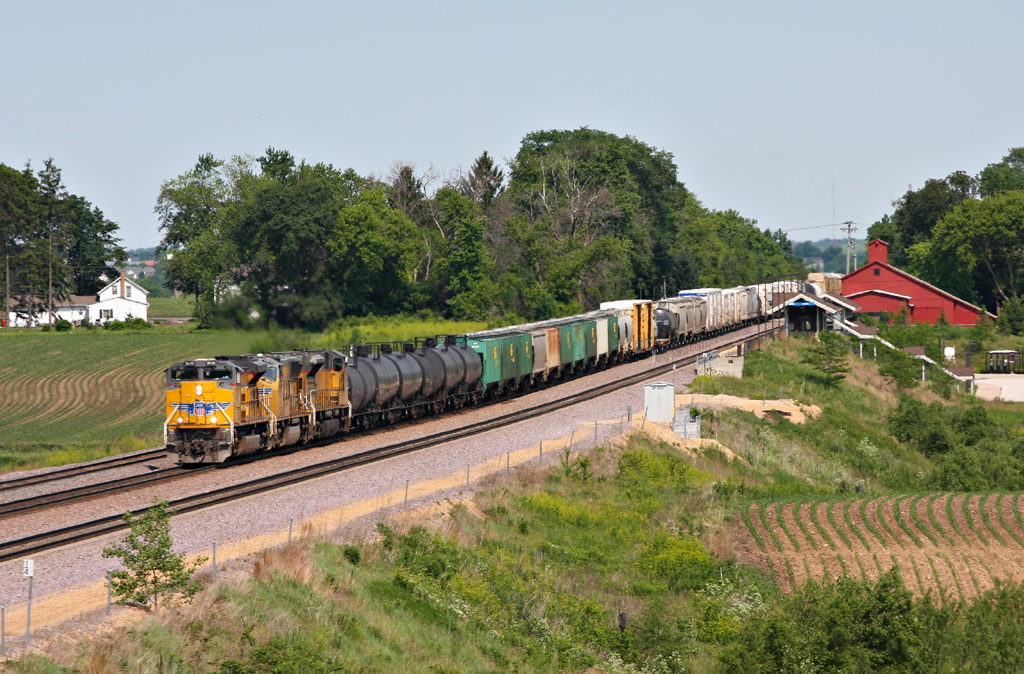
- A Union Pacific Railroad freight train rolls past the La Fox depot and the Potter & Barker grain elevator on June 12, 2011.

- Location within Illinois Location within the United States
- Coordinates: 41°53′11″N 88°24′32″W
- Country: United States
- State: Illinois
- County: Kane
- Township: Blackberry
- Elevation: 804 ft (245 m)
- Time zone: UTC-6 (Central (CST))
  - Summer (DST): UTC-5 (CDT)
- ZIP code: 60147
- Area code: 630
- GNIS feature ID: 411636

La Fox is an unincorporated community in Blackberry Township, Kane County, Illinois, United States. The community is located four miles west of Geneva and five miles east of Elburn. It serves as a station on Metra's Union Pacific West Line.

== History ==
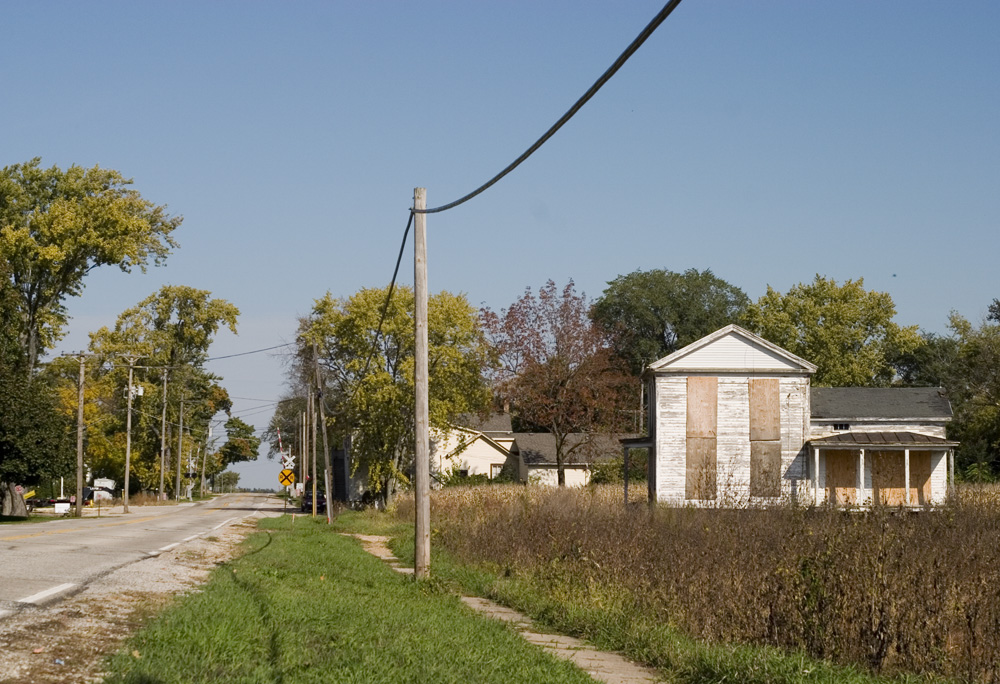

La Fox was established circa 1859 on the Chicago and North Western Transportation Company, which was built through the area in 1854. The community was first named "Kane Station", but was renamed "La Fox" when the post office in present-day Geneva was moved to present-day La Fox. In 1931, the railroad relocated to West Chicago.

In 1994, Kane County declared the twenty-five properties in La Fox to be a preservation district, a designation state statute allows counties to give to areas meeting certain historic criteria. The preservation district has been cited as a nearly intact nineteenth century crossroads town. To emphasize this point, between 1931 and 2000, only eight new buildings were built in La Fox.

Despite this history of minimal development, in 2001, a company sought to build a 1,200-acre residential development near the preservation district. In a push for autonomy and to have greater control over development in the region, La Fox residents attempted to incorporate as a municipality. Patricia Reid Lindner proposed legislation which would allow for a referendum on the matter, similar to an efforts in nearby Virgil, Lily Lake, and Big Rock. The bill was heavily opposed by the company which, along with real estate trade groups, lobbied aggressively against its passage. The bill was voted down 14–8 in the Illinois House of Representatives Local Government Committee. The development did not come to fruition due to the collapse of the residential real estate market.

The Potter and Barker Grain Elevator, built in 1868, was added to the National Register of Historic Places. It is the 73rd addition in Kane County.
