= Potter and Barker Grain Elevator =

- U.S. National Register of Historic Places
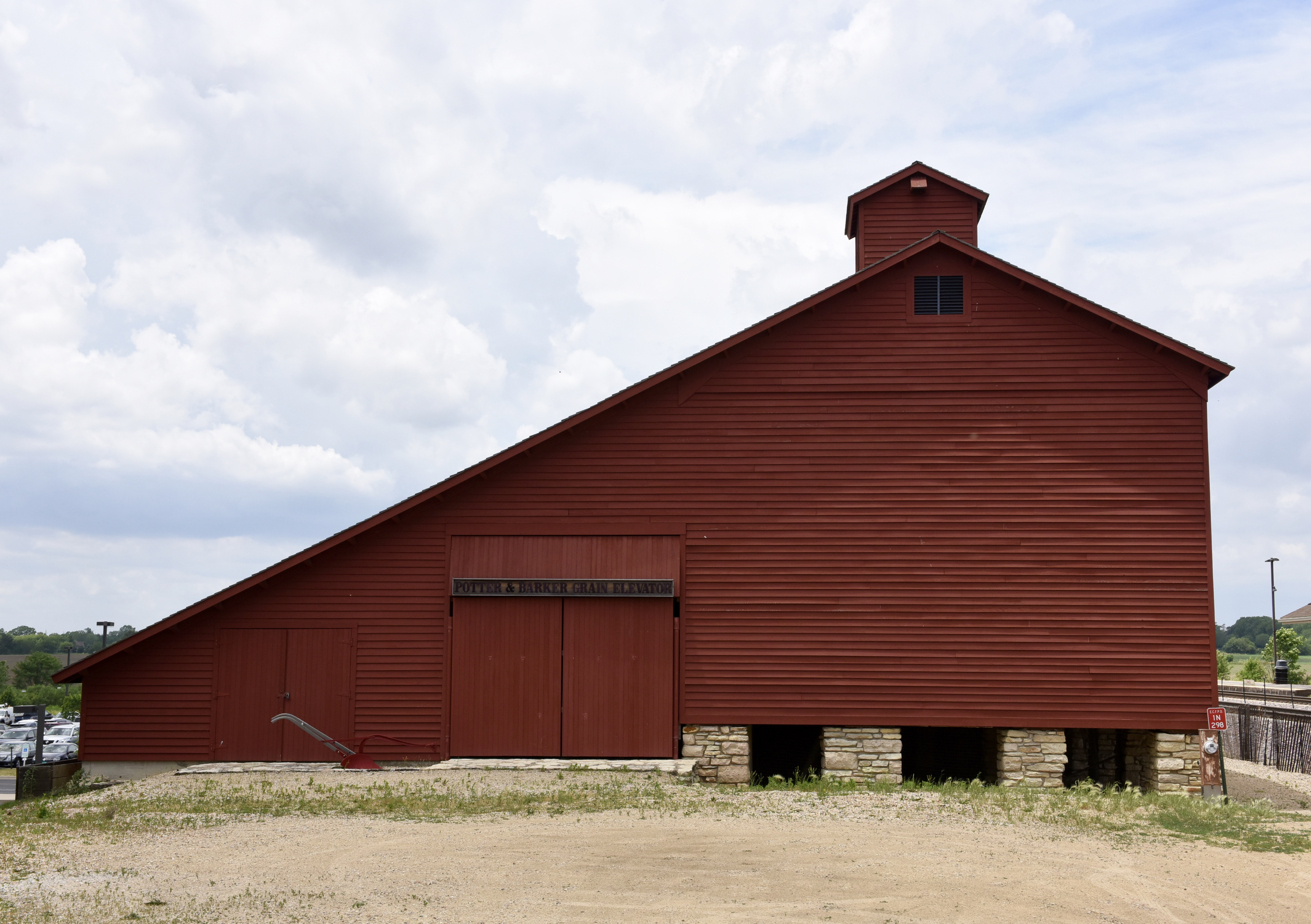

- Location within Illinois Location within the United States
- Location: 1N298 La Fox Rd., La Fox, Illinois
- Coordinates: 41°53′14″N 88°24′34″W
- Built: 1868
- NRHP reference No.: 16000899
- Added to NRHP: December 27, 2016

The Potter and Barker Grain Elevator is a historic grain elevator located at 1N298 La Fox Road in La Fox, Illinois. It is situated next to the La Fox station. The elevator was built in 1868 by former whaling ship captain Lemuel Potter and his brother-in-law Henry Barker. Part of a wave of industrial development in the Fox Valley, it served as a transfer point for grain being shipped along the Galena and Chicago Union Railroad (later the Chicago & Northwestern Railway and now Union Pacific Railroad). The elevator represents an intermediate point in the transition from one-story rural elevators to taller, mechanized second stage elevators. Its small capacity is typical of the older one-story elevators, but it includes mechanized systems of unloading and raising grain common to later structures.

The elevator was added to the National Register of Historic Places on December 27, 2016.
