= La Fox station =

Commuter rail station in La Fox, Illinois

La Fox

- La Fox station in October 2016

General information
- Location: 40 West 999 Keslinger Road; La Fox, Illinois
- Coordinates: 41.8866°N 88.4118°W
- Owner: Metra
- Platforms: 1 side platform, 1 island platform
- Tracks: 3

Construction
- Parking: 300 (2007 count)
- Accessible: Yes

Other information
- Fare zone: 4

History
- Opened: January 23, 2006; 20 years ago

Passengers
- 2018: 295 (average weekday) ▲6.9%
- Rank: 146 out of 236

Services
Preceding station	Metra	Following station
Elburn Terminus	Union Pacific West	Geneva toward Ogilvie TC
Former services
Preceding station	Chicago and North Western Railway	Following station
Elburn toward Omaha	Main Line	Geneva toward Chicago
Track layout
Location

La Fox is the penultimate station on Metra's Union Pacific West Line, located in La Fox, Illinois, an unincorporated area in Kane County, Illinois. The station is 41.1 miles (66.1 km) away from Ogilvie Transportation Center, the eastern terminus of the West Line. In Metra's zone-based fare system, La Fox is in zone 4. As of 2018, La Fox is the 146th busiest of the 236 non-downtown stations in the Metra system, with an average of 295 weekday boardings. Unless otherwise announced, inbound trains use the north (island) platform and outbound trains use the south (side) platform. The northernmost track, despite being adjacent to the island platform, is used exclusively by freight trains.

As of September 8, 2025, La Fox is served by 49 trains (25 inbound, 24 outbound) on weekdays, by all 20 trains (10 in each direction) on Saturdays, and by all 18 trains (nine in each direction) on Sundays and holidays. On weekdays, two inbound trains originate here, and three outbound trains terminate here.

La Fox was originally served by the Chicago and North Western Railway on its main line from Chicago to Omaha, Nebraska. A station was located at the crossing of La Fox Road and the tracks, and closed in 1954.

La Fox station is located at ground level and consists of two platforms, one side, and one island. Three tracks run through the station, and all tracks are served by a platform. There is an unstaffed shelter next to the south track. La Fox has no bus connections. It is next door to the Potter and Barker Grain Elevator.

Inbound Metra trains to Chicago either use the south track or the middle track, depending on the time of day. Outbound Metra trains to Elburn use the south track. During rush hours, out-of-service Metra trains bypass the station on their way to the Elburn rail yard.

La Fox station serves La Fox, Campton Hills, Wasco, Kaneville, and parts of Geneva, Illinois.
