= Wheaton station (Metra) =

Commuter rail station in Wheaton, Illinois

Wheaton

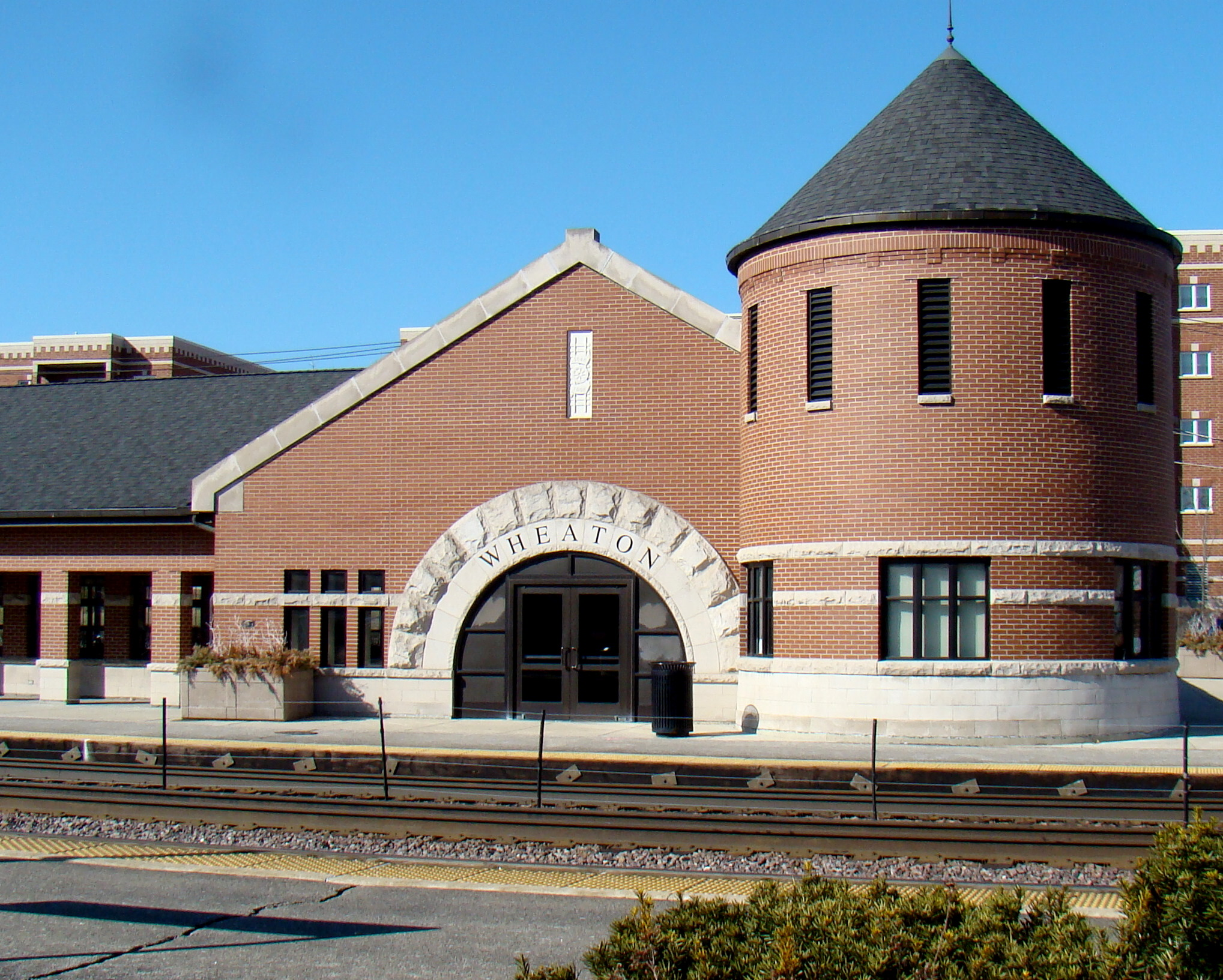
- The station building

General information
- Location: 402 Front Street; Wheaton, Illinois
- Coordinates: 41.8645°N 88.1120°W
- Owner: City of Wheaton
- Platforms: 2 side platforms
- Tracks: 3
- Connections: Pace buses

Construction
- Accessible: Yes

Other information
- Fare zone: 4

History
- Opened: 1887; 139 years ago
- Rebuilt: 1911, 1974 (relocation), 1999

Passengers
- 2018: 1,618 (average weekday) ▲2.6%
- Rank: 19 out of 236

Services
Preceding station	Metra	Following station
Winfield toward Elburn	Union Pacific West	College Avenue toward Ogilvie TC
Former services
Preceding station	Chicago and North Western Railway	Following station
West Chicago toward Omaha	Main Line	Lombard toward Chicago
Winfield toward Geneva	Galena Division	College Avenue toward Chicago
Track layout
Location

Wheaton is one of two stations on Metra's Union Pacific West Line, located in Wheaton, Illinois. The station is located at 402 Front Street. The station is 25.0 miles (40.2 km) away from Ogilvie Transportation Center, the eastern terminus of the West Line. In Metra's zone-based fare system, Wheaton is in zone 4. As of 2018, Wheaton is the 19th busiest of the 236 non-downtown stations in the Metra system, with an average of 1,618 weekday boardings. Unless otherwise announced, inbound trains use the north platform and outbound trains use the south platform.

As of September 8, 2025, Wheaton is served by 55 trains (28 inbound, 27 outbound) on weekdays, by all 20 trains (10 in each direction) on Saturdays, and by all 18 trains (nine in each direction) on Sundays and holidays.

Wheaton station is located at ground level and consists of two side platforms. Three tracks run between the platforms, though one does not access the station. There is a station house next to the north track, which is open 5 AM – 6 PM. Tickets are available at the station house on weekdays.

== History ==
A depot was constructed in 1849 by the Galena and Chicago Union Railroad (G&CU), which later became part of the Chicago and North Western Railway (C&NW). It was situated to the east of Hale Street and south of what was then a single-track railway. Later in 1853, a new and expanded depot was built on the other side of the track. The depot was replaced with a wooden station in 1887. Unlike its predecessor, the 1887 station was located to the west of Main Street. The station house was eventually replaced with a brick structure in 1911, with the platform spanning from Hale to Main streets. The wooden structure is now preserved in Cosley Zoo. The 1911 station remained in operation until 1974, when the C&NW constructed a new, albeit simpler station to the west of West Street (at its present-day location). The present structure was built and opened in July 1999. Until the mid-2010s, platforms were located on both sides of West Street instead of entirely west of the street.

== Bus connections ==
Pace

- 301 Roosevelt Road
- 709 Carol Stream/North Wheaton
- 711 Wheaton/Addison
- 714 College of DuPage/Naperville/Wheaton Connector

== See also ==
- Wheaton station (Chicago Aurora and Elgin Railroad)
