= Elgin station (Chicago Aurora and Elgin Railroad) =

Former interurban station in Elgin, Illinois

Coordinates: 42.0371°N 88.2851°W

Elgin

General information
- Location: 3 East Chicago Street, Elgin, Illinois, United States

History
- Opened: May 23, 1903
- Closed: March 10, 1930 (Elgin and Belvidere); July 3, 1957 (CA&E)

Former services
Preceding station	Chicago Aurora and Elgin Railroad	Following station
Terminus	Elgin Branch	National Street toward Wheaton
Preceding station	Elgin and Belvidere Railway	Following station
Gilberts (Note: In addition to the regular stops on its route, the Elgin and Belvidere picked up hailing passengers from "any of the principal highway crossings along the line", the nearest one to the Elgin station being at Wing Park.) toward Belvidere	Main Line	Terminus

Elgin was a station on the Chicago Aurora and Elgin Railroad, where it was the western terminus of the Elgin branch. Throughout the early 20th century, it also connected with the Elgin and Belvidere Railway and Aurora, Elgin and Fox River Electric Company (AE&FRE) interurbans.

== History ==
Elgin was opened by the Aurora, Elgin and Chicago Railway (AE&C) on May 23, 1903. The AE&C became bankrupt in 1919, and was split into two divisions – the Chicago Aurora and Elgin Railroad (CA&E) to handle interurban affairs, and the Aurora, Elgin and Fox River Electric Company (AE&FRE) to deal with the Fox River Valley, in 1921.

By 1914, the Elgin and Belvidere Railway connected with the AE&C and the future AE&FRE at the Elgin station. The Elgin and Belvidere was powered by 600V direct current overhead wires and received its power from the AE&C. Elgin and Belvidere stations were maintained jointly by the railway and the lines it connected with, and schedules between the lines were closely coordinated to create "practically a through service to from points north and west of Belvidere to Chicago, and all points on the [AE&C]." The Elgin and Belvidere, having consolidated to form the Elgin, Belvidere and Rockford Railway in 1927, ceased operations at 1 a.m. on March 10, 1930; notice of the service's discontinuation was posted at the Elgin station.

Long struggling, the CA&E discontinued passenger service at midday on July 3, 1957. Passengers who had taken the morning trains to Chicago were caught unaware by this development and had to find alternative transportation home.

== Works cited ==
- Bolton, T. C.; Lang, E. C.; Turner, J. W. (1914). A 1200 Volt System for Elgin and Belvidere, Ry. Chicago: Armour Institute of Technology – via Internet Archive.
- Weller, Peter; Stark, Fred (1999). The Living Legacy of the Chicago Aurora and Elgin. San Francisco: Forum Press. ISBN 0-945213-41-7 – via Internet Archive.
