= Union Pacific West Line =

Metra rail commuter service in the Chicago area

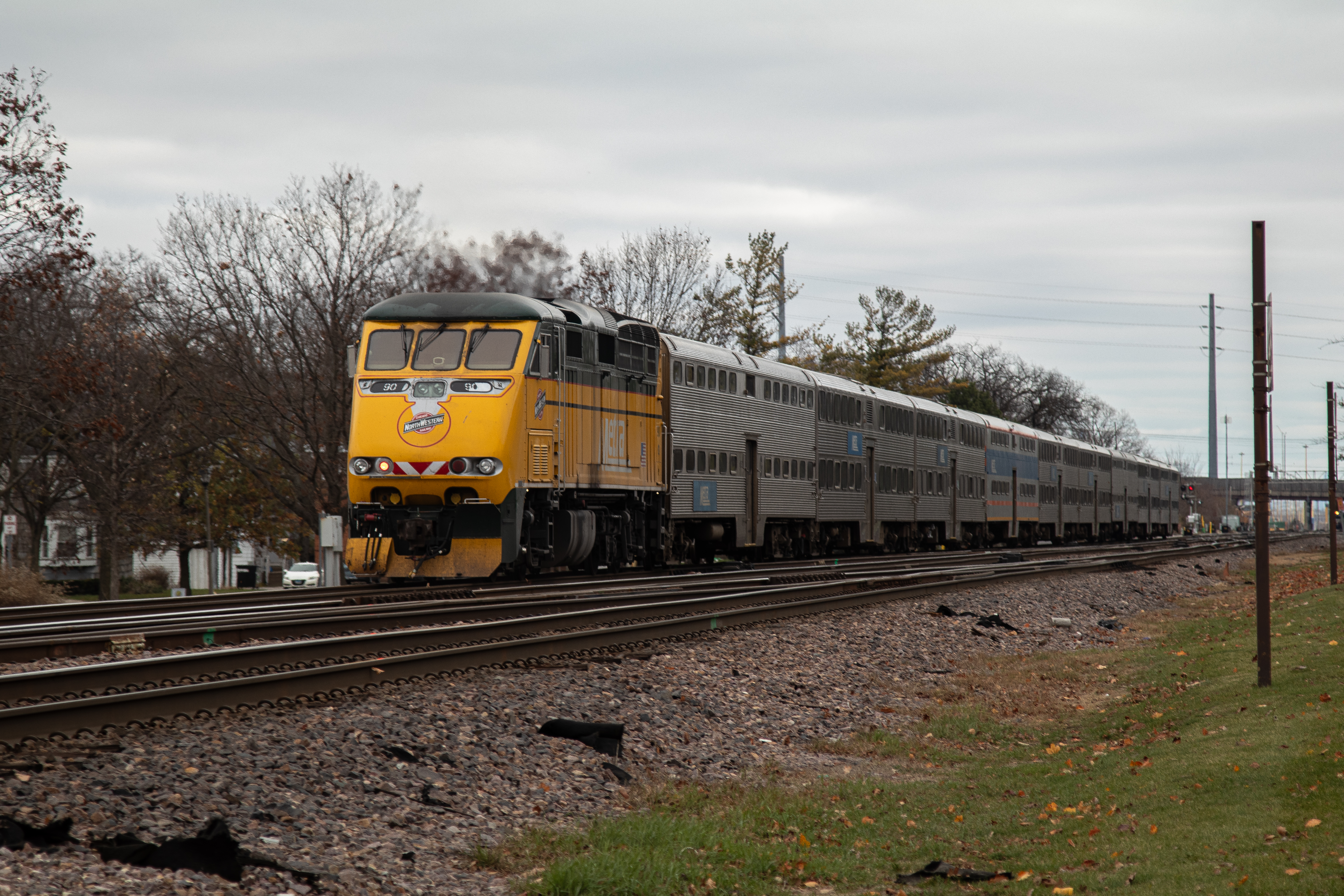
- A Metra train east of Elmhurst station

Overview
- Owner: Union Pacific Railroad (tracks and dispatching)
- Termini: Ogilvie Transportation Center; Elburn
- Stations: 19
- Website: metra.com/train-lines/up-w

Service
- Type: Commuter rail
- System: Metra
- Operator: Metra
- Daily ridership: 27,196 (avg. weekday 2014)
- Ridership: 4,037,778 (2025)

Technical
- Line length: 43.8 miles
- Number of tracks: 3
- Track gauge: 4 ft 8 1/2 in (1,435 mm) standard gauge
Route map
Union Pacific West Line highlighted in pink
Key
- Mileage source All stations are accessible except Kedzie and River Forest.

The Union Pacific West Line (UP-W) is a commuter rail line operated by Metra in the Chicago metropolitan area. The line runs from the Ogilvie Transportation Center in downtown Chicago to Elburn, Illinois. Until its extension in 2006, the UP-W terminated in Geneva, Illinois. Since May 2025, the service is operated directly by Metra. Previously, it was operated by the Union Pacific Railroad (UP) under a purchase-of-service agreement. UP continues to own the tracks and manage dispatching as part of its Geneva Subdivision.

The line was previously owned and operated by the Chicago & North Western Railway (C&NW), until it merged with UP in 1995. Metra does not refer to its lines by particular colors, but the timetable accents for the Union Pacific West line are "Kate Shelley Rose" pink, honoring an Iowa woman who saved a Chicago & North Western Railway train from disaster in 1881. Therefore, the UP-W is the only Metra line that uses a color to honor a person instead of a fallen flag railroad.

== History ==
This is the oldest railway route built from Chicago, the route of the Galena and Chicago Union Railroad along Kinzie Street.

Until the late 1940s the line had a branch to Freeport, Illinois. It diverged from the main line at West Chicago and had stations at Elgin, Marengo, Belvidere, Rockford, Freeport, and other communities. The line was once known as the Chicago & North Western/West Line until UP took over the C&NW in 1995.

All Metra trains on this line terminated at Geneva until 2006, when the line was extended to Elburn, its present terminus. The line runs as part of the Union Pacific Railroad's Geneva Subdivision (ex-C&NW line to Clinton, Iowa).

== Service ==
As of February 16, 2024, Metra operates 58 trains (29 in each direction) on the Union Pacific West Line on weekdays. Of these, 23 inbound trains originate from Elburn, two from La Fox, three from Geneva, and one from West Chicago. Two outbound trains terminate at Geneva, three at La Fox, and the remaining 24 terminate at Elburn.

On weekends, all trains run the full route to Elburn, with Metra operating 10 roundtrip trains on Saturday and nine on Sundays and holidays.

Union Pacific is building a third track from West Chicago through all of Geneva. The project started in September 2022 and is expected to be finished in July 2024. The improvements are designed to ensure smoother traffic flow and reduce conflicts between commuter and freight trains.

Beginning in 2023, the Union Pacific Railroad announced that commuter operations on all three of the Union Pacific lines would be transferred to Metra; the Union Pacific would continue to own and maintain the right-of-way. The transfer was initially expected to occur by Q1 2024; however, it was delayed by a year to May 16, 2025.

There have been ongoing efforts to extend the UP-W to DeKalb, Illinois, which is home to Northern Illinois University (NIU). DeKalb is located outside the service area of the Regional Transportation Authority (RTA), Metra's oversight body. The most recent completed feasibility study was presented to the DeKalb City Council in May 2023. In November 2024, the Illinois Department of Transportation (IDOT) provided the City a grant to conduct further studies. Federal funds for additional studies were announced by U.S. Representative Lauren Underwood in April 2026. In the meantime, DeKalb Public Transit operates its Route 12 to the Elburn station and has seen significant ridership increases.

== Ridership ==
Since 2014 annual ridership has declined from 8,423,188 to 7,883,185, an overall decline of 6.4%. Due to the COVID-19 pandemic, ridership dropped to 1,945,886 passengers in 2020 and to 1,486,536 passengers in 2021. The line's 4,037,778 riders in 2025 made it the fourth busiest Metra line.

== Station stops ==
County	Zone	Location	Station	Connections and notes
Kane	4	Elburn	Elburn	DeKalb Public Transit: 12
Kane	4	La Fox	La Fox	
Kane		St. Charles	St. Charles	St. Charles branch
Kane	4	Geneva	Geneva	Pace: 801, 802
DuPage	4	West Chicago	West Chicago	
DuPage	4	Winfield	Winfield	
DuPage	4	Wheaton	Wheaton	Pace: 301, 711, 714
DuPage	4	Wheaton	College Avenue	Pace: 714
DuPage	4	Glen Ellyn	Glen Ellyn	Pace: 715
DuPage	3	Lombard	Lombard	
DuPage	3	Villa Park	Villa Park	
DuPage	3	Elmhurst	Elmhurst	Pace: 309, 332
Cook	2	Berkeley	Berkeley	Formerly named Proviso
Cook	2	Bellwood	Bellwood	Pace: 313, 330
Cook	2	Melrose Park	Melrose Park	Pace: 303, 309, 313
Cook	2	Maywood	Maywood	Pace: 309, 313, 331
Cook	2	River Forest	River Forest	Pace: 309, 313
Cook	2	River Forest	Lathrop	Closed December 1, 1958
Cook	2	Oak Park	Oak Park	Chicago "L": Green (at Harlem/Lake); CTA buses: 90; Pace: 307, 309, 313, 318, 770
Cook		Oak Park	Avenue	Closed December 1, 1958
Cook		Oak Park	Ridgeland	Closed December 1, 1958
Cook		Oak Park	Austin Boulevard	Closed December 1, 1958
Cook		Chicago	Austin	Closed December 1, 1958
Cook		Chicago	Keeler	Employee only stop, serves adjacent maintenance facility
Cook	2	Chicago	Kedzie	Chicago "L": Green (at Kedzie); CTA buses: 52
Cook	1	Chicago	Ogilvie; Transportation; Center	Metra: Union Pacific Northwest, Union Pacific North; Chicago "L": Green Pink (at Clinton); CTA buses: J14 19 56 60 120 124 125 126 128 130 157 192

=== Freeport Branch ===
This branch line ran from West Chicago to Freeport, Illinois. Service was discontinued in the late 1940s. Metra is planning to revive service from Big Timber Road to Rockford on the Milwaukee District West Line, but there are no plans to restore passenger service elsewhere on the former Freeport branch.

County	Location	Station	Connections
Stephenson	Freeport	Freeport	Illinois Central trains
Stephenson	Ridott	Ridott	
Winnebago	Pecatonica	Pecatonica	
Winnebago	Winnebago	Winnebago	
Winnebago	Rockford	Rockford	KD Line
Winnebago	Rockford	East Rockford	
Winnebago	Cherry Valley	Cherry Valley	
Boone	Belvidere	Belvidere	Trains to Spring Valley and Janesville
Boone	Garden Prairie	Garden Prairie	
McHenry	Marengo	Marengo	
McHenry	Union	Union	Illinois Railway Museum
McHenry	Huntley	Huntley	
Kane	Gilberts	Gilberts	
Kane	Elgin	Elgin (West Side)	Trains to Crystal Lake, Milwaukee Road trains
Kane	South Elgin	South Elgin	
DuPage	Wayne	Wayne	
