= Wheaton station (Chicago Aurora and Elgin Railroad) =

Former rail station in Wheaton, Illinois

Wheaton
- Current site of Wheaton station in 2026; the station's baluster (right) is preserved as a signpost.

General information
- Location: Main Street and Liberty Drive, Wheaton, Illinois, United States

History
- Opened: August 25, 1902
- Closed: July 3, 1957

Former services
Preceding station	Chicago Aurora and Elgin Railroad	Following station
Terminus	Main Line	College Avenue toward Chicago
Wesley Street toward Elgin	Elgin Branch	Terminus
Chicago Avenue toward Aurora	Aurora Branch	Terminus

Wheaton, located in Wheaton, Illinois, was the western terminus of the Chicago Aurora and Elgin Railroad's main line, after which it split into two branches bound for Aurora and Elgin. It opened in 1902 alongside the rest of what was then called the "Aurora Elgin and Chicago Railroad" (AE&C), which at the time only extended eastward to 52nd Avenue in Chicago.

== History ==
The right of way acquired by the AE&C ended up paralleling that of the Chicago and North Western Railway (C&NW, the modern-day Union Pacific West Line), and it was decided to construct its Wheaton station adjacent to the C&NW's station. The AE&C, including Wheaton station, opened on August 25, 1902. The Elgin branch of the AE&C opened in 1903.

The AE&C quickly grew and the station was expanded in 1911. The AE&C became the CA&E in the 1920s.

=== Closure and demolition ===
Having been rendered unprofitable by developments in the 1950s, the CA&E closed passenger service on the afternoon of July 3, 1957. The railroad decided to rent out its stations afterwards; Wheaton was leased to the DuPage County Democratic Party, whose headquarters it served. It was later demolished.

== Station details ==
The 1911 station was designed by H. R. Wilson and Company. Radiators were placed in each corner of the station house during the winter to warm it up to 75 °F (24 °C). Between 1903 and 1914, trains left Chicago alternating between Aurora and Elgin; afterwards, trains proceeded west to Wheaton, where they were split with the front halves going to Aurora and the rear halves going to Elgin.
