= Elburn, Illinois =

Elburn
- Village
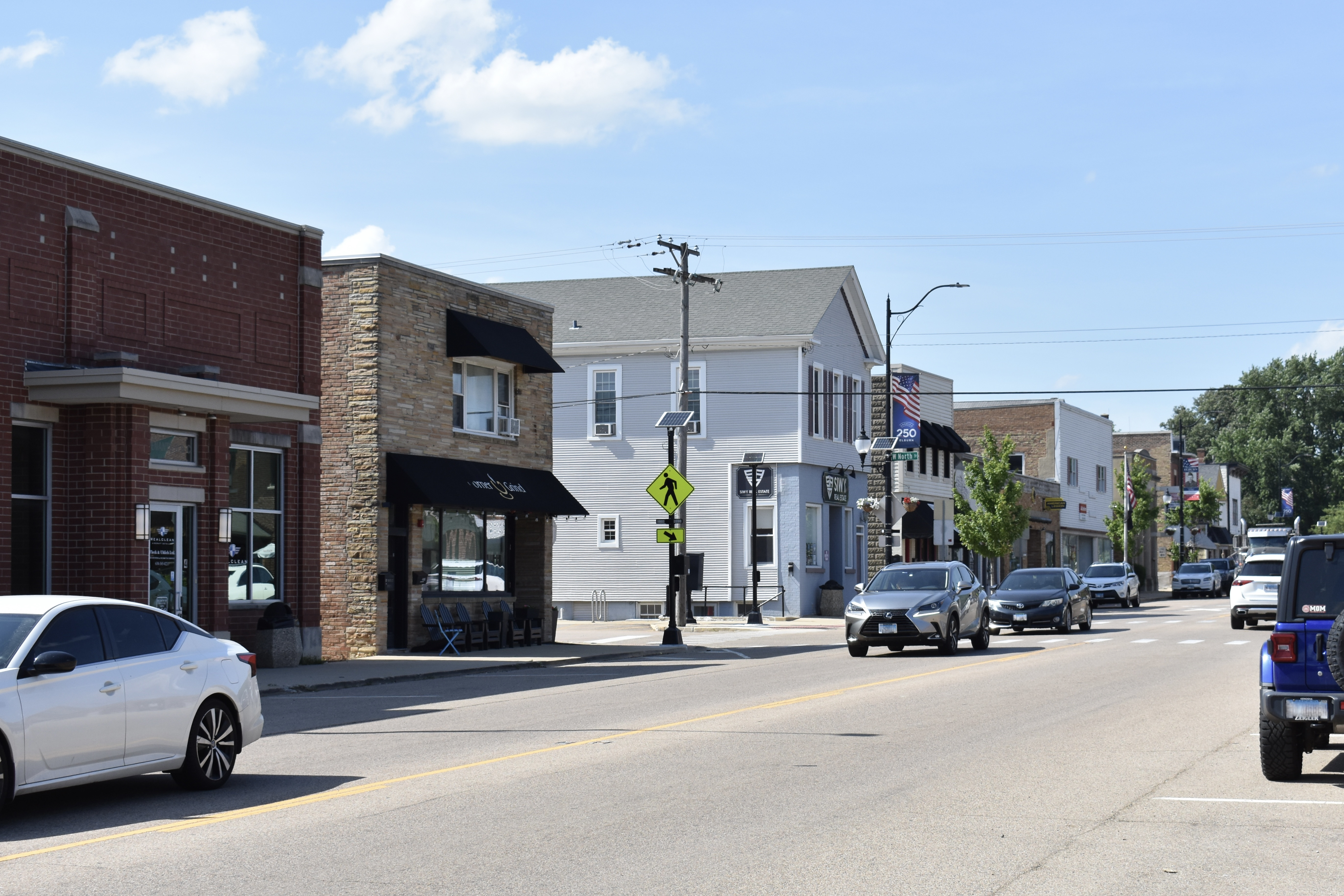
- Elburn in July 2026

- Flag

- Location of Elburn in Kane County, Illinois.

- Location of Illinois in the United States
- Coordinates: 41°52′46″N 88°27′25″W
- Country: United States
- State: Illinois
- County: Kane
- Township: Blackberry, Campton, Kaneville, St. Charles

Government
  - Mayor: Jeffrey D. Walter

Area
  - Total: 3.73 sq mi (9.66 km^{2})
  - Land: 3.73 sq mi (9.66 km^{2})
  - Water: 0 sq mi (0.00 km^{2})
- Elevation: 814 ft (248 m)

Population (2020)
  - Total: 6,175
  - Density: 1,655.9/sq mi (639.34/km^{2})
- Time zone: UTC-6 (CST)
  - Summer (DST): UTC-5 (CDT)
- ZIP Code(s): 60119
- Area code: 630/331
- GNIS feature ID: 2398795
- FIPS code: 17-22931
- Website: www.elburn.gov

Elburn is a village in Kane County, Illinois, United States. The population was 6,175 as of the 2020 census, up from 5,602 at the 2010 census.

== History ==
On May 2, 1834, William Lance arrived in the Elburn area and soon built a home there. Shortly thereafter, a man named Henry Warne arrived and opened a stagecoach inn called the Halfway House, since it was halfway between Oregon, Illinois and Chicago.

When the Chicago and North Western Transportation Company built through the area in 1854, the stop at this site was named Blackberry Station after the Township. The village incorporated as Elburn in 1886.

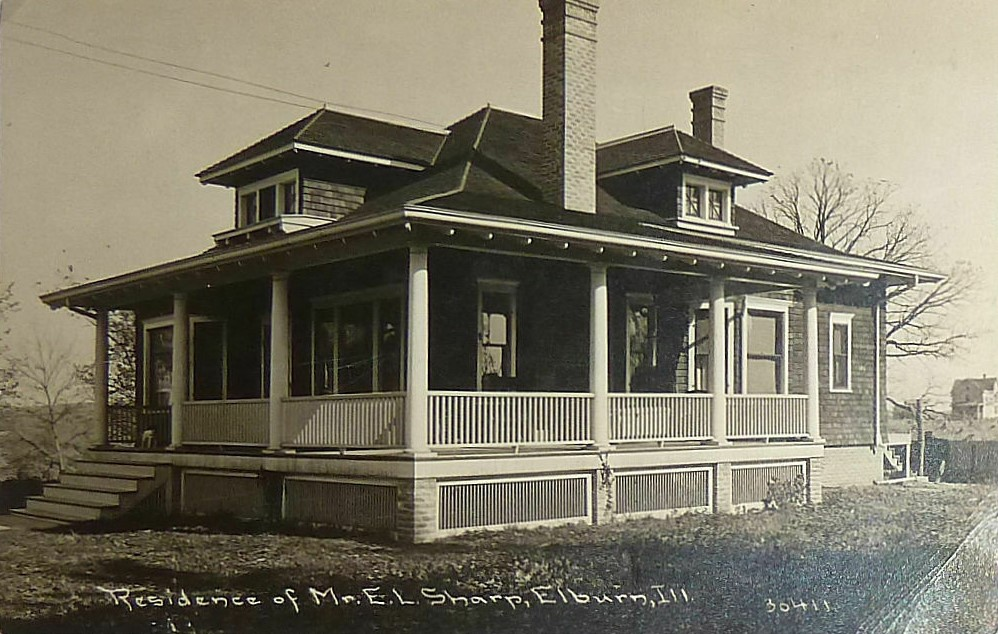
A c. 1920 postcard showed 401 N. Main Street, Elburn, Illinois.

The village was originally named Blackberry Station but was changed at the request of the railroad. The name Elburn itself derives from its originally suggested name, Melbourne, but a suggestion to shorten the name resulted in the dropping of the "M", leaving Elbourne. From there, it was shortened even further to Elburne, and then finally to Elburn.

Once largely rural, the area's population began rapidly expanding in the 1990s with the arrival of large tract home developments. In January 2006, Metra began to provide passenger rail service from Elburn to Chicago on the Union Pacific West Line. The new station replaced Geneva as the western end-of-line and made Elburn one of Chicago's farthest western suburbs. A new station was also constructed in La Fox.

== Geography ==
According to the 2021 census gazetteer files, Elburn has a total area of 3.73 square miles (9.66 km^{2}), all land.

Neighboring cities include Batavia, Geneva, and St. Charles (referred to, as a group, as the Tri-Cities). Campton Hills also borders Elburn, and Aurora, Elgin and DeKalb (home of Northern Illinois University) are nearby as well. La Fox is on the east. Lily Lake is on the north. Kaneville is on the south. And Maple Park is on the west.

== Demographics ==
Historical population
Census	Pop.	Note	%±
1890	584		—
1900	606		3.8%
1910	613		1.2%
1920	571		−6.9%
1930	548		−4.0%
1940	624		13.9%
1950	792		26.9%
1960	960		21.2%
1970	1,122		16.9%
1980	1,224		9.1%
1990	1,275		4.2%
2000	2,756		116.2%
2010	5,602		103.3%
2020	6,175		10.2%
U.S. Decennial Census

=== Racial and ethnic composition ===
Elburn village, Illinois – Racial and ethnic composition Note: the US Census treats Hispanic/Latino as an ethnic category. This table excludes Latinos from the racial categories and assigns them to a separate category. Hispanics/Latinos may be of any race.
Race / Ethnicity (NH = Non-Hispanic)	Pop 2000	Pop 2010	Pop 2020	% 2000	% 2010	% 2020
White alone (NH)	2,664	4,986	5,324	96.66%	89.00%	86.22%
Black or African American alone (NH)	3	27	50	0.11%	0.48%	0.81%
Native American or Alaska Native alone (NH)	4	5	0	0.15%	0.09%	0.00%
Asian alone (NH)	9	176	119	0.33%	3.14%	1.93%
Native Hawaiian or Pacific Islander alone (NH)	0	0	0	0.00%	0.00%	0.00%
Other race alone (NH)	1	2	7	0.04%	0.04%	0.11%
Mixed race or Multiracial (NH)	16	40	196	0.58%	0.71%	3.17%
Hispanic or Latino (any race)	59	366	479	2.14%	6.53%	7.76%
Total	2,756	5,602	6,175	100.00%	100.00%	100.00%

=== 2020 census ===
As of the 2020 census, Elburn had a population of 6,175. The median age was 37.4 years. 27.5% of residents were under the age of 18 and 11.7% of residents were 65 years of age or older. For every 100 females there were 97.4 males, and for every 100 females age 18 and over there were 97.0 males age 18 and over.

96.3% of residents lived in urban areas, while 3.7% lived in rural areas.

There were 2,170 households in Elburn, of which 40.5% had children under the age of 18 living in them. Of all households, 64.4% were married-couple households, 10.9% were households with a male householder and no spouse or partner present, and 20.1% were households with a female householder and no spouse or partner present. About 17.9% of all households were made up of individuals and 8.1% had someone living alone who was 65 years of age or older.

There were 2,243 housing units, of which 3.3% were vacant. The homeowner vacancy rate was 1.7% and the rental vacancy rate was 1.2%.

=== Income and poverty ===
The median income for a household in the village was $95,717, and the median income for a family was $108,849. Males had a median income of $86,185 versus $43,186 for females. The per capita income for the village was $39,148. About 0.0% of families and 4.6% of the population were below the poverty line, including 5.1% of those under age 18 and 0.0% of those age 65 or over.

== Transportation ==
Elburn is located at the intersection of Illinois Route 38 and Route 47. It receives frequent commuter rail service from its Metra station at the end of the Union Pacific West Line.
