= Geneva station (Illinois) =

Commuter rail station in Geneva, Illinois

Geneva

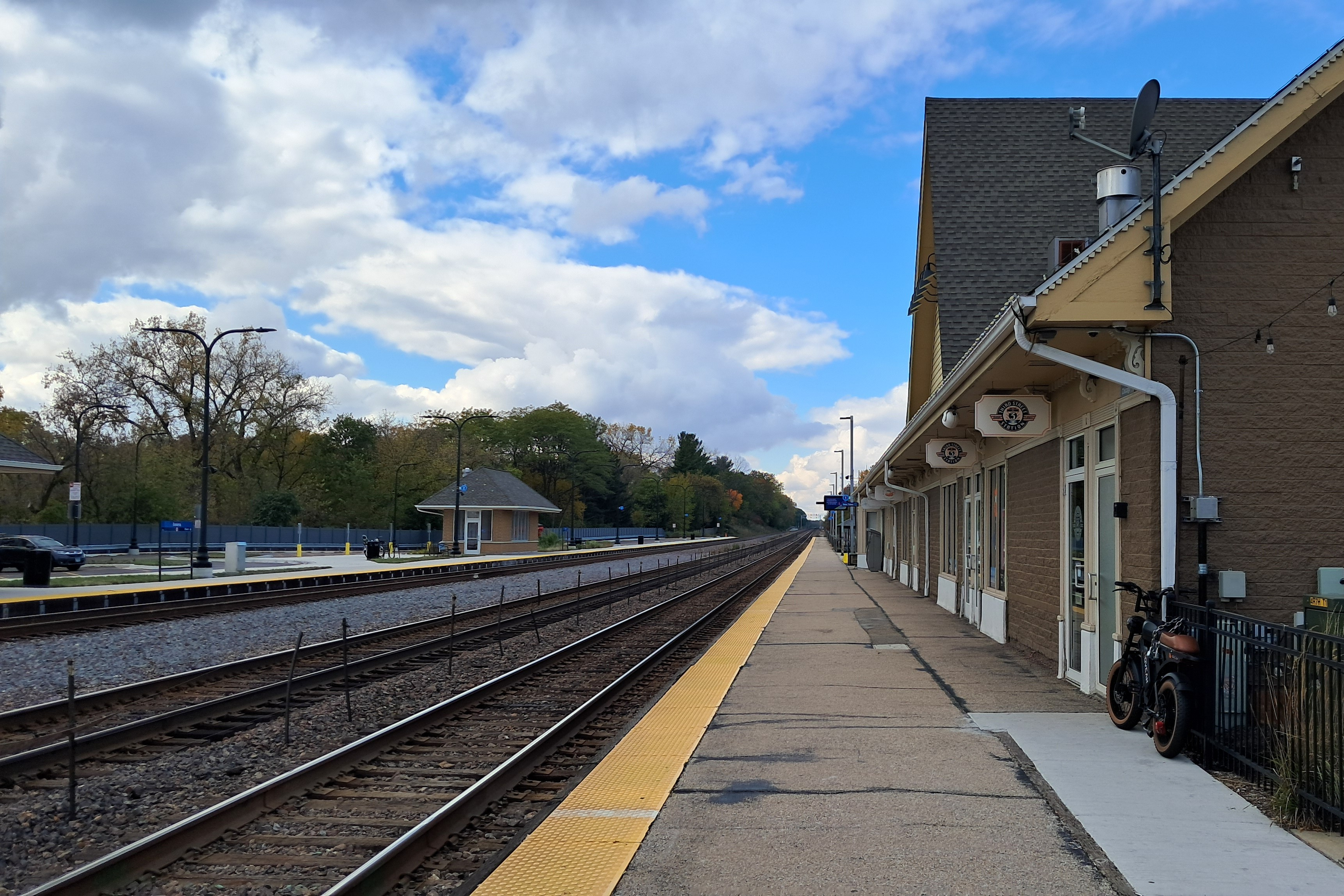
- Geneva station platforms, November 2025

General information
- Location: 328 Crescent Place; Geneva, Illinois
- Coordinates: 41.8817°N 88.3100°W
- Owner: City of Geneva
- Platforms: 2 side platforms
- Tracks: 3
- Connections: Pace bus

Construction
- Accessible: Yes

Other information
- Fare zone: 4

History
- Opened: 1882; 144 years ago
- Rebuilt: 1931; 95 years ago, 1988; 38 years ago 2022–2025

Passengers
- 2018: 1,742 (average weekday) ▲2%
- Rank: 14 out of 236

Services
Preceding station	Metra	Following station
La Fox toward Elburn	Union Pacific West	West Chicago toward Ogilvie TC
Former services
Preceding station	Chicago and North Western Railway	Following station
La Fox toward Omaha	Main Line	West Chicago toward Chicago
through to Branches	Galena Division	West Chicago toward Chicago
St. Charles Closed 1951 Terminus	St. Charles Branch	through to Galena Division
Batavia toward Aurora	Aurora Branch	through to Galena Division
Track layout
Location

Geneva is a Metra commuter railroad station in Geneva, Illinois, served by Metra's Union Pacific West Line. The station is 35.5 miles (57.1 km) away from Ogilvie Transportation Center. In Metra's zone-based fare structure, Geneva is in zone 4. As of 2018, Geneva is the 14th busiest of the 236 non-downtown stations in the Metra system, with an average of 1,742 weekday boardings. Unless otherwise announced, inbound trains use the north platform and outbound trains use the south platform.

As of September 8, 2025, Geneva is served by 56 trains (28 in each direction) on weekdays, by all 20 trains (10 in each direction) on Saturdays, and by all 18 trains (nine in each direction) on Sundays and holidays. On weekdays, three inbound trains originate here, and two outbound trains terminate here.

The station consists of two side platforms and a waiting room, with a ticket agent booth staffed on weekday mornings. Trains go east to Ogilvie Transportation Center in Chicago and west to Elburn, Illinois.

== History ==
Until the line's extension to Elburn on January 23, 2006, Geneva was the western terminus of the Union Pacific West Line, and half of the weekend trains started at West Chicago. Since then, all of those trains were moved to Elburn, leaving all weekend trains to serve Geneva.

Geneva was the last station on the line to not be situated on a triple-tracked section. In 2022, the Union Pacific Railroad began construction on a third track throughout Geneva. Construction was originally slated to conclude in 2024, but the project was completed in 2025. This resulted in the middle track at the station losing access to a platform, and this track is now solely used by Metra trains that do not stop at the station as well as Union Pacific freight trains.

== Bus connections ==
Pace

- 592 St. Charles - Geneva Call-n-Ride
- 596 Batavia Call-n-Ride
- 801 Elgin/Geneva
- 802 Aurora/Geneva via Lake
