= Elburn station =

Commuter rail station in Elburn, Illinois

Elburn

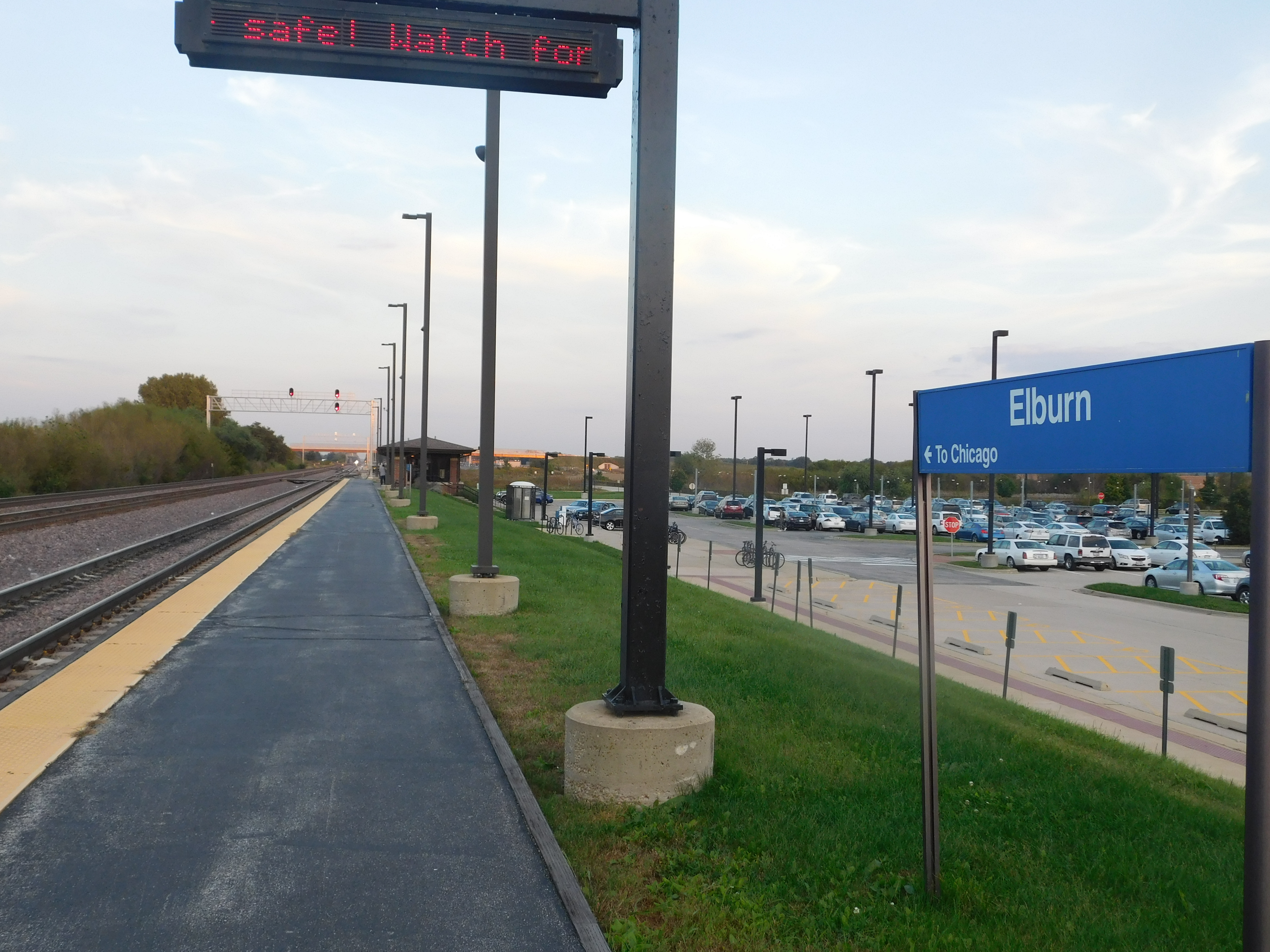
- Elburn station in October 2016

General information
- Location: 422 East Railroad Avenue; Elburn, Illinois 60119
- Coordinates: 41.8906°N 88.4640°W
- Owner: Union Pacific Railroad
- Platforms: 1 side platform
- Tracks: 3
- Connections: Huskie Bus Line

Construction
- Parking: 300 spaces, $1.25 per day
- Accessible: Yes

Other information
- Fare zone: 4

History
- Opened: 1854; 172 years ago (G&CU/C&NW); January 23, 2006; 20 years ago (Metra)
- Closed: 1959; 67 years ago (C&NW)

Passengers
- 2018: 336 (average weekday) ▲9.4%
- Rank: 137 out of 236

Services
Preceding station	Metra	Following station
Terminus	Union Pacific West	La Fox toward Ogilvie TC
Former services
Preceding station	Chicago and North Western Railway	Following station
Maple Park toward Omaha	Main Line	La Fox toward Chicago
Track layout
Location

Elburn is a station on Metra's Union Pacific West Line located in Elburn, Illinois. The station is the western terminus of the West Line. The station is 43.8 miles (70.5 km) away from Ogilvie Transportation Center along the railroad tracks. Elburn station opened on January 23, 2006, when the West Line was extended from Geneva. The station is located at ground level. A large coach yard is located just east of the station. As of 2018, Elburn is the 137th busiest of the 236 non-downtown stations in the Metra system, with an average of 336 weekday boardings.

As of September 8, 2025, Elburn is served by 47 trains (23 inbound, 24 outbound) on weekdays, by all 20 trains (10 in each direction) on Saturdays, and by all 18 trains (nine in each direction) on Sundays and holidays. All Metra trains that operate this far west originate, or terminate, at Elburn.

The first station in Elburn was established in 1854 with the arrival of the Galena and Chicago Union Railroad. This later merged into the Chicago and North Western Railway (C&NW) and was on the Omaha–Chicago main line. The C&NW eventually merged into the Union Pacific Railroad, the current operator of the line, in 1995.

== Transportation ==
Huskie Bus Line

- Elburn Shuttle to NIU in DeKalb
