= St. Joseph Syro Malabar Forane Catholic Church =

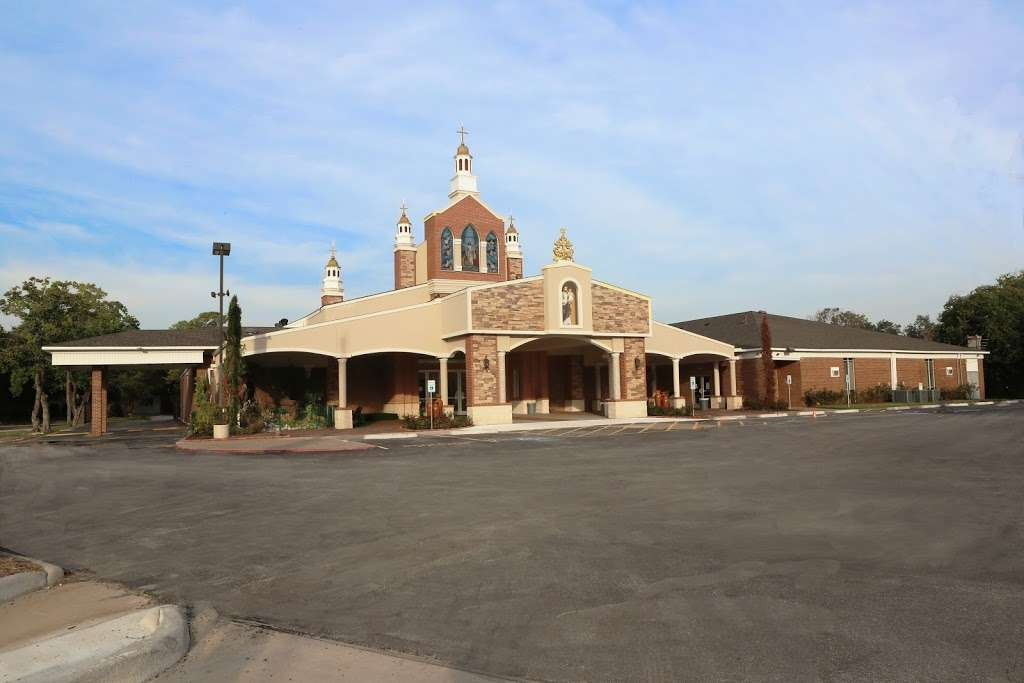

- Location within Texas Location within the United States
- 29°36′49.5″N 95°32′44.0″W
- Location: 211 Present St; Missouri City, Texas
- Country: United States
- Denomination: Syro-Malabar Catholic Church
- Website: stjosephhouston.org

History
- Consecrated: October 18, 2003

Administration
- Diocese: St. Thomas Syro-Malabar Catholic Diocese of Chicago

Clergy
- Bishop: Joy Alappat
- Vicar: Rev. Fr Sebastian Valiyaparambil

The St. Joseph Syro Malabar Forane Catholic Church is a Syro-Malabar Catholic Forane Parish in Missouri City, Texas serving the community of Houston. It is a Forane Parish for the Syro-Malabar Catholic Eparchy of St. Thomas of Chicago.

== Priest ==
The current vicar of the Forane Parish is Reverend Fr. Sebastian Valiyaparambil. Prior to his tenure in Houston, Fr. Sebastian served as the Vicar of St. Chavara Syro-Malabar Catholic Mission in Bakersfield, CA.

== Importance in the Eparchy ==
The Eparchy is the second-largest parish in the eparchy and the largest in the Texas region. Due to its size and importance, It has been granted an assistant vicar. It also hosted the 2019 Syro Malabar National Convention

== Forane Church ==
In April 2014 Mar Jacob Angadiath announced that the Houston Parish would be elevated to a Forane Church, one of the 9 due to the eparchy's geographical vastness and for better co-ordination.

There are three Syro Malabar Churches and Missions under the St. Joseph Forane, Houston.

| No. | Church/Mission Name | City |
|---|---|---|
| 1 | St. Thomas Syro Malabar Church | San Antonio, Texas |
| 2 | Divine Mercy Syro Malabar Church | Edinburg, Texas |
| 3 | St. Mary Syro Malabar Church | Pearland, Texas |

== See also ==
- Syro-Malabar Church
- Syro-Malabar Catholic Eparchy of St. Thomas of Chicago
