= Maywood station =

Maywood station may refer to:

- Maywood station (Illinois), a commuter rail station in suburban Chicago, Illinois
- Maywood Station Museum, a museum and former railway station in Maywood, New Jersey
