= Maywood, Illinois =

- Village
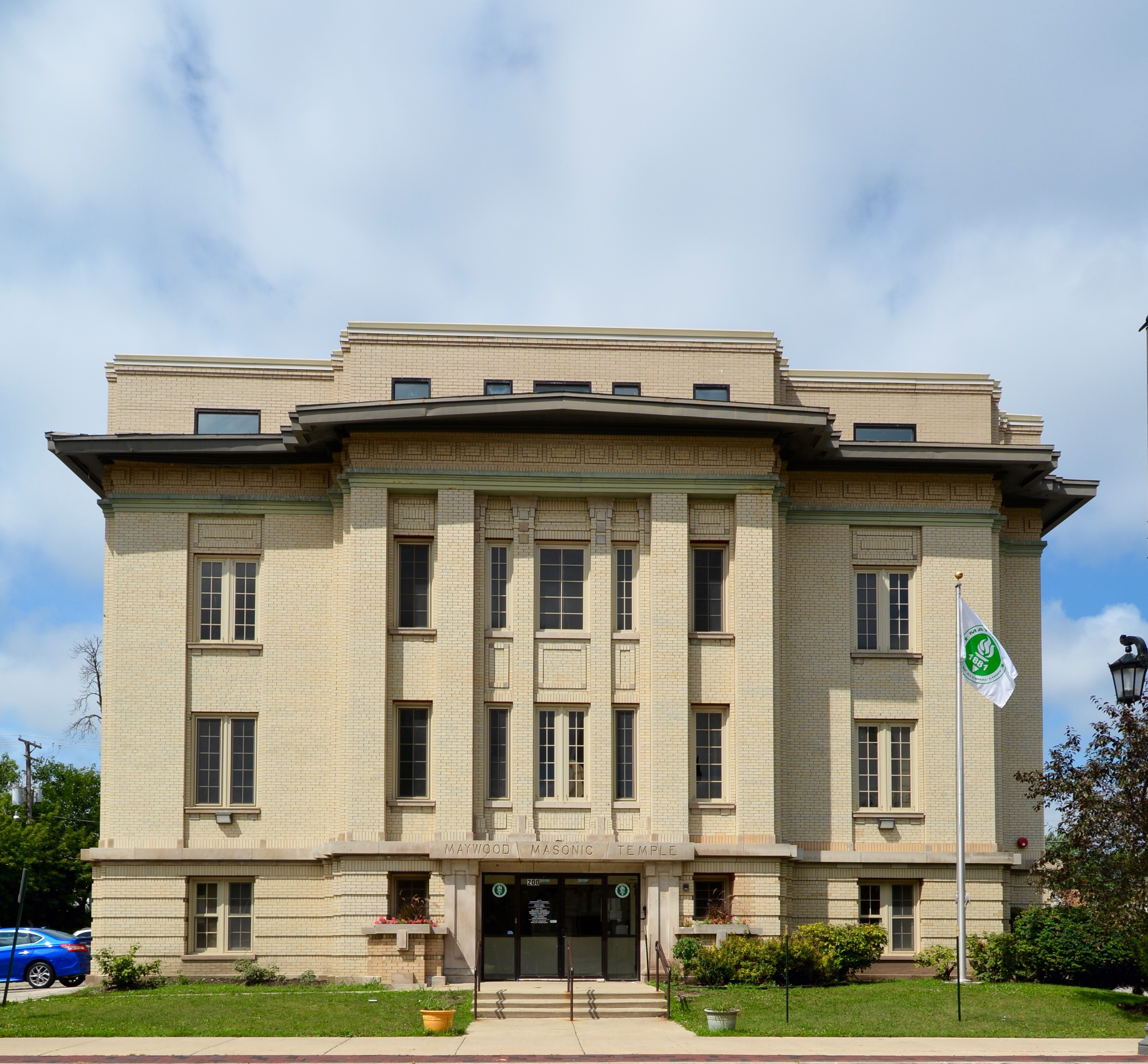
- Masonic Temple

- Flag Seal
- Motto: "Village of Eternal Light"
- Location of Maywood in Cook County, Illinois.

- Location within Greater Chicago Location within Illinois Location within the United States
- Coordinates: 41°52′52″N 87°50′36″W
- Country: United States
- State: Illinois
- County: Cook
- Township: Proviso

Area
  - Total: 2.72 sq mi (7.04 km^{2})
  - Land: 2.72 sq mi (7.04 km^{2})
  - Water: 0 sq mi (0.00 km^{2})

Population (2020)
  - Total: 23,512
  - Density: 8,652/sq mi (3,340.7/km^{2})
- Time zone: UTC−6 (CST)
  - Summer (DST): UTC−5 (CDT)
- ZIP Codes: 60153–60155
- Area codes: 708/464
- FIPS code: 17-47774
- Wikimedia Commons: Maywood, Illinois
- Website: maywood-il.gov

Maywood is a village in Cook County, Illinois, United States, in the Chicago metropolitan area. It was founded on April 6, 1869, and organized October 22, 1881. The population was 23,512 at the 2020 census.

== History ==
There was limited European-American settlement in the Maywood area before a railroad was built after the American Civil War, which stimulated the rise of Chicago. At least one house in what became Maywood is known to have been used as a station on the Underground Railroad, to aid refugee African-American slaves in escaping to freedom in the North. Some settled in the free state of Illinois; others went on to Canada, which had abolished slavery, seeking further distance from slavecatchers. The site of the former house has been nationally commemorated. The plaque is located at today's Lake Street and the Des Plaines River bridge.

This early West Side suburb of Chicago was developed along the oldest railway line that led away from the city. It attracted real estate developers because of its open grass prairie and scattered groves of ancient trees.

In 1868, Vermont businessmen established the Maywood Company. In 1870 it organized the platting of streets, and began construction on the north side of the Chicago Great Western railroad tracks. The company planted 20,000 eight-year-old, nursery-grown trees to enhance the future town. By 2010, the last of these 148-year-old trees had succumbed to the emerald ash borer.

The oldest documented ash tree in northeast Illinois is in Maywood and is dated at 250 years old. It is being protected from the borers with horticultural treatment. The danger is expected to pass locally by year 2020, as it already has in Canton, Michigan, where borers were first seen. The ash is nicknamed "The Great Dane", after Jens Jensen, founder of the Midwest's prairie ecology movement a century ago. The tree is located within old growth woods just behind Proviso East high school.

With settlement underway, the village was founded on October 22, 1881, by Colonel William T. Nichols. He named it after his late daughter, May, and the groves.

Many century-old homes survive here in relatively unaltered condition. Maywood boasts 17 homes and properties listed on the National Register of Historic Places.

At one time two airports operated in Maywood. Loyola University Medical Center was developed on the site of one former airport, at the southwest corner of First Avenue and Roosevelt Road. It was the airfield used by Charles Lindbergh during his days as an airmail pilot.

Checkerboard Field was located at the southeastern corner of that intersection and was a private field. The land has been converted to a forest preserve meadow. There was some apparent consolidation of the fields in later years. Later, an automobile board racetrack was located here, along with a viewing grandstand. Barney Oldfield raced on the track. The Hines Veterans Hospital constructed one of its buildings on the foundation of the former grandstand.

In 2022, the mayor of Maywood, Nathaniel George Booker, was found intoxicated and asleep while occupying the drivers seat with the vehicle turned on on the Kennedy Expressway, in Chicago, Illinois. Multiple 911 calls were made, eliciting a response from the Chicago Police Department, who paged the Chicago Fire Department for medical response, due to his heavily inebriated state. He was arrested for misdemeanor counts of driving under the influence and cited for obstructing drivers on a highway. The Village of Maywood has yet to provide comment as of March 2025, despite bodycam footage of the incident being viewed over 2 million times on YouTube. The Village of Maywood has also yet to confirm if the vehicle involved in the crime, which is similar to those owned by the village for the purpose of personnel transport, is owned by the village.

=== Maywood in World War II ===
Maywood was established as the base for the 33rd Tank Company, Illinois National Guard. The Armory was located on Madison Street, two blocks east of First Avenue. It was organized on May 3, 1929, with the purpose of training men for combat. On November 25, 1940, 122 men of the 33rd Tank Company were inducted into active service to become Company B of the famous 192nd Tank Battalion, which fought in the Philippine islands. Many of these American soldiers were taken prisoner by the Japanese and died in April 1942 on the Bataan Death March. Of the 122 men of Company B, only 41 survived the war to return to Maywood. Their sacrifice has been honored with an annual Bataan Day Parade.

Given such losses, Ian Smith, who headed the history department at Proviso East High School, said that "World War II hit the town of Maywood really hard."

== Geography ==
According to the 2021 census gazetteer files, Maywood has a total area of 2.72 square miles (7.04 km^{2}), all land.

Neighboring villages are Broadview to the south, Forest Park and River Forest to the east, Melrose Park to the north, and Bellwood to the west.

== Demographics ==
Historical population
Census	Pop.	Note	%±
1880	716		—
1900	4,532		—
1910	8,033		77.3%
1920	12,072		50.3%
1930	25,829		114.0%
1940	26,648		3.2%
1950	27,473		3.1%
1960	27,330		−0.5%
1970	29,019		6.2%
1980	27,998		−3.5%
1990	27,139		−3.1%
2000	26,987		−0.6%
2010	24,090		−10.7%
2020	23,512		−2.4%
U.S. Decennial Census; 2010-2020

=== Racial and ethnic composition ===
Maywood village, Illinois – Racial and ethnic composition Note: the US Census treats Hispanic/Latino as an ethnic category. This table excludes Latinos from the racial categories and assigns them to a separate category. Hispanics/Latinos may be of any race.
Race / ethnicity (NH = Non-Hispanic)	Pop 2000	Pop 2010	Pop 2020	% 2000	% 2010	% 2020
White alone (NH)	1,488	891	722	5.51%	3.70%	3.07%
Black or African American alone (NH)	22,208	17,781	14,193	82.29%	73.81%	60.36%
Native American or Alaska Native alone (NH)	31	25	19	0.11%	0.10%	0.08%
Asian alone (NH)	80	118	110	0.30%	0.49%	0.47%
Pacific Islander alone (NH)	1	0	4	0.00%	0.00%	0.02%
Other race alone (NH)	32	20	61	0.12%	0.08%	0.26%
Mixed race or Multiracial (NH)	304	256	401	1.13%	1.06%	1.71%
Hispanic or Latino (any race)	2,843	4,999	8,002	10.53%	20.75%	34.03%
Total	26,987	24,090	23,512	100.00%	100.00%	100.00%

=== 2020 census ===
As of the 2020 census, Maywood had a population of 23,512. The median age was 36.0 years. 24.7% of residents were under the age of 18 and 14.4% of residents were 65 years of age or older. For every 100 females there were 91.5 males, and for every 100 females age 18 and over there were 87.8 males age 18 and over.

100.0% of residents lived in urban areas, while 0.0% lived in rural areas.

There were 7,573 households in Maywood, of which 38.8% had children under the age of 18 living in them. Of all households, 33.2% were married-couple households, 19.8% were households with a male householder and no spouse or partner present, and 39.7% were households with a female householder and no spouse or partner present. About 24.0% of all households were made up of individuals and 9.6% had someone living alone who was 65 years of age or older.

The population density was 8,653.66 inhabitants per square mile (3,341.20/km^{2}). There were 8,444 housing units at an average density of 3,107.84 per square mile (1,199.94/km^{2}). Of these units, 10.3% were vacant. The homeowner vacancy rate was 2.8% and the rental vacancy rate was 8.9%.

=== Demographic estimates ===
A Census Bureau profile estimated 5,065 families in the village, with an average household size of 3.86 and an average family size of 3.04.

=== Income and poverty ===
The median income for a household in the village was $56,623, and the median income for a family was $64,212. Males had a median income of $33,250 versus $30,324 for females. The per capita income for the village was $23,725. About 9.6% of families and 11.7% of the population were below the poverty line, including 16.9% of those under age 18 and 11.5% of those age 65 or over.

== Government ==
Mayors of Maywood, Illinois

Image	Mayor	Years	Notes
	Joe Freelon	1981–1989	First African-American mayor of Maywood. After election of April 1981, Freelon and Ron Saunders both claimed victory. After a year of recounts and court challenges, in May 1982, a judge ordered a new election for November 1982. Freelon was appointed acting mayor in the interim and won the election in November.
	Donald Williams (mayor)	1989–1993	Father of Karen Yarbrough; father-in-law to Henderson Yarbrough who later served as mayor of Maywood
	Joe Freelon (2nd term)	1993–2001	
	Ralph W. Connor	2001–2005	
	Henderson Yarbrough	2005–2013	married to Karen Yarbrough, Cook County Clerk and member of Illinois House of Representatives
	Edwenna Perkins	2013–2021	
	Nathaniel George Booker	2021–Present	

== Education ==
Maywood-Melrose Park-Broadview School District 89 operates elementary and middle schools. Proviso Township High Schools District 209 operates high schools, with Proviso East High School being located in Maywood.

Emerson Elementary School is an elementary school in Maywood. Enrollment as of 2006 was 476 students. The school teaches grades kindergarten through fifth grade. Other elementary schools in Maywood include Garfield, Lincoln, Washington Dual Language Academy and Irving Middle School. Maywood residents may apply to Proviso Math & Science Academy in Forest Park.

Triton College is the area community college.

== Infrastructure ==
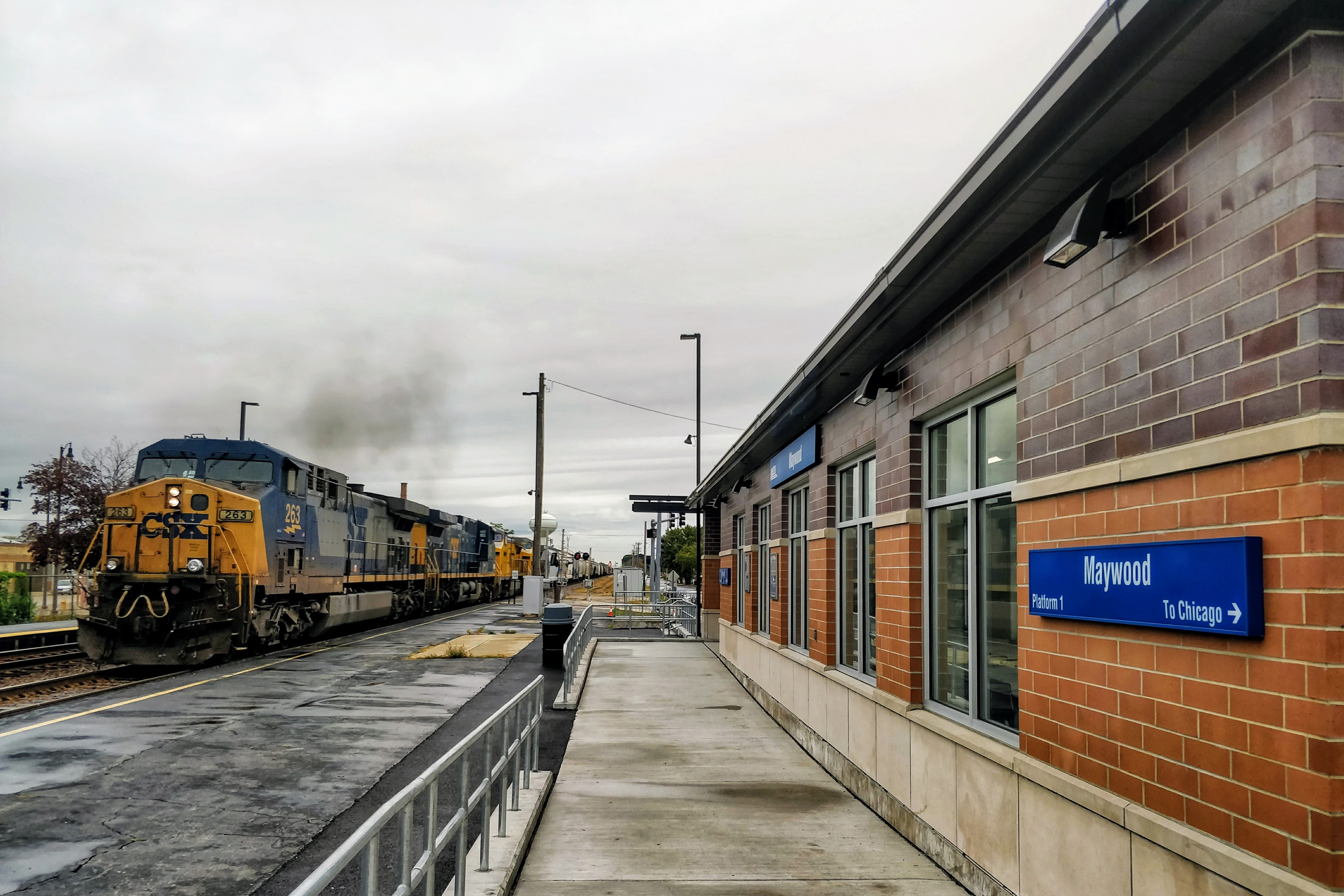
Maywood Commuter Station with CSX freight train passing

=== Transportation ===
==== Public transportation ====
The Village of Maywood is served by the Metra commuter railroad Union Pacific West Line. Trains go east to Ogilvie Transportation Center in Chicago and as far west as Elburn, Illinois. Travel time from Maywood station to Ogilvie is 22 to 27 minutes. There are 13 inbound trains on weekdays, five on Saturdays and four on Sundays. Maywood station is in the heart of Maywood's business district. Maywood is also served by Melrose Park station, located on the border of Maywood and Melrose Park on the west side of town, and portions of the village are closer to the nearby River Forest station.

Pace Bus serves Maywood with lines and stops throughout the Village.

==== Illinois Prairie Path ====
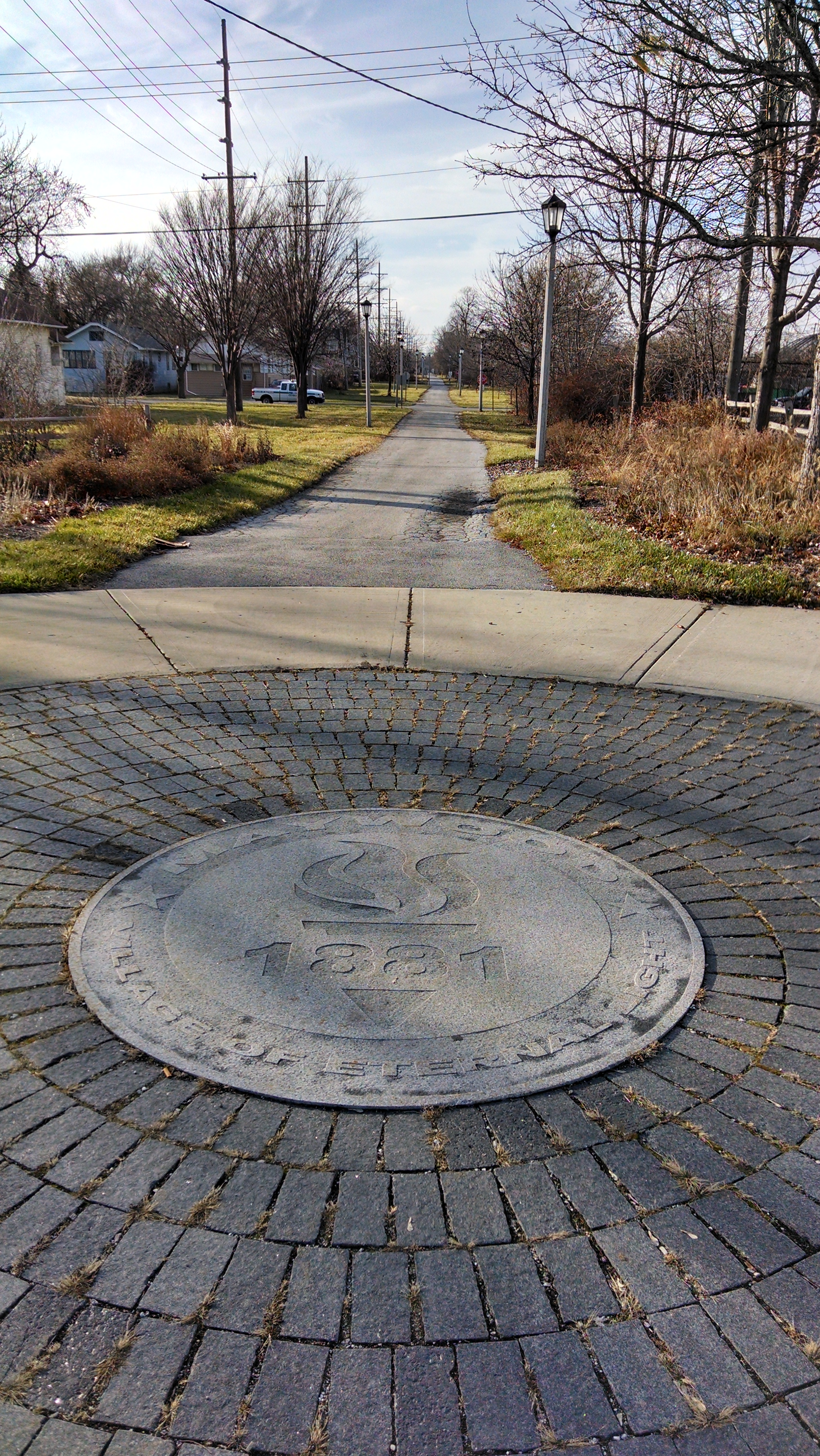
1st Avenue entry to Illinois Prairie Path with Maywood logo

The Illinois Prairie Path is a multi-use nature trail for non-motorized public use: it stretches for approximately 61 miles in Cook, DuPage and Kane counties in northeastern Illinois. It was the first U.S. rail-to-trail conversion in the nation in the 1960s, adapting a former right-of-way for the old Chicago Aurora & Elgin electric railroad.

In Maywood, the path runs between North and South Maywood Drive on the west side of town and along the Adams Street right-of way.

==== Motor vehicle and air travel ====
Interstate 290, the Eisenhower Expressway, bisects (north and south) the town as it goes from Chicago west to join Interstate 294, the Tri-State Tollway, in Hillside. Maywood is located between O'Hare and Midway airports.

== Notable people ==
- Naima Adedapo, singer
- Harry Julian Allen, director of NASA Ames Research Center
- Barbara Berger, catcher in All-American Girls Professional Baseball League; sister of Norma Berger
- Norma Berger, pitcher in the All-American Girls Professional Baseball League; sister of Barbara Berger
- Donnie Boyce, Atlanta Hawks basketball NBA player
- Jim Brewer, NBA basketball player
- Dee Brown, NBA basketball player
- Shannon Brown, NBA basketball player
- Sterling Brown, NBA basketball player
- Ray Buchanan, professional football player
- Walter Burley Griffin, architect, designer of Canberra, capital city of Australia.
- Jevon Carter, NBA basketball player
- Eugene Cernan, astronaut, walked on the Moon during the Apollo 17 mission
- Michael Curry, presiding bishop of Episcopal Church
- Bill Donovan, pitcher for the Boston Braves
- Todd Dulaney, gospel musician
- Michael Finley, NBA basketball player
- Dennis Franz, actor
- Craig Hall, ballet dancer
- Fred Hampton, Black Panther
- Shirley Jameson, nationally recognized speed skater and softball player, and outfielder in All-American Girls Professional Baseball League
- Sheila Crump Johnson, co-founder of BET
- Jacques Paul Klein, ambassador; Under-Secretary-General of the United Nations (Ret.); Major General, USAF (Ret.)
- Jackie LaVine, Olympic bronze medalist in swimming
- Paris Lee (born 1995), basketball player in the Israeli Basketball Premier League
- Charles Lindbergh, aviator
- Eugene Moore, politician; served as Cook County recorder of deeds and as a member of the Illinois House of Representatives
- Ray Nitschke, professional football player, Hall of Famer
- Walter "Walt" Parazaider, retired woodwind musician and founding member of Chicago
- John Prine, singer, musician, and award-winning songwriter
- Doc Rivers, NBA basketball player, head coach of NBA's Milwaukee Bucks
- Wanda Sharp, Illinois state representative
- Perrion Winfrey, NFL football player
- W.A. Yackey, decorated WWI pilot, 1920s aviator and final owner of Checkerboard Field
