= Bellwood School District =

Bellwood School District may refer to:

- Bellwood-Antis School District in Pennsylvania
- Bellwood School District 88 in Illinois
