= River Forest station =

Commuter rail station in River Forest, Illinois

River Forest

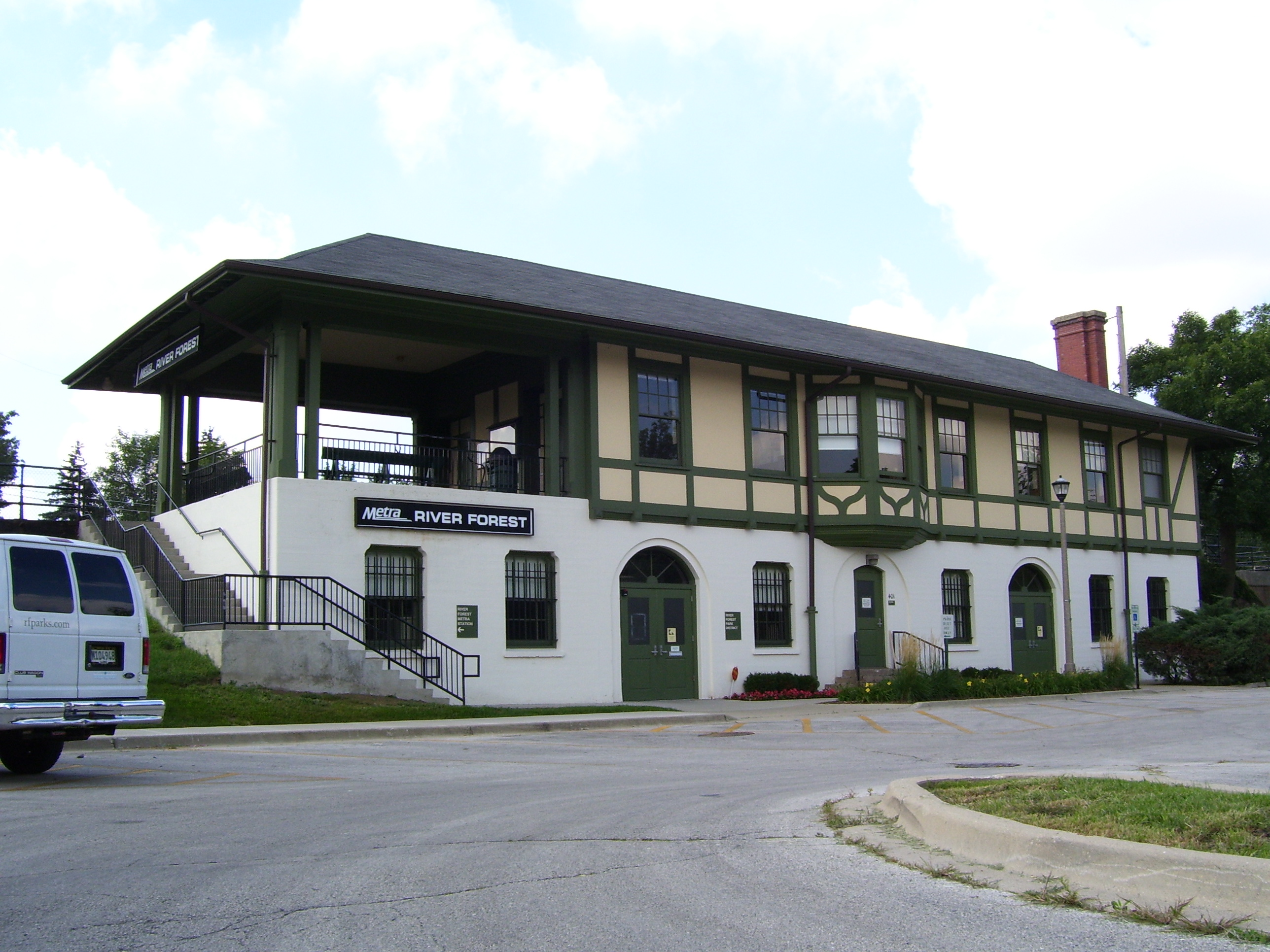
- River Forest station in September 2006

General information
- Location: 8001 West Central Street; River Forest, Illinois 60305
- Coordinates: 41.8870°N 87.8249°W
- Owner: Union Pacific
- Platforms: 1 side platform (formerly 2); 1 island platform
- Tracks: 3 (formerly 4)
- Connections: Pace

Construction
- Accessible: No

Other information
- Fare zone: 2

History
- Opened: 1915; 111 years ago

Passengers
- 2018: 448 (average weekday) ▲2.3%
- Rank: 107 out of 236

Services
Preceding station	Metra	Following station
Maywood toward Elburn	Union Pacific West	Oak Park toward Ogilvie TC
Former services
Preceding station	Chicago and North Western Railway	Following station
Bellwood toward Omaha	Main Line	Oak Park toward Chicago
Maywood toward Geneva	Galena Division	Lathrop Avenue toward Chicago
Track layout
Location

River Forest is a Metra commuter railroad station in River Forest, Illinois, United States, a western suburb of Chicago, on the Union Pacific West Line. Trains go east to Ogilvie Transportation Center in Chicago and as far west as Elburn, Illinois. Travel time to Ogilvie is 20 to 24 minutes. As of 2018, River Forest is the 107th busiest of the 236 non-downtown stations in the Metra system, with an average of 448 weekday boardings. Unless otherwise announced, inbound trains use the north (side) platform and outbound trains use the south (island) platform.

As of September 8, 2025, River Forest is served by 43 trains (21 inbound, 22 outbound) on weekdays, by all 20 trains (10 in each direction) on Saturdays, and by all 18 trains (nine in each direction) on Sundays and holidays.

The station is at Central Avenue and Thatcher Avenue. The surrounding neighborhood is mostly characterized by single-family homes, baseball fields and tennis courts. Pace suburban buses stop one block to the north on Lake Street. To the east is an overpass that carries the Canadian National Railway's Waukesha Subdivision into Forest Park where the line rechristens itself to the CSX Altenheim Subdivision (B&OCT).

The station building was originally built in 1915 by the Chicago and North Western Railway and is also the River Forest Park District headquarters.

The station has recently undergone renovations. The inbound platform was rebuilt along with the stairways.

== Bus connections ==
Pace

- 309 Lake Street
- 313 St. Charles Road
