= Melrose Park, Illinois =

- Village
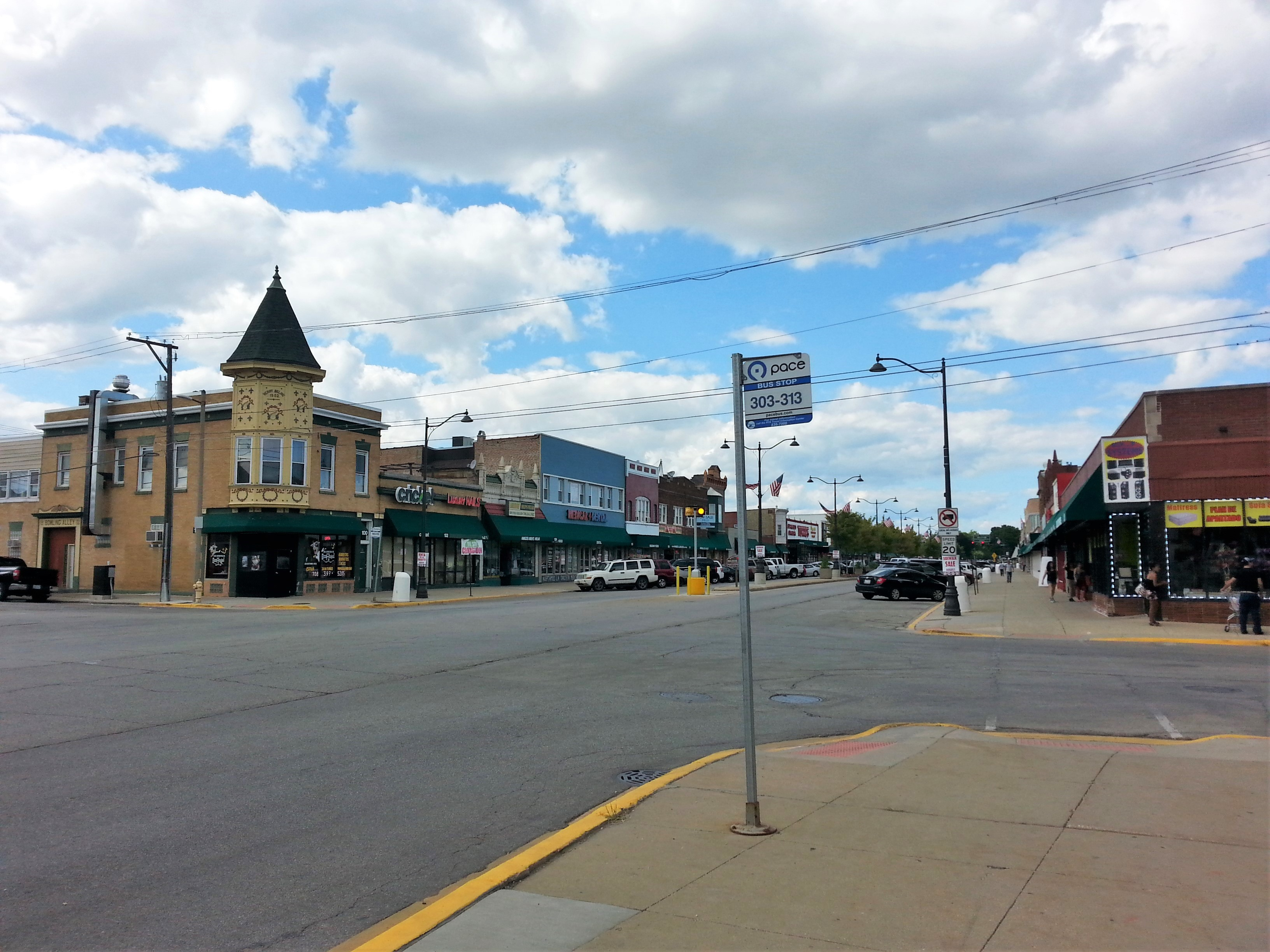
- Downtown Melrose Park
- Motto: "Corporate King of the Suburbs"
- Location of Melrose Park in Cook County, Illinois.

- Location within Greater Chicago Location within Illinois Location within the United States
- Coordinates: 41°54′28″N 87°51′52″W
- Country: United States
- State: Illinois
- County: Cook
- Township: Proviso, Leyden
- Incorporated: September 11, 1882

Government
  - Mayor: Ronald M. Serpico

Area
  - Total: 4.35 sq mi (11.27 km^{2})
  - Land: 4.35 sq mi (11.27 km^{2})
  - Water: 0 sq mi (0.00 km^{2})
- Elevation: 630 ft (190 m)

Population (2020)
  - Total: 24,796
  - Density: 5,696.0/sq mi (2,199.22/km^{2})
- Demonym: Melrose Parker
- Time zone: UTC-6 (CST)
  - Summer (DST): UTC-5 (CDT)
- ZIP Code(s): 60160, 60161, 60164
- Area codes: 708/464, 847/224
- FIPS code: 17-48242
- Website: melrosepark.org

Melrose Park is a village in Leyden and Proviso Townships, Cook County, Illinois, United States. It is a suburb of Chicago. As of the 2020 census it had a population of 24,796.

The suburb was the home of Kiddieland Amusement Park from 1929 until 2010 (it closed in September 2009 before it was demolished in 2010 and the sign of Kiddieland was relocated to the Melrose Park Public Library; a Costco warehouse store now stands in its place), the Shrine of Our Lady of Mt. Carmel, Stern Pinball, Inc., the Melrose Park Taste, and the now-defunct Maywood Park horse racing track.

There is a Metra railroad station in Melrose Park with daily service to Chicago. Melrose Park is home to Gottlieb Memorial Hospital.

== History ==
According to the Encyclopedia of Chicago, in 1882 residents of a then-unincorporated portion of Proviso Township voted to establish their own municipality—called simply "Melrose" until 11 years later, in 1893, when the "Park" was added and population in the area began to steadily increase. The first Italian-Americans arrived in 1888.

On March 28, 1920, the F4 Palm Sunday tornado cut a 328-foot-wide (100 m) path over 1,094 yards (1,000 m) through the village and killed ten people. It destroyed the Sacred Heart Church and attached convent.

At the turn of the 20th century, the population surge plateaued and industry began to stagnate; it was only after World War I that the local economy was able to recover, the result of some manufacturing companies setting up shop in the village. New industry, coupled with Melrose Park's prime geographic location next to the Proviso freight yards, led to a steady increase in the number of area jobs. This continued after World War II, with still more companies moving to Melrose Park. Zenith Electronics, Alberto-Culver, Jewel, and International Harvester (now Navistar) are some examples. Many of these companies are still located in Melrose Park and the local industry remains stable, but Alberto-Culver no longer exists, Zenith continues to exist as a brand only today, and Navistar's plant facility closed in 2021 and was eventually demolished.

During the late 1990s, to attract more commerce, the village underwent major cosmetic improvements, beginning with the redesigning of all village street signs. The wooded area on both sides of Silver Creek, between Broadway and 17th Avenue along North Avenue, was almost completely excavated, the grass replaced, and wood chips were added along the bases of the remaining trees. Many busy streets were repaved and the athletic field next to the village hall was completely redone. This has helped not only to attract new businesses but also many first-time home buyers.

The athletic field next to the village hall is named after the late Ralph "Babe" Serpico, father of the current mayor, Ronald M. Serpico.

In 2020, the village's fire department took over the fire protection services of nearby Stone Park, Illinois. Heavy financial burdens, staffing conflicts, and safety issues prompted this move, rendering Stone Park as one of the municipal entities in the United States without a fire department of its own. Another referendum to reinstate the Stone Park Fire Department in April 2021 fell short with only 34% of the village's residents casting the vote.

== Geography ==
According to the 2021 census gazetteer files, Melrose Park has a total area of 4.35 square miles (11.27 km^{2}), all land.

== Demographics ==
Historical population
Census	Pop.	Note	%±
1880	200		—
1890	650		225.0%
1900	2,592		298.8%
1910	4,806		85.4%
1920	7,147		48.7%
1930	10,741		50.3%
1940	10,933		1.8%
1950	13,366		22.3%
1960	22,291		66.8%
1970	22,716		1.9%
1980	20,735		−8.7%
1990	20,859		0.6%
2000	23,171		11.1%
2010	25,411		9.7%
2020	24,796		−2.4%
U.S. Decennial Census

=== Racial and ethnic composition ===
Melrose Park village, Illinois – Racial and ethnic composition Note: the US Census treats Hispanic/Latino as an ethnic category. This table excludes Latinos from the racial categories and assigns them to a separate category. Hispanics/Latinos may be of any race.
Race / Ethnicity (NH = Non-Hispanic)	Pop 2000	Pop 2010	Pop 2020	% 2000	% 2010	% 2020
White alone (NH)	9,380	5,768	4,292	40.48%	22.70%	17.31%
Black or African American alone (NH)	634	1,334	1,442	2.74%	5.25%	5.82%
Native American or Alaska Native alone (NH)	18	22	11	0.08%	0.09%	0.04%
Asian alone (NH)	455	430	308	1.96%	1.69%	1.24%
Pacific Islander alone (NH)	0	5	3	0.00%	0.02%	0.01%
Other race alone (NH)	10	39	55	0.04%	0.15%	0.22%
Mixed race or Multiracial (NH)	189	138	166	0.82%	0.54%	0.67%
Hispanic or Latino (any race)	12,485	17,675	18,519	53.88%	69.56%	74.69%
Total	23,171	25,411	24,796	100.00%	100.00%	100.00%

=== 2020 census ===
As of the 2020 census, Melrose Park had a population of 24,796. The median age was 35.1 years. 25.4% of residents were under the age of 18 and 12.1% of residents were 65 years of age or older. For every 100 females, there were 97.3 males, and for every 100 females age 18 and over, there were 96.1 males.

100.0% of residents lived in urban areas, while 0.0% lived in rural areas.

There were 8,294 households in Melrose Park, of which 40.3% had children under the age of 18 living in them. Of all households, 42.6% were married-couple households, 21.4% were households with a male householder and no spouse or partner present, and 28.9% were households with a female householder and no spouse or partner present. About 24.7% of all households were made up of individuals and 10.9% had someone living alone who was 65 years of age or older.

There were 8,756 housing units, of which 5.3% were vacant. The homeowner vacancy rate was 1.0% and the rental vacancy rate was 5.5%.

=== Demographic estimates ===
The population density was 5,696.30 inhabitants per square mile (2,199.35/km^{2}), and the housing unit density was 2,011.49 per square mile (776.64/km^{2}). The average household size was 3.91 and the average family size was 3.22.

The age distribution included 9.5% from 18 to 24, 31% from 25 to 44, and 22.7% from 45 to 64.

=== Income and poverty ===
The median income for a household in the village was $53,596, and the median income for a family was $58,589. Males had a median income of $35,774 versus $27,872 for females. The per capita income for the village was $21,881. About 12.6% of families and 15.8% of the population were below the poverty line, including 21.4% of those under age 18 and 13.5% of those age 65 or over.

== Economy ==
Navistar International had a factory and an engine group office in Melrose Park which closed in 2021. This building was formerly a Buick plant that made aircraft engines for WWII. Melrose Park Immediate Care is a medical and dental clinic located in downtown Melrose Park. Melrose Park is also home to WellNow Urgent Care and West Lake Urgent Care.

In March 2021 Lake Book Manufacturing, a company of nearly 300 employees specializing in book printing, was acquired by Grafica Veneta.

== Education ==
Elementary school districts serving sections of Melrose Park:

- Maywood-Melrose Park-Broadview School District 89
  - Jane Addams Elementary School
  - Melrose Park Elementary School
  - Stevenson Middle School
- Mannheim School District 83
  - Mannheim Middle School
  - Scott Elementary School
  - Enger School (for disabled children; Franklin Park)
- Bellwood School District 88
  - Grant Elementary School
  - Thurgood Marshall Elementary School (Bellwood)
  - Roosevelt Middle School (Bellwood)

High schools and colleges in Melrose Park:

- Private schools:
  - Walther Christian Academy
- Colleges
  - Lincoln College of Technology

Proviso Township High Schools District 209 serves Melrose Park students with Proviso East High School in Maywood.

Other private schools in the area are Fenwick High School in Oak Park and St. Patrick High School in Chicago.

The area's community college is Triton College in River Grove.

== Transportation ==
The Melrose Park station provides Metra commuter rail service along the Union Pacific West Line. Trains travel east to Ogilvie Transportation Center in Chicago, and west to Elburn station. Bus service in the village is provided by Pace.

== Notable people ==
- Joseph Aiuppa, Chicago mob boss notable for Las Vegas casino skimming.
- Dominic Armato, actor, journalist, and food critic
- Nicholas John Bua (1925–2002), district judge of the U.S. District Court for the Northern District of Illinois from 1977 until 1991. He was a resident of Melrose Park.
- Clara Cannucciari (1915–2013), host of the web series Great Depression Cooking with Clara and author of the book Clara's Kitchen
- Javier Casas, soccer player
- Anna Chlumsky, actress, graduated from Walther Christian Academy in Melrose Park
- Tim Costo, outfielder and first baseman for the Cincinnati Reds
- Michael Finley, former NBA all-star with the Dallas Mavericks, played for several NBA teams
- Roy Gleason, outfielder with the Los Angeles Dodgers
- Dennis Grimaldi, actor, dancer, director, choreographer, and TV producer, Tony Award and Pulitzer Prize-winning theatre producer
- Ken Grundt, professional pitcher for several league baseball organizations
- Vinnie Hinostroza, professional ice hockey player for the Buffalo Sabres
- Carol Lawrence, actress, singer and dancer
- Berger Loman (1886–1968), soldier in the United States Army and recipient of the Medal of Honor for actions during World War I. In the 1950s, he resided at 1050 Montana Street.
- Corey Maggette, small forward and shooting guard for several NBA teams
- Caroline Myss, spiritual author
- Charles Nicoletti, mobster.
- Doc Rivers, guard for the Atlanta Hawks and now coach of the Los Angeles Clippers
- Vasili Spanos, Minor League third baseman, played for the US Olympic baseball team (2004)
- Mike Woodard, second baseman for the San Francisco Giants and Chicago White Sox
- Anthony Zizzo, mobster

== Sports ==
In 2012, Melrose Park became home to the Chicago Vipers who play in the Continental Indoor Football League. They played their home games at Sports Zone before being renamed the Chicago Pythons and moving to Homer Glen. They wrapped up following their inaugural season.
