= Trebaseleghe =

Trebaseleghe Trebaxéłeghe (Venetian)
- Comune
- Comune di Trebaseleghe
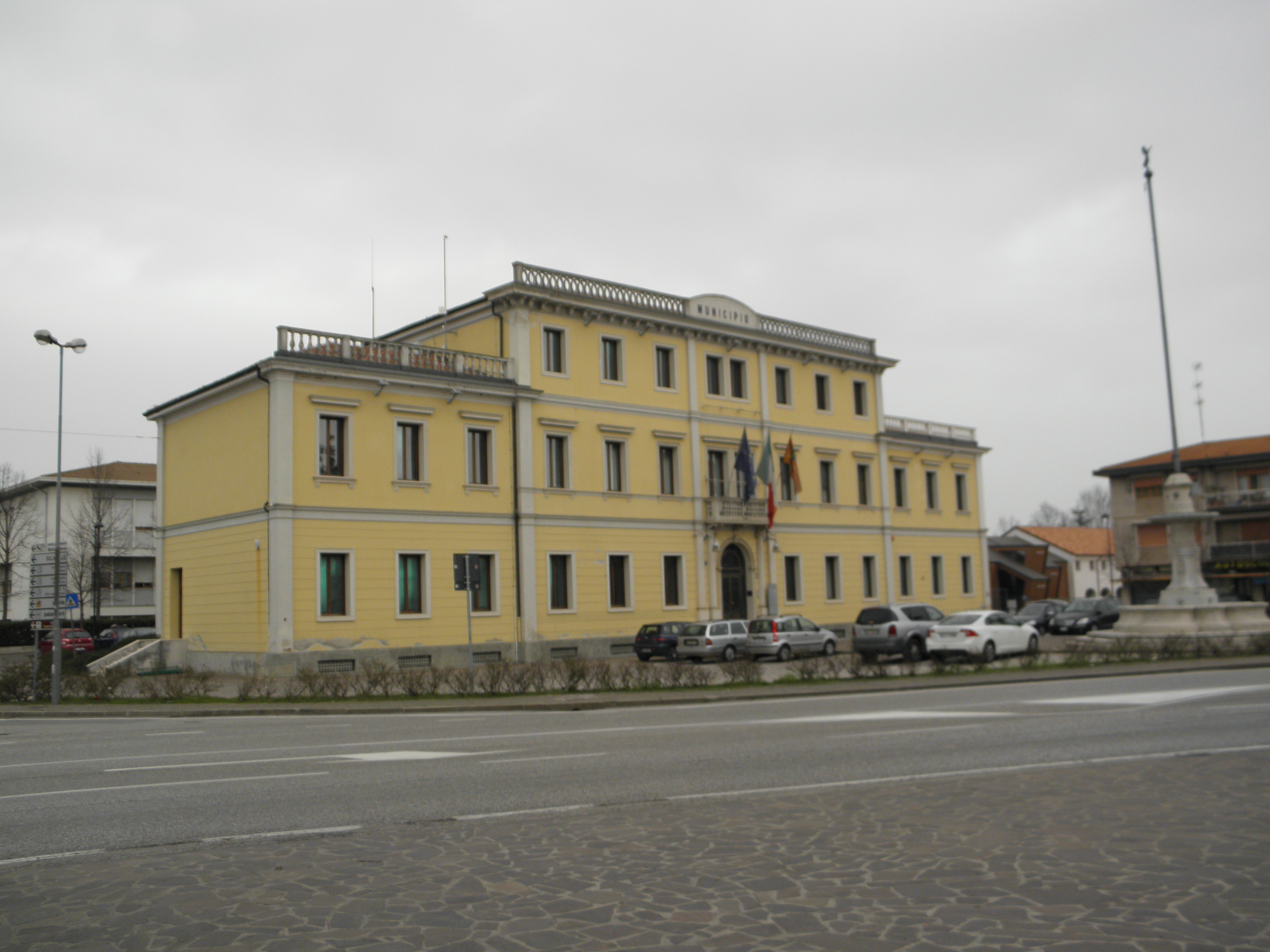
- Town hall.

- Location within Italy Location within Veneto
- Coordinates: 45°35′N 12°3′E
- Country: Italy
- Region: Veneto
- Province: Padua (PD)
- Frazioni: Sant'Ambrogio, Silvelle, Fossalta

Government
  - Mayor: Antonella Zoggia

Area
  - Total: 30.7 km^{2} (11.9 sq mi)
- Elevation: 22 m (72 ft)

Population (31 December 2015)
  - Total: 12,840
  - Density: 418/km^{2} (1,080/sq mi)
- Demonym: Trebaselicensi
- Time zone: UTC+1 (CET)
  - Summer (DST): UTC+2 (CEST)
- Postal code: 35010
- Dialing code: 049
- Patron saint: Nativity of Blessed Virgin Mary
- Saint day: September 8
- Website: www.comune.trebaseleghe.pd.it

Trebaseleghe (Italian: [trebaˈzeːleɡe]; Venetian: Trebaxéłeghe [tɾebaˈzeɰeɡe]; lit. 'three basilicas') is a comune (municipality) in the Province of Padua in the Italian region of Veneto, located about 25 kilometres (16 mi) northwest of Venice and about 25 kilometres (16 mi) northeast of Padua.

The town houses the headquarters of Grafica Veneta, the Italian publisher of the Harry Potter books, which partially converted its production to protective masks for the general population during the 2019-20 COVID-19 pandemic in Italy.
