= Maywood-Melrose Park-Broadview School District 89 =

School district in Illinois, United States

Address
- 906 Walton Street Melrose Park, Illinois, 60160; United States

District information
- Type: Public
- Grades: PreK–8
- Superintendent: Dr. Algeanna Griffin
- Schools: 9
- NCES District ID: 1725110

Students and staff
- Students: 4,000

Other information
- Website: www.maywood89.org

Maywood-Melrose Park-Broadview School District 89 is a public elementary school district headquartered in Melrose Park, Illinois, serving the communities of Melrose Park, Maywood, and Broadview. The district provides education for students in kindergarten through eighth grade and operates multiple elementary schools, two middle schools—Irving Middle School and Stevenson Middle School—and Washington Dual Language Academy, a K–8 dual language school. District 89 serves approximately 4,000 students across nine campuses.

== History ==
School District 89 traces its origins to Washington Elementary School, established in 1931 as the first school in the Maywood-Melrose Park-Broadview area. Over the years, the district has expanded to serve a diverse student population across multiple schools within the Maywood, Melrose Park, and Broadview communities. District 89 is led by Superintendent Dr. Algeanna Griffin.

== Schools ==
- Emerson Elementary School (Maywood)
- Garfield Elementary School (Maywood)
- Irving Middle School (Maywood)
- Jane Addams Elementary School (Melrose Park)
- Lincoln Elementary School (Maywood)
- Melrose Park Elementary School (Melrose Park)
- Roosevelt Elementary School (Broadview)
- Stevenson Middle School (Melrose Park)
- Washington Dual Language Academy (Maywood)
