= Walther Christian Academy =

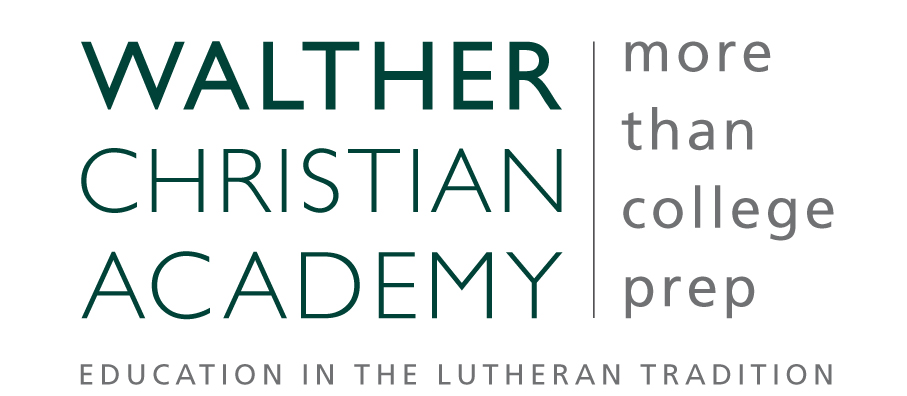

Location
- 900 Chicago Avenue; Melrose Park, Illinois 60160; United States; 41°53′35.1″N 87°50′44.2″W

Information
- Former name: Walther Lutheran High School
- Type: Private secondary school
- Motto: Education in the Lutheran Tradition
- Religious affiliations: Lutheranism, Christianity
- Denomination: Lutheran Church–Missouri Synod
- Established: September 12, 1954; 72 years ago
- Principal: Terrence Swims
- Grades: 6—12
- Gender: Coeducational
- Enrollment: 289
- Student to teacher ratio: 13:1
- Colors: Green & white
- Slogan: We Are Walther
- Fight song: Walther Fight Song
- Athletics conference: Northeastern Athletic
- Mascot: Bronco
- Team name: Broncos
- Rival: Holy Trinity
- Accreditation: North Central Association of Colleges and Schools
- Yearbook: Remuda
- Website: www.walther.com

Walther Christian Academy (formerly known as Walther Lutheran High School) is a private Lutheran high school and middle school in Melrose Park, Illinois, United States. Established in 1954, the school is affiliated with the Lutheran Church–Missouri Synod.

== History ==
Walther was founded and built in its present location with the support of Lutheran congregations in the western suburbs. St. Paul Lutheran Church in Melrose Park had purchased the land from Superior Street to Iowa Street at a relatively low cost. Since St. Paul was planning to build a new church and school, they wanted to sell this land to get funds for their building project. There were several laymen from the surrounding congregations who played a key role in development of Walther. Most prominent was Bill Bussert of St. Paul, who built a log cabin on the property that could be used for church purposes and to show the community that they were serious about building a high school there.

The Lutheran High School Association wanted to name the new school Luther West to match the Chicago schools (Luther South and Luther North) but that idea met strong opposition from several of the academy's founders. They brainstormed with other leaders and came up with Walther Lutheran High School, in honor of C. F. W. Walther, the first president of the Lutheran Church–Missouri Synod; the youth and young adult groups of the synod at that time were called Walther Leagues. The nickname “Broncos” came because Walther was the school "out west".

There were 34 sophomores and 72 freshmen the first year at Walther. The initial classes on September 12, 1954, were held at Grace Lutheran School, on the campus of Concordia Teachers College, in River Forest because the building in Melrose Park had not been completed.

== Notable alumni ==
- Doug Dumler, American football player who played as an offensive lineman for the New England Patriots
