= Oak Park station (Metra) =

Commuter rail station in Oak Park, Illinois

Oak Park

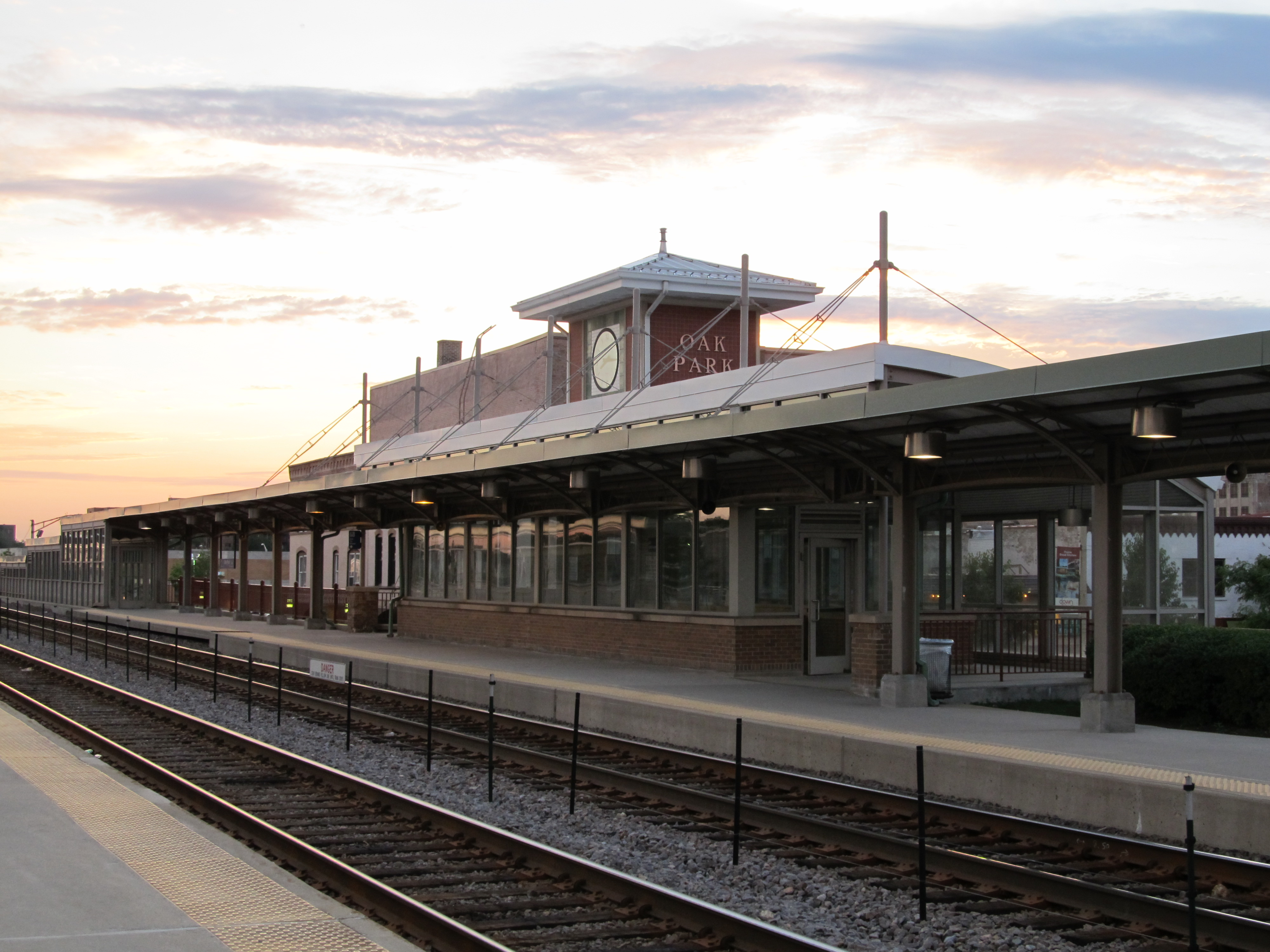

General information
- Location: 1115 North Boulevard; Oak Park, Illinois 60301
- Coordinates: 41.8871°N 87.8011°W
- Owner: Village of Oak Park
- Platforms: 1 island platform, 1 side platform
- Tracks: 3
- Connections: Green at Harlem/Lake; CTA Bus; Pace Bus

Construction
- Accessible: Yes

Other information
- Fare zone: 2

History
- Opened: 1849; 177 years ago
- Rebuilt: 1999; 27 years ago

Passengers
- 2018: 991 (average weekday) ▲9.5%
- Rank: 52 out of 236

Services
Preceding station	Metra	Following station
River Forest toward Elburn	Union Pacific West	Kedzie toward Ogilvie TC
Former services
Preceding station	Chicago and North Western Railway	Following station
Maywood toward Omaha	Main Line	Kedzie toward Chicago
Lathrop Avenue toward Geneva	Galena Division	Avenue toward Chicago
Track layout
Key
Location

Oak Park is a Metra commuter railroad station in Oak Park, Illinois, just west of Chicago. It is served by Metra's Union Pacific West Line, with service east to Ogilvie Transportation Center in Chicago and as far west as Elburn, Illinois. Travel time to Chicago is 16 to 20 minutes. As of 2018, Oak Park is the 52nd busiest of the 236 non-downtown stations in the Metra system, with an average of 991 weekday boardings. It is the final stop for most UP West trains before the terminus at Ogilvie Transportation Center. Unless otherwise announced, inbound trains use the north (side) platform and outbound trains use the south (island) platform.

As of September 8, 2025, Oak Park is served by 56 trains (28 in each direction) on weekdays, all 20 trains (10 in each direction) on Saturdays, and all 18 trains (nine in each direction) on Sundays and holidays.

The station is located along North Boulevard between Marion Street and Harlem Avenue, Oak Park's western border with River Forest and Forest Park. The Chicago Transit Authority's Green Line ends at Harlem/Lake and is connected directly to this station at Marion Street. Downtown Oak Park, which includes a large shopping district spread over both Oak Park and River Forest, is nearby with many stores centered on Harlem Avenue and Lake Street.

== Amenities ==
A small convenience store is located on the main concourse.

The north platform, which services inbound trains, is sheltered and has assorted benches. The island platform to the south, which services outbound trains, also has benches, although the access ramp from the concourse is sheltered and enclosed.

== Bus and rail connections ==
CTA Green Line

- Harlem/Lake

CTA

- 90 Harlem

Pace

- 307 Harlem Avenue
- 309 Lake Street
- 313 St. Charles Road
- 318 West North Avenue
