= Berkeley station (Illinois) =

Commuter rail station in Berkeley, Illinois

Berkeley

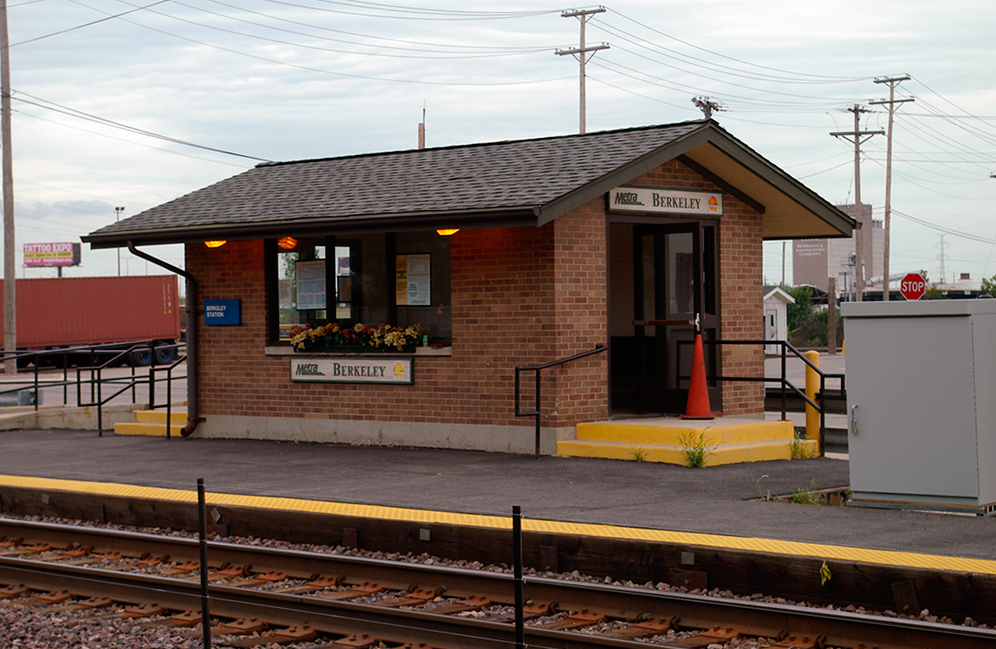
- Berkeley station in 2010

General information
- Location: 5900 West Park Avenue; Berkeley, Illinois
- Coordinates: 41.8961°N 87.9152°W
- Owner: Union Pacific
- Platforms: 1 Side platform 1 Island platform
- Tracks: 3

Construction
- Parking: Yes
- Cycle facilities: Yes
- Accessible: Yes

Other information
- Fare zone: 2

History
- Rebuilt: 2013; 13 years ago
- Former names: Proviso

Passengers
- 2018: 145 (average weekday) ▲3.6%
- Rank: 173 out of 236

Services
Preceding station	Metra	Following station
Elmhurst toward Elburn	Union Pacific West	Bellwood toward Ogilvie TC
Former services
Preceding station	Chicago and North Western Railway	Following station
Elmhurst toward Geneva	Galena Division	Bellwood toward Chicago
Track layout
Location

Berkeley is a Metra commuter railroad station in Berkeley, Illinois, a western suburb of Chicago. It is served by the Union Pacific West Line, and lies 14.3 miles (23.0 km) from the eastern terminus. Trains go east to Ogilvie Transportation Center in Chicago and as far west as Elburn, Illinois. Travel time to Ogilvie is 29 to 36 minutes, depending on the service. As of 2018, Berkeley is the 173rd busiest of the 236 non-downtown stations in the Metra system, with an average of 145 weekday boardings. Unless otherwise announced, inbound trains use the north (island) platform and outbound trains use the south (side) platform.

As of September 8, 2025, Berkeley is served by 43 trains (21 inbound, 22 outbound) on weekdays, by all 20 trains (10 in each direction) on Saturdays, and by all 18 trains (nine in each direction) on Sundays and holidays.

The station is at Park Avenue and Arthur Avenue. To the south there is a parking lot, a residential neighborhood of single-family homes, several distribution centers and warehouses. A large industrial estate that houses the Proviso Yard of Union Pacific Railroad sits to the north. Immediately to the west there are two highway overpasses that carry Interstate 294 and Interstate 290, respectively, over the freight yard. Berkeley Village Hall is on Electric Avenue, about a mile to the south.

The station was formerly a two-track facility. As part of the CREATE Program project B2, the station gained a third track and pedestrian underpass tunnel in 2013.
