= Joy Alappatt =

Indian Syro-Malabar Catholic bishop (b. 1956)

Mar John Alappatt ܝܘܚܢܢ ܐܠܦܬ
- Eparch of St. Thomas of Chicago
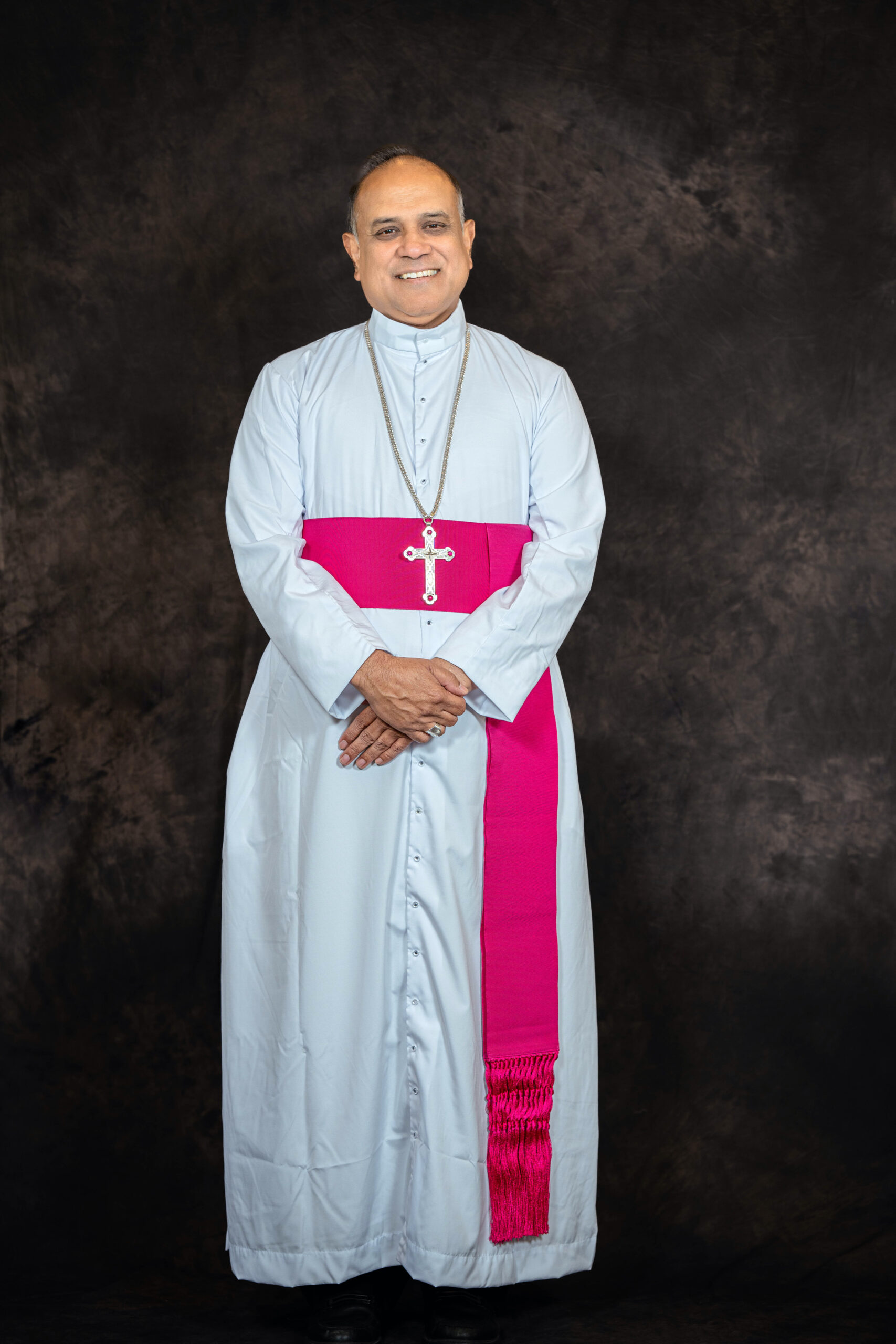
- Church: Syro-Malabar Catholic Church
- Diocese: Syro-Malabar Catholic Eparchy of St. Thomas of Chicago
- Appointed: July 3, 2022
- Installed: October 1, 2022
- Predecessor: Jacob Angadiath
- Previous posts: Auxiliary Eparch of St. Thomas of Chicago (2014-2022); Titular Bishop of Bencenna (2014-2022)

Orders
- Ordination: December 31, 1981 by James Pazhayattil
- Consecration: September 27, 2014 by George Alencherry, Jacob Angadiath and Pauly Kannookadan

Personal details
- Born: John Alappatt; September 27, 1956 (age 70) Parappukara, Kerala, India
- Motto: Joyfully for your souls

Styles of Joy Alappatt
- Reference style: Mar
- Spoken style: Mar
- Religious style: Eparch

Mar John "Joy" Alappatt (born September 27, 1956) is an Indian-born bishop of the Syro-Malabar Catholic Church in the United States. He serves as the eparch of St. Thomas Eparchy of Chicago since 2022.

He served as the auxiliary bishop of the same eparchy from 2014–2022.

== Biography ==
=== Early life and ministry ===
John Joy Alappatt was born in Parappukara, Kerala, India. He studied for the priesthood at St. Thomas Apostolic Seminary in Vadavathoor, and was ordained a priest for the Syro-Malabar Catholic Eparchy of Irinjalakuda in India on December 31, 1981, by Bishop James Pazhayattil. Alappatt continued his studies at St. Joseph's Pontifical Institute in Aluva an at the Adheva University in Wattair. He was then engaged in pastoral work in Chalkudy, Mala, the cathedral in Irinjalakuda, and as a chaplain in Chennai. In 1993 he was transferred to the United States where he served as a chaplain at the Georgetown University Medical Center where he also completed his clinical pastoral education program. Alappatt also served in pastoral assignments in New Milford, Newark and Garfield, New Jersey and as the vicar at the Mar Thoma Shleeha Cathedral in Bellwood, Illinois.

=== Auxiliary Bishop ===
Pope Francis named Alappatt as the titular bishop of Bencenna and the Auxiliary Bishop of the St. Thomas Syro-Malabar Catholic Eparchy of Chicago on July 24, 2014. He was ordained a bishop by George Alencherry, the major archbishop of Ernakulam-Angamaly, on September 27, 2014. The principal co-consecrators were Jacob Angadiath of Chicago and Pauly Kannookadan of Irinjalakuda.

=== Eparch ===
On July 3, 2022, Pope Francis accepted Bishop Jacob Angadiath's resignation, and named Alappatt as successor.

Alappatt was installed at the Mar Thoma Sleeha Syro-Malabar Catholic Cathedral in Bellwood, Illinois by head of the Syro-Malabar Church George Alencherry, Jacob Angadiath, and Stephen Chirappanath in the presence of Christophe Pierre, apostolic nuncio to the United States.

On July 20, 2024, Mar Joy Alappatt celebrated the Holy Qurbana at the 10th National Eucharistic Congress with Ukrainian Catholic Archeparchy of Philadelphia Archbishop Borys Gudziak in front of a crowd of 25,000 people including Papal Delegate Cardinal Luis Antonio Tagle and Apostolic Nuncio Cardinal Christophe Pierre

== See also ==
- Catholic Church hierarchy
- Catholic Church in the United States
- Historical list of the Catholic bishops of the United States
- List of Catholic bishops of the United States
- Lists of patriarchs, archbishops, and bishops

== Episcopal succession ==
Catholic Church titles
Preceded by Jacob Angadiath	Eparch of St. Thomas of Chicago; 2022-Present	Succeeded by Incumbent
