= Grafica Veneta =

Printing company in Italy

Grafica Veneta, headquartered in Trebaseleghe (Padua), is the leading book printing company in Italy.

== History ==
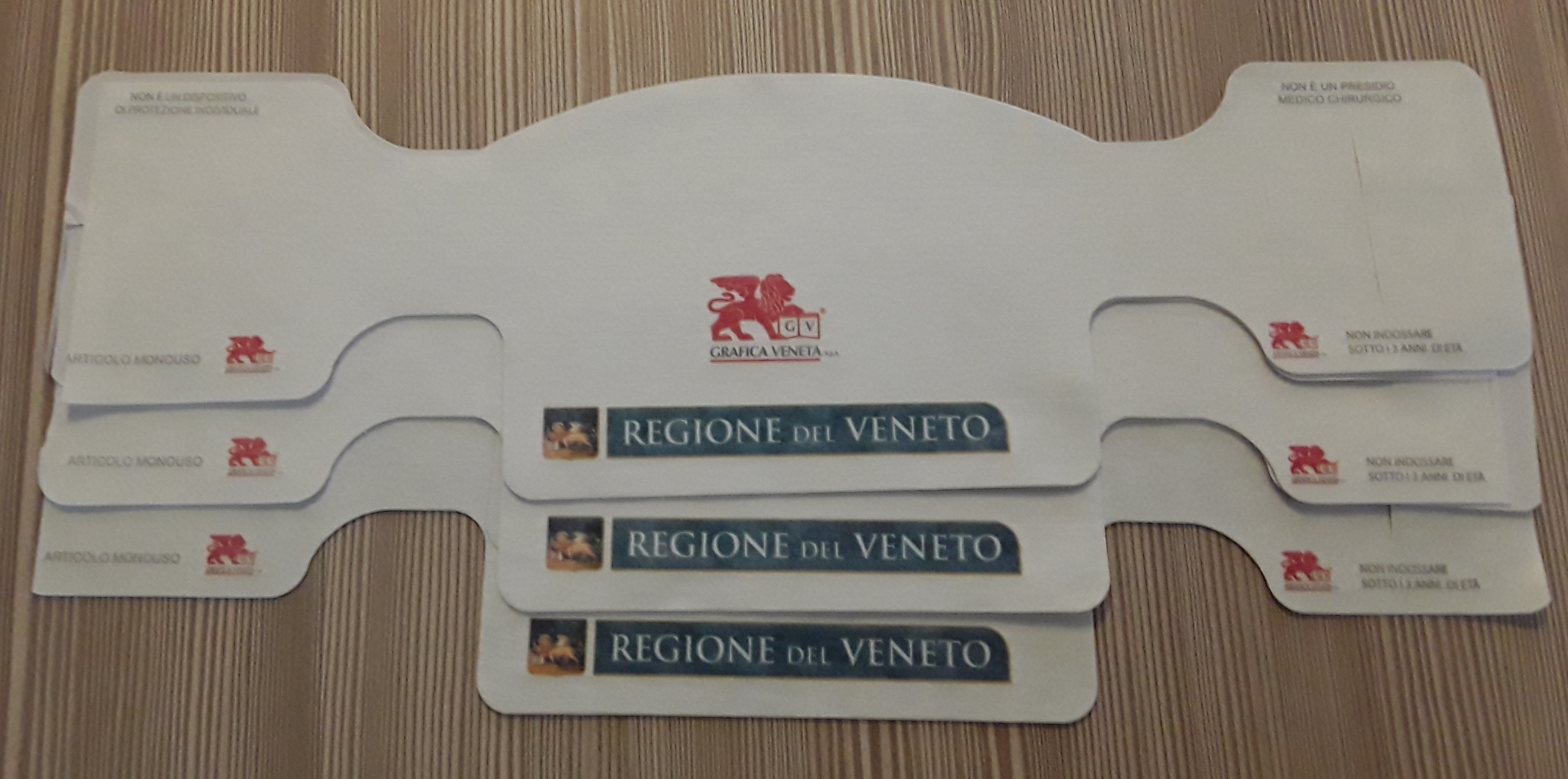
The protective masks donated by Grafica Veneta to the Region of Veneto

Grafica Veneta was originally an atepre-press link founded by two brothers, Rino and Sergio Franceschi, at early 1960s. This is not that in 1982, the company embarked on the impression. Outside the works normal cities, it then prints on behalf of provincial councils brochures and leaflets for various regions of Italy.

In 2000, despite the inherent risks, Grafica Veneta decides, under the leadership of his current president, Fabio Franceschi, to manage in printing books. With a used Goss press, replaced infollowing by several Timsons one and two colors, and a Müller Martini Normbinder, the company is trying his luck on this still unfinished ground. The company is actively prospecting with major Italian publishers, and more broadly in Europe, Africa, and the Middle East and the United States. The New York Times entrusted the company on the 100th anniversary of the baseball team New York Yankees. In 2007, a new production site duction is born on a plot of 26,000 square meters. It prints on this date more than 100 million books per year, has 220 employees, six presses and an extended binding pole.

In March 2021, it took control of Lake Book Manufacturing, a book manufacturing company of Melrose Park, Illinois, active in the North American market. As of this date, it has 700 employees, including 500 in Italy and 200 in the United States that aims to print 500 million books in 2021.

Grafica Veneta's huge 100,000sqm factory encompasses offset printing including nine web presses and two sheetfed models, as well as digital printing, and in-house binding. It handles runs from multi-millions to limited edition art books and overnight print-on-demand.

Grafica Veneta counts among its clients almost all the major Italian publishers and publishes among others the all versions of Harry Potter distributed around the world

The firm prints for many British publishers, with recent work including the Collins English Dictionary & Thesaurus and Irish Dictionary.

Towards the end of July 2021, she was investigated into the exploitation of Pakistan workers. Two leaders were placed under house custody. During the first Week of September 2021 both leaders have been released by court decision.
