= Mar Thoma Sleeha Syro-Malabar Catholic Cathedral (Bellwood, Illinois) =

Mar Thoma Sleeha Cathedral
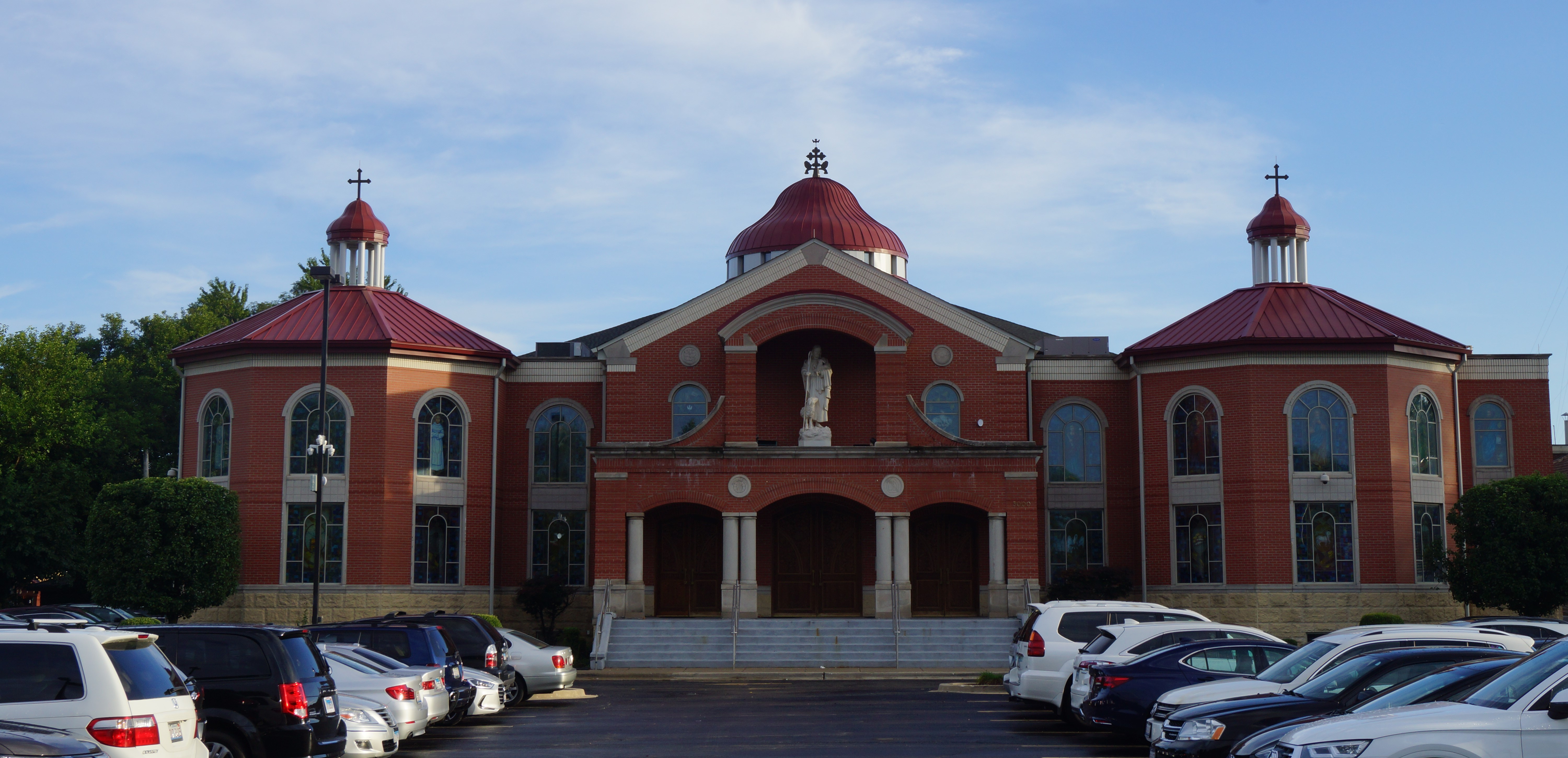

- Location within Illinois Location within the United States
- 41°53′16.66″N 87°53′38.53″W
- Location: 5000 St. Charles Rd. Bellwood, Illinois
- Country: United States
- Denomination: Syro-Malabar Catholic Church
- Website: smchicago.org

History
- Dedicated: July 5, 2008

Architecture
- Architect(s): Jaeger, Nickola & Associates
- Completed: 2008

Specifications
- Capacity: 1,165

Administration
- Diocese: St. Thomas Syro-Malabar Catholic Diocese of Chicago

Clergy
- Bishop: Joy Alappatt
- Vicar: Thomas Kadukappillil
- Priest(s): Fr. Josey Kuriakose Kollamparampil; Fr. Sam Kuttappassery; Fr. Michael James

Mar Thoma Sleeha Cathedral is a Syro-Malabar Catholic cathedral located in Bellwood, Illinois, United States. It is the seat for the St. Thomas Syro-Malabar Catholic Eparchy of Chicago. The church was dedicated on July 5, 2008, by Cardinal Mar Varkey Vithaythil. The grotto on the cathedral grounds was dedicated by Major Archbishop George Alencherry in October 2011.

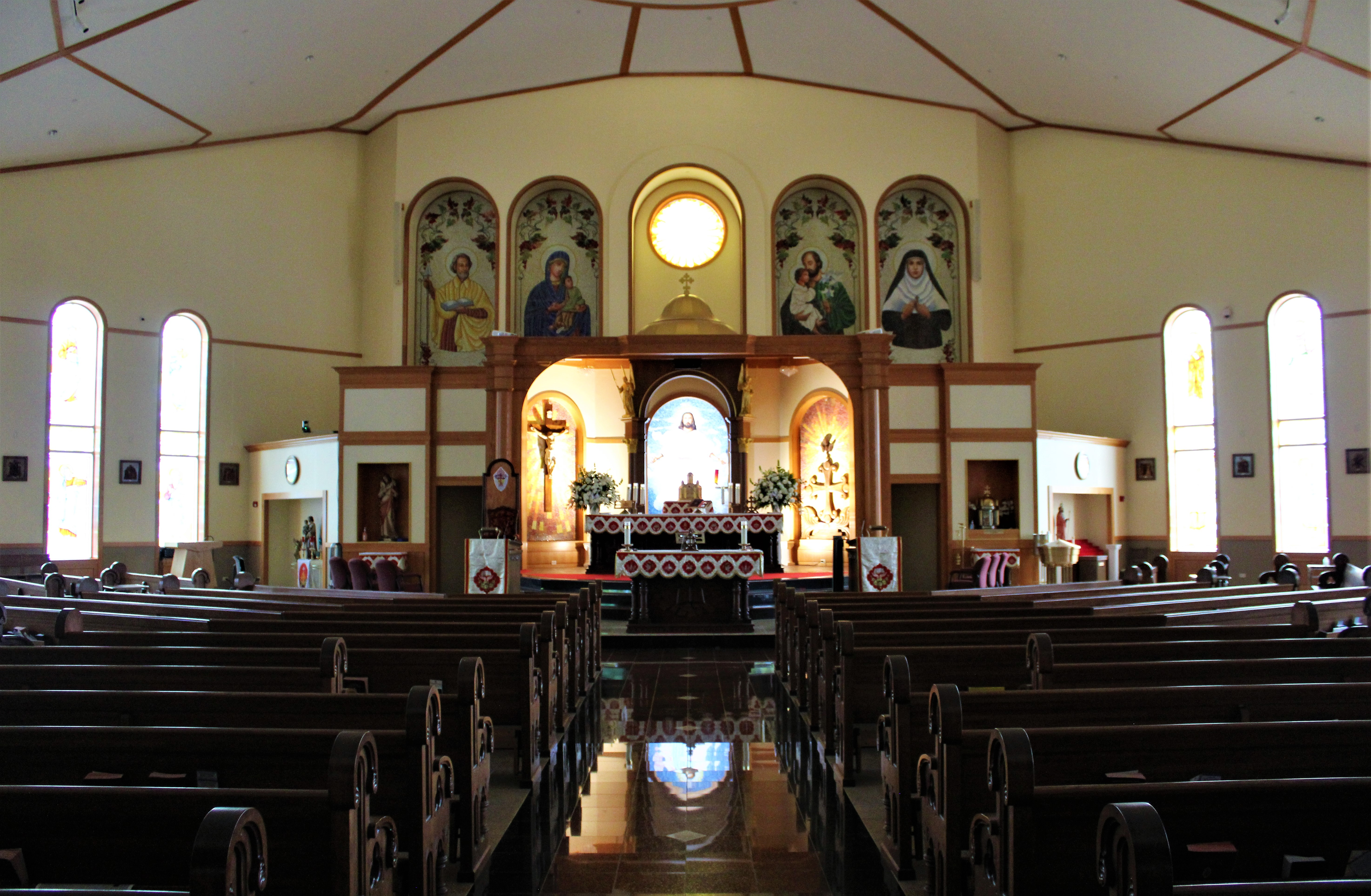
Interior

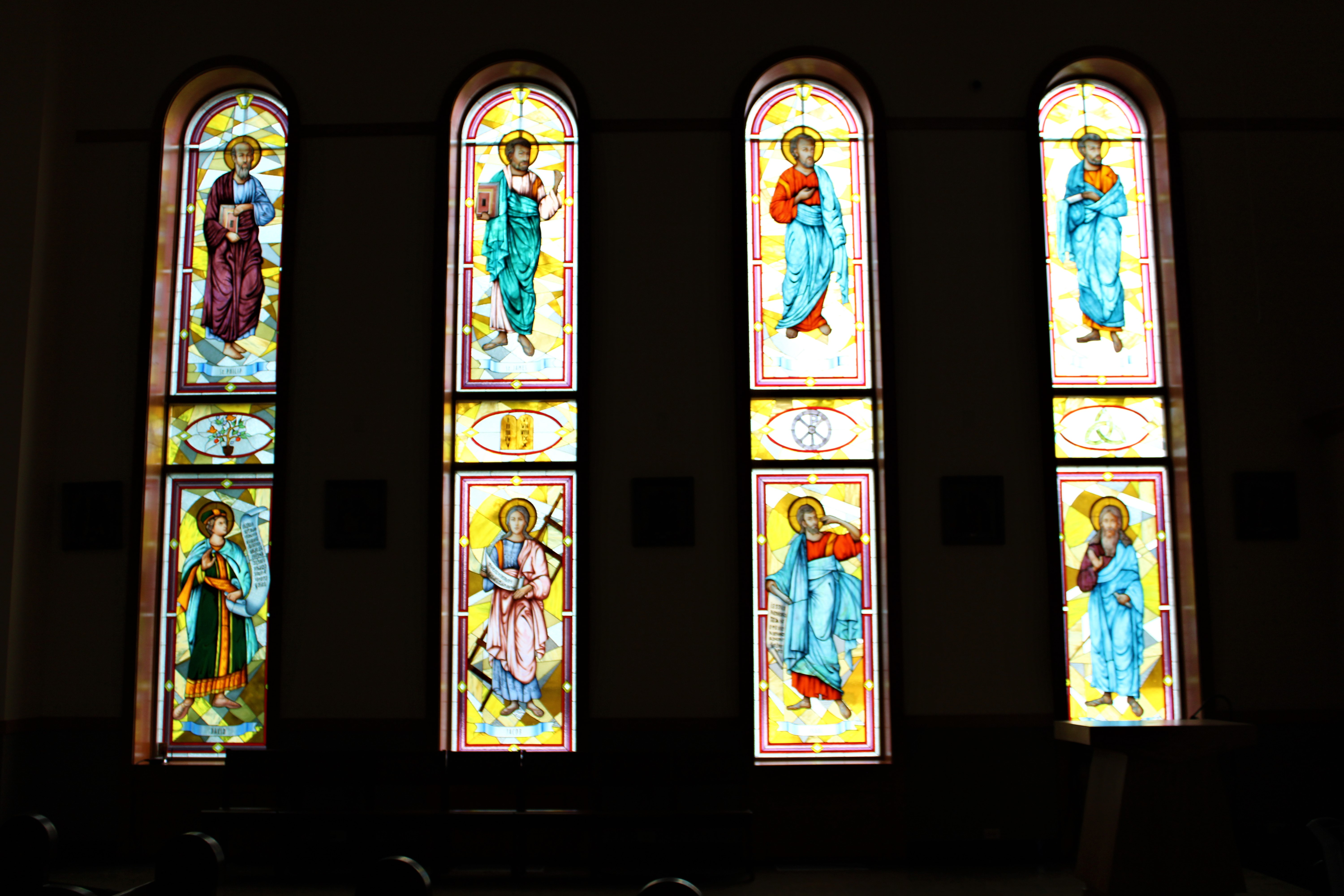
Stained glass windows

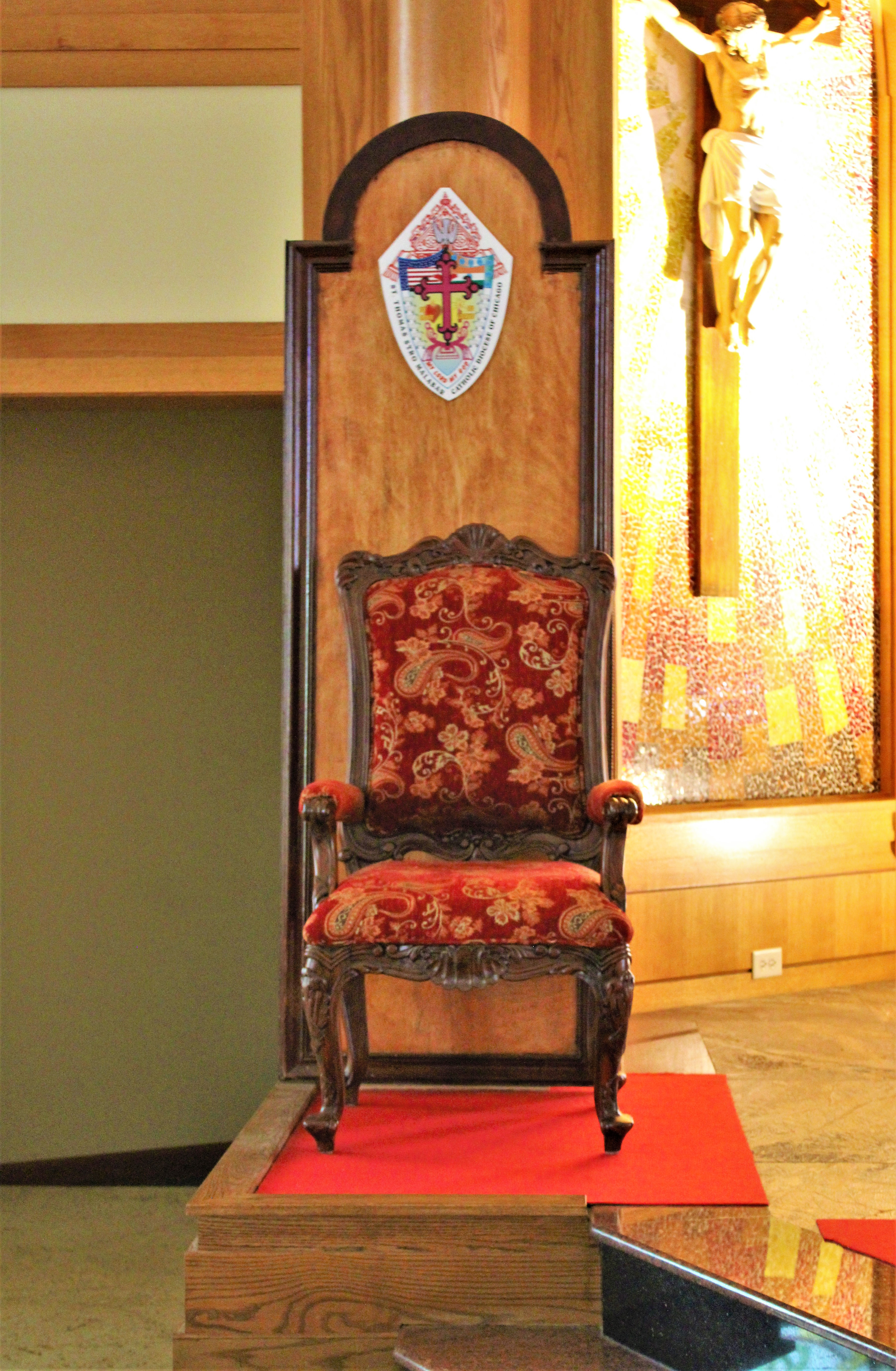
Cathedra

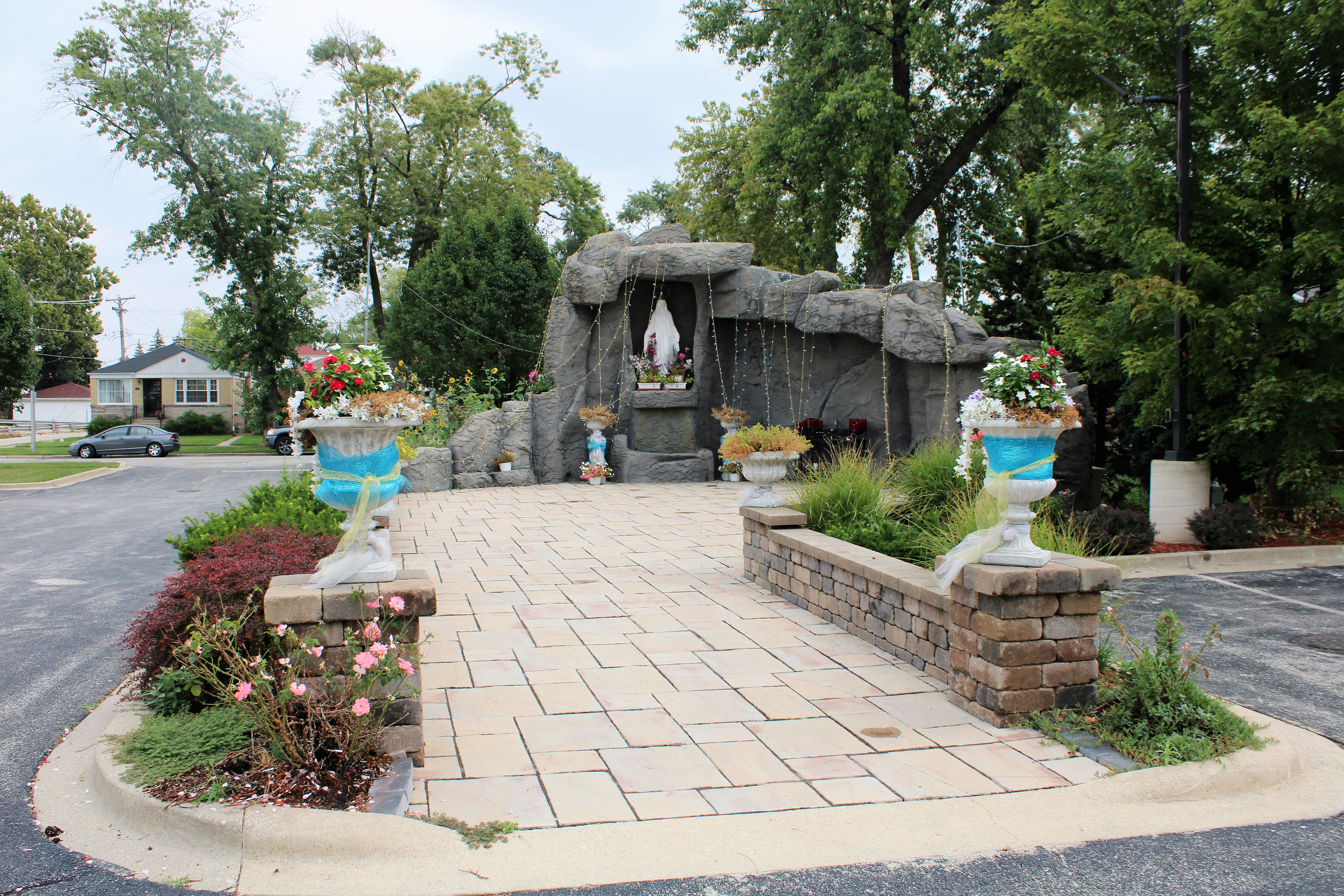
Marian shrine

== See also ==
- List of Catholic cathedrals in the United States
- List of cathedrals in the United States
