= Syro-Malabar Eparchy of Chicago =

Eastern Catholic ecclesiastical jurisdiction in the United States

Coordinates: 41°53′19″N 87°55′55″W

Eparchy of Saint Thomas the Apostle of Chicago Eparchia Sancti Thomae Apostoli Chicagiensis Syrorum-Malabarensium
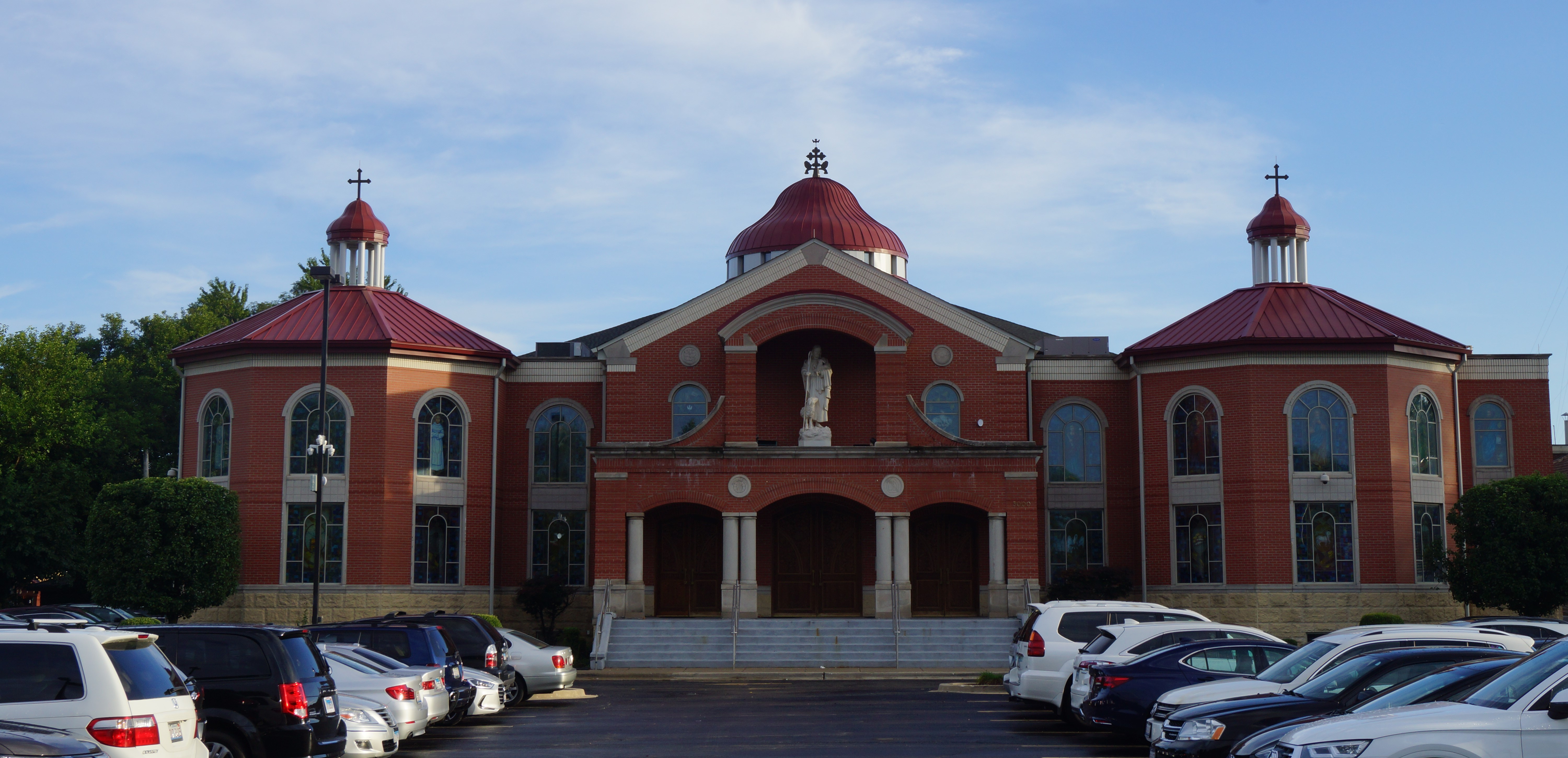
- Mar Thoma Sleeha Cathedral, Bellwood, Illinois

- Coat of arms

Location
- Country: United States
- Territory: United States
- Metropolitan: Exempt directly to Holy See and the Congregation for the Oriental Churches
- Headquarters: Diocesan Center; 310 W. Lake Street Elmhurst, IL 60126

Statistics
- Population: (as of 2022); 87,000
- Churches: 52
- Congregations: 35 (Missions)

Information
- Denomination: Catholic Church
- Sui iuris church: Syro-Malabar Church
- Rite: East Syriac Rite
- Established: March 13, 2001 (25 years ago)
- Cathedral: Mar Thoma Sleeha Cathedral
- Patron saint: Thomas the Apostle
- Language: Malayalam & English

Current leadership
- Pope: Leo XIV
- Major Archbishop: Raphael Thattil
- Bishop: Joy Alappatt
- Auxiliary Bishops: Vacant
- Vicar General: Thomas Mulavanal; Thomas Kadukappillil; John Meleppuram
- Bishops emeritus: Jacob Angadiath

Website
- www.stthomasdiocese.org

The Eparchy of St. Thomas Syro-Malabar Catholic of Chicago, also known as the St. Thomas Syro-Malabar Diocese of Chicago, is a Syro-Malabar Catholic Church ecclesiastical territory or eparchy of the Catholic Church in the United States. Its episcopal seat is the Mar Thoma Sleeha Cathedral in the episcopal see of Chicago.

Joy Alappatt became the bishop in October 2022. Jacob Angadiath was the bishop from its establishment in 2001 until his retirement in July 2022. The Eparchy is not part of any ecclesiastical province, and is immediately subject to the Holy See and depends on the Dicastery for the Oriental Churches.

The eparchy was erected by Pope John Paul II on 13 March 2001. It is one of the four eparchies of the Syro-Malabar Church outside India. In fact the Chicago Eparchy is the first ecclesiastical territory of the Syro-Malabar Church outside India. It has jurisdiction over all Syro-Malabar Catholics in the United States, including Knanaya Catholics in the US.

== History ==
The St. Thomas Syro-Malabar Catholic Diocese of Chicago was established on 13 March 2001 with pastoral jurisdiction over all the Syro-Malabar Church's members in the United States and appointed Jacob Angadiath as its first bishop; Angadiath was also appointed as the Apostolic Visitator to Canada.

== Bishops ==
The Bishop has the pastoral governance of the eparchy. Jacob Angadiath was appointed as the first bishop of the new eparchy in 2001. He served in the role for 21 years until his retirement in 2022. The Pope Named the Auxiliary Bishop of the Eparchy, Joy Alappatt as the Bishop-elect on July 3, 2022 (Feast of Durkanna), who was installed on October 1, 2022.

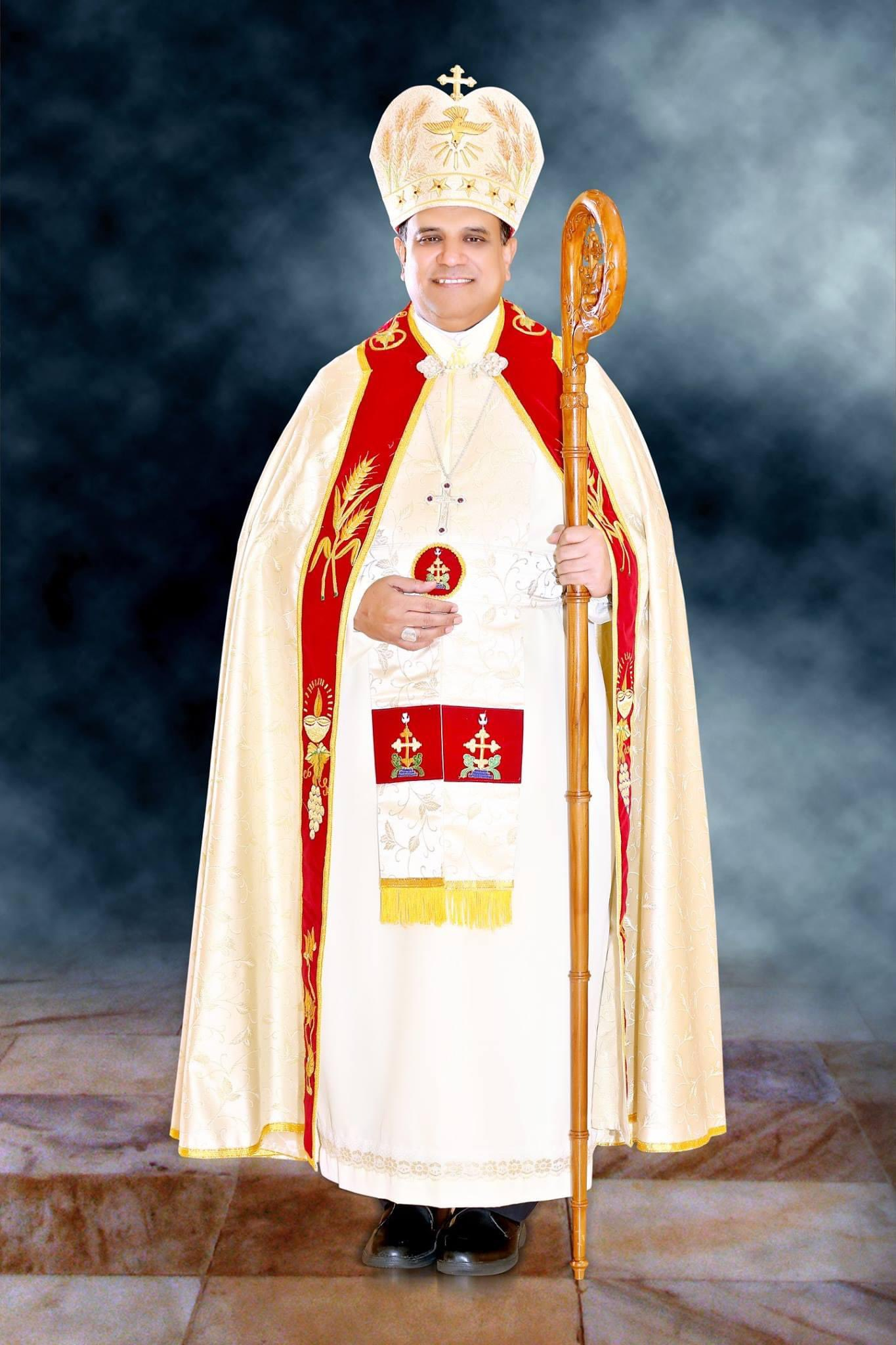
Joy Alappatt, the second bishop of the eparchy

=== List of Bishops ===
1. Jacob Angadiath (2001–2022)
2. Joy Alappatt (2022–present)

== Auxiliary Bishops ==
The Auxiliary Bishop has the role of assisting the Bishop in leading the eparchy and representing him if needed. Mar Thoma Sleeha Cathedral Rector and Vicar General of the Diocese Joy Alappatt was selected by Pope Francis as the first Auxiliary Bishop of the Diocese on July 24, 2022. The position became vacant when Alappatt was appointed as Bishop of the Eparchy.

=== List of Auxiliary Bishops ===
1. Joy Alappatt (2014–2022)

== Parishes and missions ==
The eparchy's cathedral is in Bellwood, Illinois, the Mar Thoma Shleeha Cathedral.

== See also ==
- List of the Catholic bishops of the United States#Other Eastern Catholic bishops
- List of the Catholic dioceses of the United States

== Bibliography ==
- Diocesan Directory 2013-14, St. Thomas Syro-Malabar Diocese of Chicago, 2014.
- Diocesan Directory 2016, St. Thomas Syro-Malabar Diocese of Chicago, 2016.
- Diocesan Bulletin, St. Thomas Syro-Malabar Diocese, 2001 October onwards.
- Enas, Dr. Enas A, An Eyewitness Account of The Syromalabar Story of Chicago Metropolis, Chicago: 2018.
- Kottukappally, George Joseph (Editor in chief), Commemorative Souvenir - 2001, Syro-Malabar Catholic Convention, Inauguration of the St. Thomas Diocese of Chicago, Episcopal Ordination of Mar Jacob Angadiath, Chicago: Mar Thomas Sleeha Cathedral, 2001.
- The Episcopal Ordination of Mar Joy Alappatt, Chicago: St. Thomas Syro-Malabar Catholic Diocese of Chicago, 2014.
