= Maywood station (Illinois) =

Commuter rail station in Maywood, Illinois

Maywood

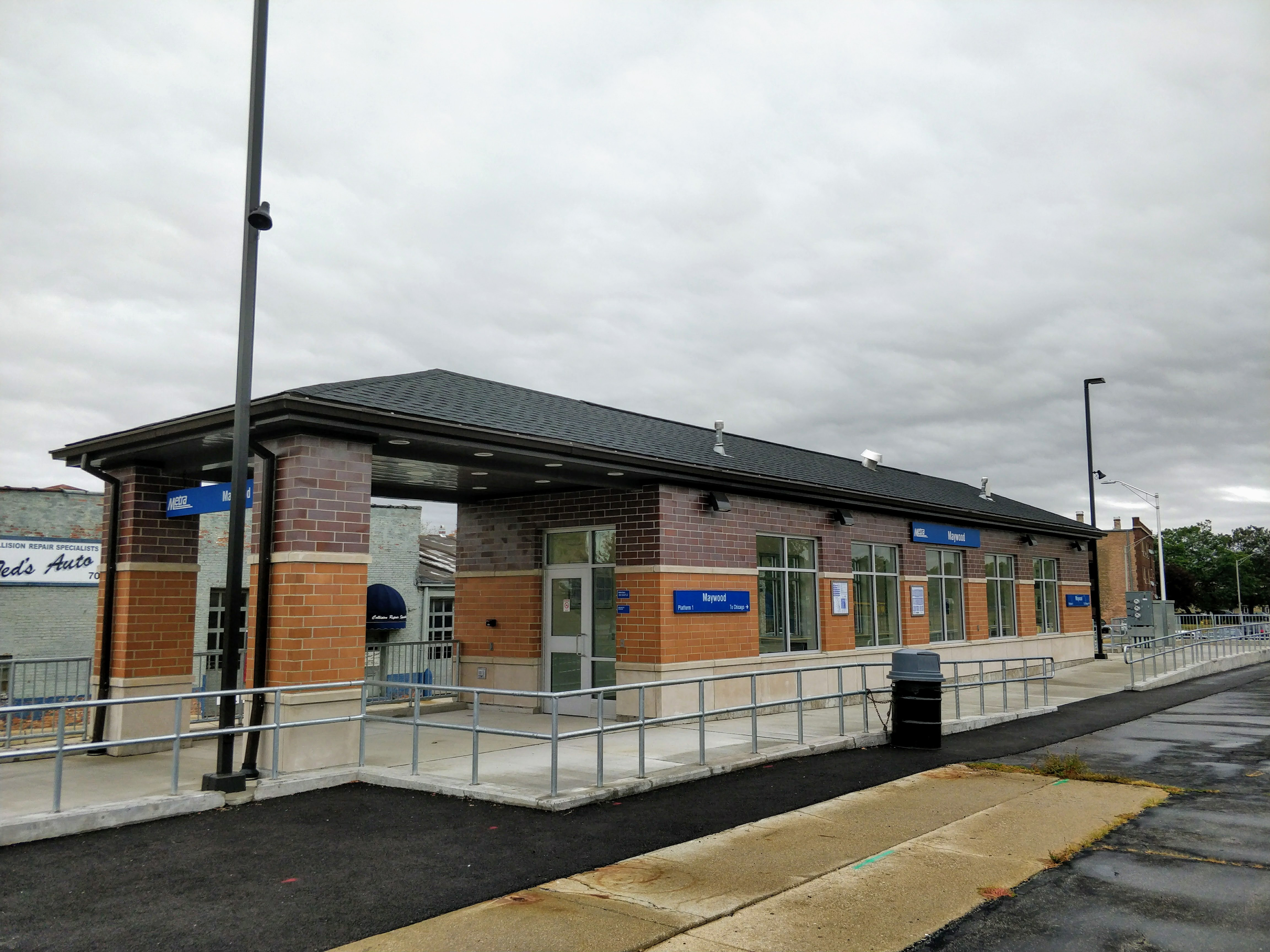
- The Maywood station platform in October 2017

General information
- Location: 430 Main St; Maywood, Illinois 60153
- Coordinates: 41.8884°N 87.8387°W
- Owner: Union Pacific
- Platforms: 2 side platforms
- Tracks: 3
- Connections: Pace Bus

Construction
- Accessible: Yes, partial (Note: At partially accessible stations, customers using mobility devices can access and use trains; however, the stations may not have other accessibility features such as accessible bathrooms, Braille signage, visual display announcements, etc.)

Other information
- Fare zone: 2

Passengers
- 2018: 87 (average weekday) ▲6.1%
- Rank: 194 out of 236

Services
Preceding station	Metra	Following station
Melrose Park toward Elburn	Union Pacific West	River Forest toward Ogilvie TC
Former services
Preceding station	Chicago and North Western Railway	Following station
Lombard toward Omaha	Main Line	Marion Street toward Chicago
Melrose Park toward Geneva	Galena Division	River Forest toward Chicago
Track layout
Location

Maywood is a Metra commuter railroad station in the village of Maywood, Illinois, United States, a western suburb of Chicago, on the Union Pacific West Line. Trains go east to Ogilvie Transportation Center in Chicago and as far west as Elburn, Illinois. Travel time to Ogilvie is 22 to 27 minutes. As of 2018, Maywood is the 194th busiest of the 236 non-downtown stations in the Metra system, with an average of 87 weekday boardings. Unless otherwise announced, inbound trains use the north platform and outbound trains use the south platform. The middle track does not have platform access.

As of September 8, 2025, Maywood is served by 43 trains (21 inbound, 22 outbound) on weekdays, by all 20 trains (10 in each direction) on Saturdays, and by all 18 trains (nine in each direction) on Sundays and holidays.

The station's parking is along Main Street between 1st Avenue to the east and 4th Avenue to the west. The station is in the heart of Maywood's business district. Across the tracks to the south of the station is the Maywood Public Library, the Maywood Police Station, and Veteran's Memorial Park, the Village's largest park. Pace suburban buses stop on North 5th Avenue and one block to the north on Lake Street.

The station was reconstructed to accommodate the addition of a third mainline track on the Union Pacific West Line in the 2010s. This resulted in the middle track at the station losing access to a platform, and this track is now solely used by Metra trains that do not stop at the station as well as Union Pacific freight trains.

A newly constructed station house opened on June 30, 2017.

== Bus connections ==
Pace

- 309 Lake Street
- 313 St. Charles Road
- 331 Cumberland/5th Avenue
