= Melrose Park station (Illinois) =

Commuter rail station in Melrose Park, Illinois

Melrose Park

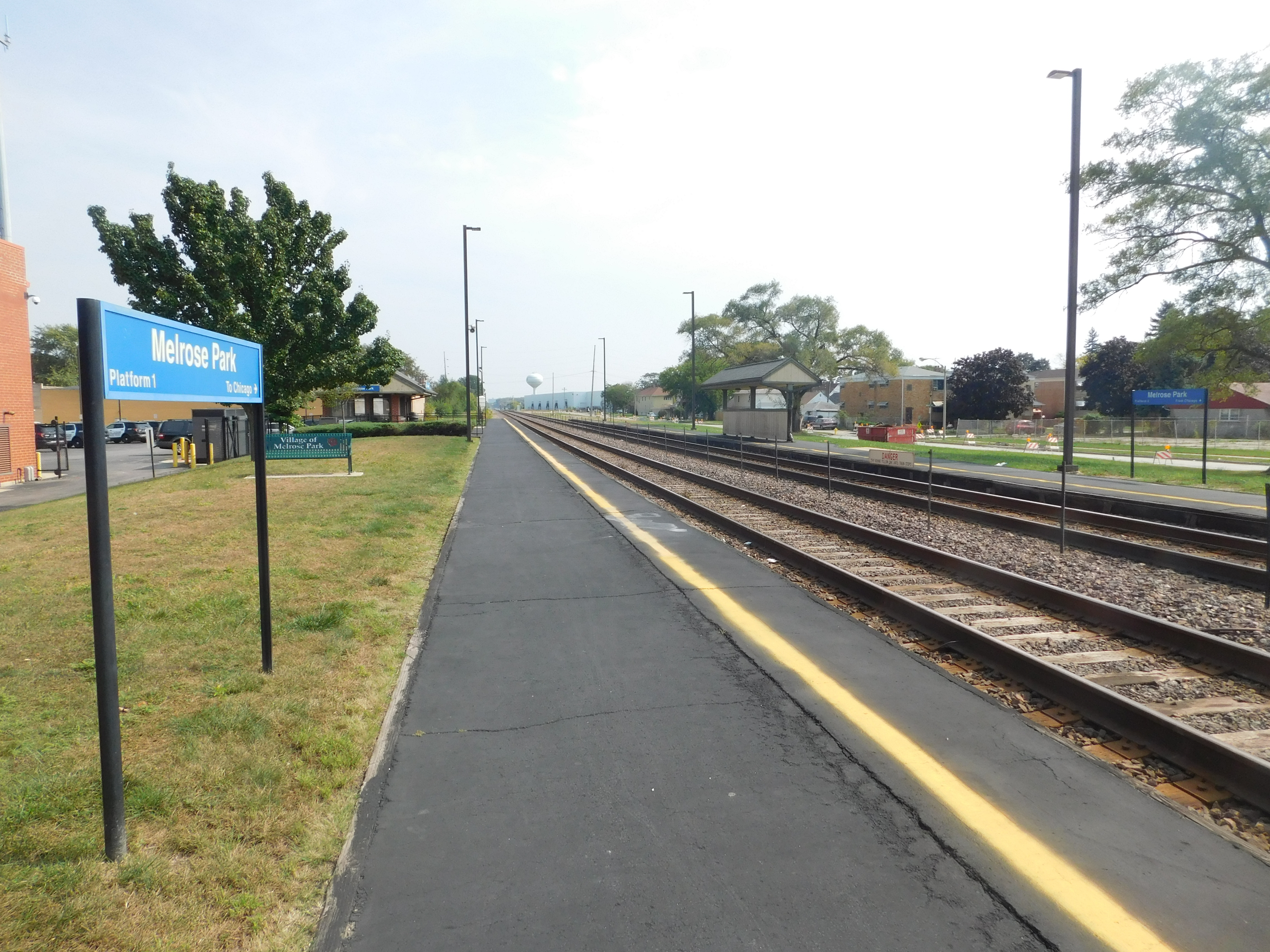
- Melrose Park station in September 2016

General information
- Location: 1801 West Main Street; Melrose Park, Illinois 60160
- Coordinates: 41.8903°N 87.8557°W
- Owner: Union Pacific
- Platforms: 2 side platforms
- Tracks: 3
- Connections: Pace Buses

Construction
- Accessible: Yes, partial (Note: At partially accessible stations, customers using mobility devices can access and use trains; however, the stations may not have other accessibility features such as accessible bathrooms, Braille signage, visual display announcements, etc.)

Other information
- Fare zone: 2

History
- Opened: 1956; 70 years ago

Passengers
- 2018: 86 (average weekday) ▼1.1%
- Rank: 196 out of 236

Services
Preceding station	Metra	Following station
Bellwood toward Elburn	Union Pacific West	Maywood toward Ogilvie TC
Former services
Preceding station	Chicago and North Western Railway	Following station
Bellwood toward Geneva	Galena Division	Maywood toward Chicago
Track layout
Location

Melrose Park is a Metra commuter railroad station in Melrose Park, Illinois, United States, a western suburb of Chicago. It is served by the Union Pacific West Line. Trains go east to Ogilvie Transportation Center in Chicago and as far west as Elburn, Illinois. Travel time to Ogilvie is 23 to 29 minutes, depending on the train. As of 2018, Melrose Park is the 196th busiest of the 236 non-downtown stations in the Metra system, with an average of 86 weekday boardings. Unless otherwise announced, inbound trains use the north platform and outbound trains use the south platform. The middle track does not have platform access.

As of September 8, 2025, Melrose Park is served by 43 trains (21 inbound, 22 outbound) on weekdays, by all 20 trains (10 in each direction) on Saturdays, and by all 18 trains (nine in each direction) on Sundays and holidays.

Melrose Park was originally built by the Chicago and North Western Railway and acquired by Metra. The station is at Main Street and North 18th Avenue, in Melrose Park's business district. Pace suburban buses stop one block to the west, on Broadway Street, and one block to the north, on West Lake Street.

The station was reconstructed to accommodate the addition of a third mainline track on the Union Pacific West Line in the 2010s. This resulted in the middle track at the station losing access to a platform, and this track is now solely used by Metra trains that do not stop at the station as well as Union Pacific freight trains.

== Bus connections ==
Pace

- 303 - Forest Park - Rosemont
- 309 - Lake Street
- 313 - St. Charles Road
