= Bellwood station (Metra) =

Commuter rail station in Bellwood, Illinois

Bellwood

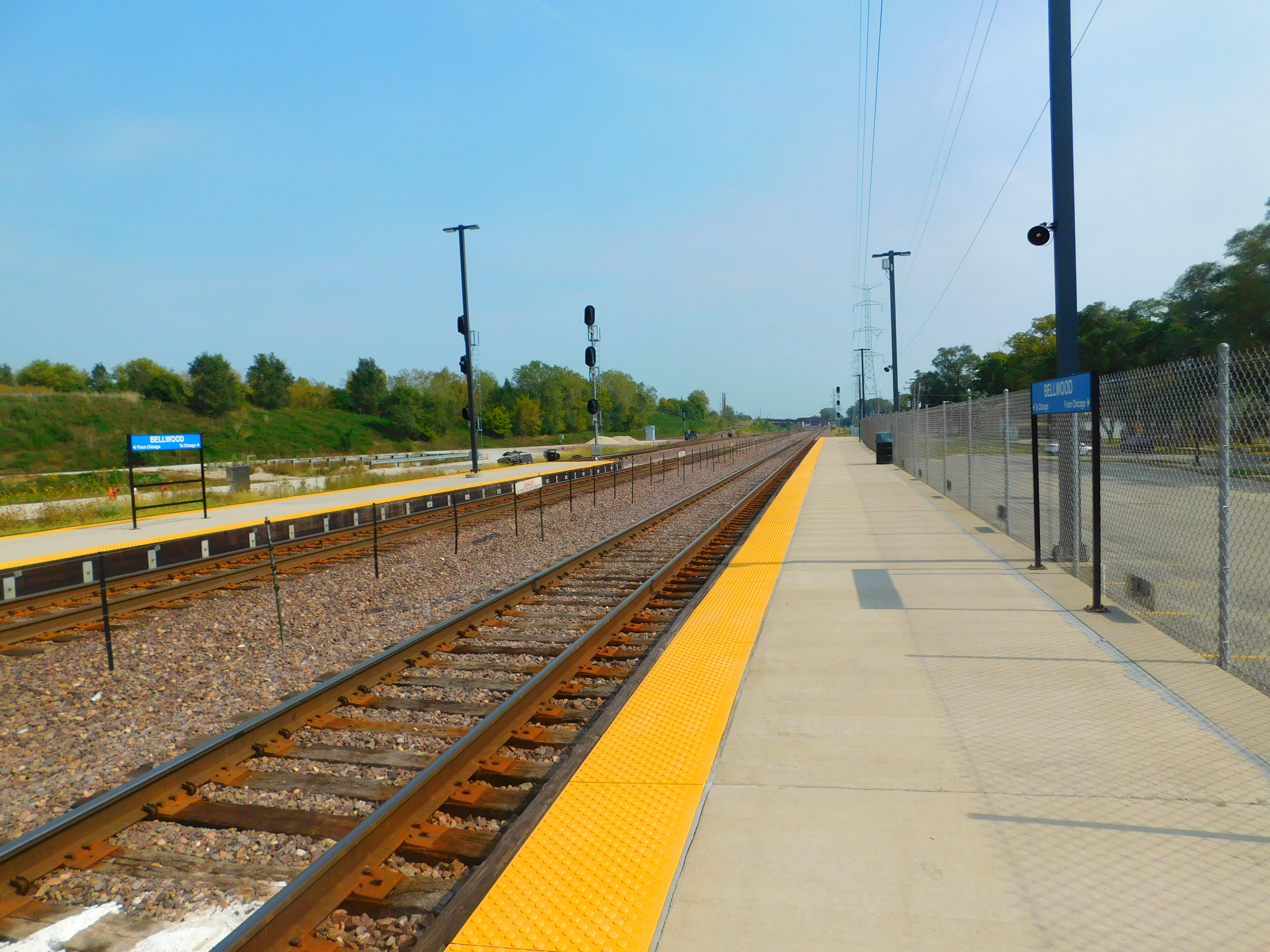
- Bellwood station in September 2016

General information
- Location: 105 Frederick Avenue; Bellwood, Illinois
- Coordinates: 41.8915°N 87.8826°W
- Owner: Union Pacific
- Platforms: 1 side platform, 1 island platform
- Tracks: 3
- Connections: Pace Buses

Construction
- Parking: Yes
- Accessible: Yes

Other information
- Fare zone: 2

History
- Opened: 1872; 154 years ago
- Rebuilt: 1953; 73 years ago, 2013; 13 years ago

Passengers
- 2018: 145 (average weekday) ▼2%
- Rank: 173 out of 236

Services
| Preceding station | Metra | Following station |
|---|---|---|
| Berkeley toward Elburn | Union Pacific West | Melrose Park toward Ogilvie TC |
Former services
| Preceding station | Chicago and North Western Railway | Following station |
|---|---|---|
| Berkeley toward Geneva | Galena Division | Melrose Park toward Chicago |
Track layout
Location

Bellwood is a Metra commuter railroad station in Bellwood, Illinois, a western suburb of Chicago. It is served by the Union Pacific West Line. Trains go east to Ogilvie Transportation Center in Chicago and as far west as Elburn, Illinois. Travel time to Ogilvie is 26 to 33 minutes, depending on the train. As of 2018, Bellwood is the 173rd busiest of the 236 non-downtown stations in the Metra system, with an average of 145 weekday boardings. Unless otherwise announced, inbound trains use the north (island) platform and outbound trains use the south (side) platform.

As of September 8, 2025, Bellwood is served by 43 trains (21 inbound, 22 outbound) on weekdays, by all 20 trains (10 in each direction) on Saturdays, and by all 18 trains (nine in each direction) on Sundays and holidays.

The station is at Frederick Avenue and Erie Street. To the south there is a parking lot and a residential neighborhood of single-family homes. The Union Pacific Railroad's Proviso Yard is north of the station. Immediately to the west there is an overpass that carries Mannheim Road over the freight yard. Pace suburban buses stop on Mannheim Road and on St. Charles Road, one block to the south of the station. To the east of the station is the Indiana Harbor Belt railroad bridge over the UP-W line that Union Pacific trains cross over to go into Proviso Yard.

The station was formerly a two-track facility. As part of the CREATE Program project B2, the station gained a third track and pedestrian underpass tunnel in 2013.

== Bus connections ==
Pace

- 313 St. Charles Road
- 330 Mannheim/LaGrange Roads
