= Bellwood School District 88 =

School district in Illinois, United States

Address
- 640 Eastern Avenue Bellwood, Illinois, 60104; United States
- Coordinates: 41.879636°N 87.873782°W

District information
- Type: Public
- Grades: PreK-8
- Superintendent: Dr. Victoria H. Stockton
- Schools: 7
- NCES District ID: 1705760

Students and staff
- Students: 2,200
- Teachers: 175
- Student–teacher ratio: 18:1

Other information
- Website: sd88.org

Bellwood School District 88 (SD88) is a pre-kindergarten through eighth grade school district located in the western suburbs of the Chicago metropolitan area. It operates seven schools that educate over 2,000 students from the municipalities of Bellwood, Broadview, Hillside, Melrose Park, and Stone Park.

== Schools ==
Primary Schools:

- Lincoln Primary/Early Childhood Center
- Grant Primary

Elementary Schools:

- Grant Elementary School
- Lincoln Elementary School
- McKinley Elementary School
- Thurgood Marshall Elementary School

Middle School:

- Roosevelt Middle School
