= Bellwood, Illinois =

- Village
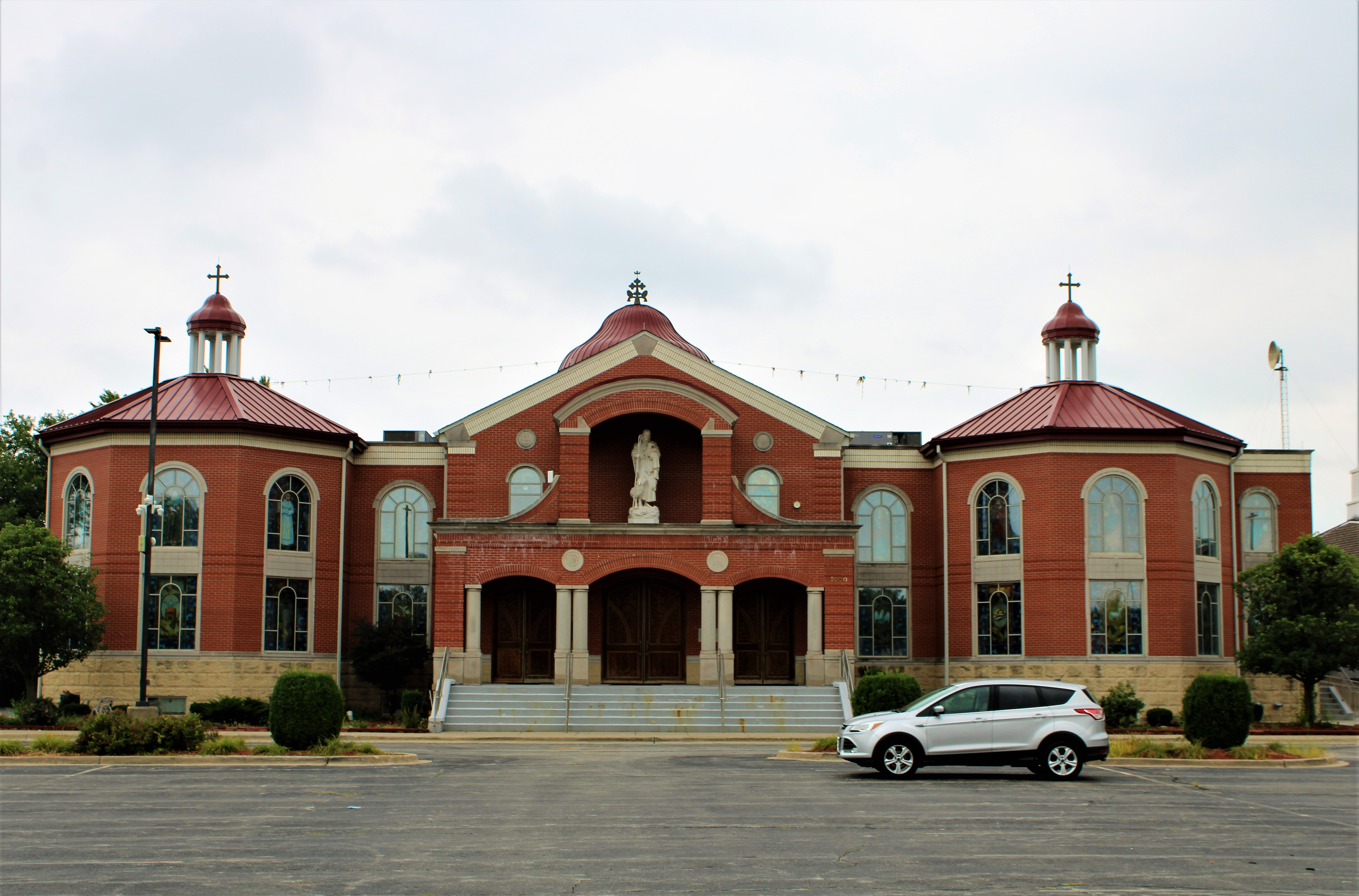
- Mar Thoma Sleeha Cathedral

- Flag logo
- Motto: "Your Family Is Our Future"
- Location of Bellwood in Cook County, Illinois.

- Location within Greater Chicago Location within Illinois Location within the United States
- Coordinates: 41.882924°N 87.876428°W
- Country: United States
- State: Illinois
- County: Cook
- Township: Proviso
- Incorporated: 1900

Government
  - Mayor: Andre F. Harvey

Area
  - Total: 2.40 sq mi (6.21 km^{2})
  - Land: 2.40 sq mi (6.21 km^{2})
  - Water: 0 sq mi (0.00 km^{2})

Population (2020)
  - Total: 18,789
  - Density: 7,834.8/sq mi (3,025.05/km^{2})
- Time zone: UTC-6 (CST)
  - Summer (DST): UTC-5 (CDT)
- ZIP Code(s): 60104
- Area codes: 708/464
- FIPS code: 17-04975
- Website: www.vil.bellwood.il.us

Bellwood is a village in Proviso Township, Cook County, Illinois, United States. Located 13 miles (21 km) west of Chicago's downtown Loop, the Village of Bellwood is bounded by the Eisenhower Expressway (south), the Proviso yards of the former Chicago & Northwestern, now Union Pacific Railroad (north), and the suburbs of Maywood (east) and Hillside and Berkeley (west). The population was 18,789 at the 2020 census.

== History ==
Bellwood was incorporated on May 21, 1900. The municipality took its name from one of the village's early subdivisions, "Bellewood". However, in later years, the final "e" was dropped. The region, which was mostly flat grassland, was initially mostly farmland. A few businesses, including a few taverns, were drawn to the initial subdivision. In reaction to dry Maywood's effort to annex the area, businesses that served alcohol petitioned for incorporation. Between 1900 and 1930, Bellwood's population numbers increased steadily. By 1920, the village's population of 943 had more than quadrupled, with many German and Russian immigrants. The increase to 4,991 persons in 1930 is due to the annexation of territory west of Mannheim Road in 1926, as well as ongoing migration.

The Chicago, Aurora and Elgin Railway and the Chicago & North Western Railway provided rail passenger service, which promoted residential growth in neighboring portions of Bellwood. The 1970s saw racial upheaval and inclusion in a Supreme Court case in the United States. Bellwood sued a local real estate company in 1975, alleging racial discrimination. Four years later, the Supreme Court issued a historic decision allowing governments to utilize testers and sue when discrimination occurs. The black population of Bellwood jumped from 1.1 percent in 1970 to 35 percent in 1980 and 70 percent in 1990.

A few major firms exist in Bellwood today, but the collapse of many other large sectors has resulted in a decrease in employment and tax revenue. Despite these contributions, the community saw some new development as a result of various minor industrial and commercial organizations.

== Geography ==
According to the 2021 census gazetteer files, Bellwood has a total area of 2.40 square miles (6.22 km^{2}), all land.

== Demographics ==
Historical population
Census	Pop.	Note	%±
1910	943		—
1920	1,881		99.5%
1930	4,991		165.3%
1940	5,220		4.6%
1950	8,746		67.5%
1960	20,729		137.0%
1970	22,096		6.6%
1980	19,811		−10.3%
1990	20,241		2.2%
2000	20,535		1.5%
2010	19,071		−7.1%
2020	18,789		−1.5%
U.S. Decennial Census; 2010-2020

=== Racial and ethnic composition ===
Bellwood village, Illinois – Racial and ethnic composition Note: the US Census treats Hispanic/Latino as an ethnic category. This table excludes Latinos from the racial categories and assigns them to a separate category. Hispanics/Latinos may be of any race.
Race / Ethnicity (NH = Non-Hispanic)	Pop 2000	Pop 2010	Pop 2020	% 2000	% 2010	% 2020
White alone (NH)	1,803	907	545	8.78%	4.76%	2.90%
Black or African American alone (NH)	16,673	14,240	12,705	81.19%	74.67%	67.62%
Native American or Alaska Native alone (NH)	20	16	19	0.10%	0.08%	0.10%
Asian alone (NH)	189	116	119	0.92%	0.61%	0.63%
Native Hawaiian or Pacific Islander alone (NH)	3	1	2	0.01%	0.01%	0.01%
Other race alone (NH)	5	26	65	0.02%	0.14%	0.35%
Mixed race or Multiracial (NH)	211	169	300	1.03%	0.89%	1.60%
Hispanic or Latino (any race)	1,631	3,596	5,034	7.94%	18.86%	26.79%
Total	20,535	19,071	18,789	100.00%	100.00%	100.00%

=== 2020 census ===
As of the 2020 census, Bellwood had a population of 18,789 and 4,310 families residing in the village. The population density was 7,835.28 inhabitants per square mile (3,025.22/km^{2}).

The median age was 39.6 years. 21.6% of residents were under the age of 18 and 16.4% were 65 years of age or older. For every 100 females there were 89.5 males, and for every 100 females age 18 and over there were 85.7 males.

There were 6,351 households in Bellwood, of which 35.2% had children under the age of 18 living in them. Of all households, 37.5% were married-couple households, 16.2% were households with a male householder and no spouse or partner present, and 40.2% were households with a female householder and no spouse or partner present. About 22.4% of all households were made up of individuals and 9.9% had someone living alone who was 65 years of age or older. The average household size was 3.79 and the average family size was 3.09.

There were 6,757 housing units, of which 6.0% were vacant. The average housing unit density was 2,817.76 per square mile (1,087.94/km^{2}). The homeowner vacancy rate was 2.8% and the rental vacancy rate was 6.1%. 100.0% of residents lived in urban areas, while 0.0% lived in rural areas.

=== Income and poverty ===
The median income for a household in the village was $63,006, and the median income for a family was $69,730. Males had a median income of $38,361 versus $32,466 for females. The per capita income for the village was $27,244. About 8.3% of families and 11.1% of the population were below the poverty line, including 13.1% of those under age 18 and 12.3% of those age 65 or over.

== Government ==
Andre F. Harvey is the current and Bellwood's first African-American mayor.

=== List of mayors of Bellwood ===
Mayors of Bellwood, Illinois

Image	Mayor	Years	Notes
	?	–	
	Donald P. Lemm	1993–2001	
	Frank A. Pasquale	2001–2017	
	Andre F. Harvey	2017–present	First African American mayor

== Education ==
The Bellwood School District 88 comprises seven schools: Grant Primary School, Grant Elementary School, Lincoln Primary–Early Childhood Center, Lincoln Elementary School, McKinley Elementary School, Thurgood Marshall Elementary School and Roosevelt Middle School. Some portions are zoned to Berkeley School District 87.

MECA Christian Academy is a private school.

== Infrastructure ==
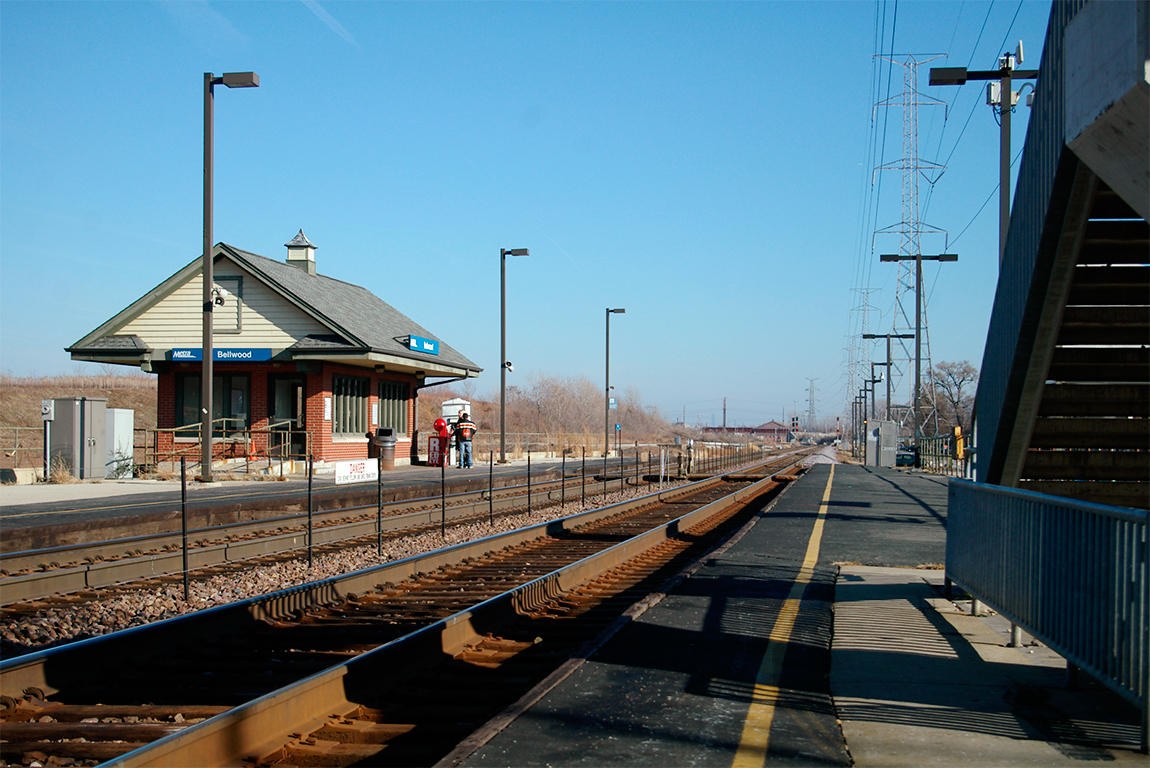
Bellwood station

=== Transportation ===
The village is serviced by a Metra railroad station with commuter service to Chicago. Trains from Bellwood station travel east to Ogilvie Transportation Center in Chicago, and west to Elburn station. Bus service in the village is provided by Pace. The Chicago Transit Authority provided bus passenger services for Bellwood until 2012 when it discontinued the #17 route.

In November 2011, Union Pacific Railroad announced plans to renovate and upgrade Bellwood's Metra station and add a third rail line. The project, estimated at $4 million, was expected to be completed by the fall of 2012 at no cost to residents. Bellwood formerly had a station on the Chicago Great Western Railway main line before it was abandoned in 1968 by the Chicago & Northwestern Railway. The Indiana Harbor Belt Railroad runs through Bellwood, but does not host any commuter rail traffic.

== Notable people ==
- Lee J. Archambault, NASA astronaut, served aboard two space shuttle missions (STS-117 & STS-119)
- Eugene Cernan, NASA astronaut, commander of the Apollo 17 mission and "last man on the Moon." He was a childhood resident of Bellwood.
- Robert Covington, small forward who last played for the Philadelphia 76ers, was born in Bellwood.
