= Kedzie =

Kedzie may refer to:

== People with the surname ==
- John H. Kedzie (1815–1903), American lawyer, real-estate developer, and politician; a figure in the history of Chicago
- Robert C. Kedzie (1823–1902), American author of a book about poisonous wallpaper
- Frank S. Kedzie (1857–1935), American academic, president of the Michigan Agricultural College 1915–1921
- Julie Kedzie (b. 1981), American mixed martial artist
- Neal Kedzie (b. 1965), American politician from Wisconsin; state legislator

== Places ==
- Kedzie Avenue, a street in Chicago, Illinois, United States
  - Kedzie–Homan station
  - Kedzie station (CTA Brown Line)
  - Kedzie station (CTA Garfield Park branch)
  - Kedzie station (CTA Green Line)
  - Kedzie station (CTA Orange Line)
  - Kedzie station (CTA Pink Line)
  - Kedzie station (Metra)
- Kędzie, a village in Poland
