= Elsie Paroubek =

American child murder victim (1906–1911)

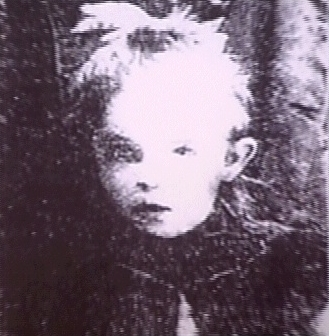
- A photograph of Paroubek from the May 9, 1911, edition of the Chicago Daily News
- Born: Eliška Paroubek; 1906; Chicago, Illinois, U.S.
- Died: c. April 8, 1911 (aged 4); Chicago, Illinois, U.S.
- Cause of death: Homicide by asphyxiation or strangulation
- Body discovered: May 9, 1911; Chicago, Illinois, U.S.
- Resting place: Bohemian National Cemetery, Chicago, Illinois, U.S.

Eliška "Elsie" Paroubek (1906 – c. April 8, 1911) was an American girl who was a victim of kidnapping and murder in the spring of 1911. Her disappearance and the subsequent search for her preoccupied Illinois, Wisconsin, and Minnesota law enforcement for six weeks. Her funeral was attended by between 2,000 and 3,000 people.

The story of the girl's death, and especially her photograph in the Chicago Daily News, were inspirations for Henry Darger's immense fantasy novel In the Realms of the Unreal.

== Background ==
Eliška (Elsie) was born in Chicago in 1906. Her mother, Karolína Vojáčková, was born on November 26, 1869, in Míčov, within the former Čáslav district, Bohemia, Austria-Hungary (now the Czech Republic). Elsie's father, František (Frank) Paroubek was a laborer, born on December 15, 1867, in Podhořany u Ronova, of the same district.

František married Karolína at her village's Catholic church on 16 February 1892. The couple had a son, Karel, and immigrated to America through the Port of Baltimore with the family of Karolína's sister on 12 April 1895, en route to her brother in Chicago. Several other close relatives apparently moved to Chicago as well. In the United States, Frank worked as a painter while Karolina maintained the home. Though the couple christened 2 of their children at St. Procopius Church, by the turn of the century, they left Catholicism to become freethinkers; therefore the remaining children were not baptized (nor were their births apparently registered with the city) and Eliška's exact birthdate is unknown. She was supposedly their eighth child according to the 1900 and 1910 census records, having at least 3 siblings who died prematurely. (Note: The other children were Karel (Charles) (1895–1896), Julia Anna (1896–1967), Frank (1898–1899), Bernice (Bessie) (1900–1962 according to her headstone), m. Frank Joseph Krizek (1893-1953), Milada (Mildred) (1902–1987), František (Frank) (born 1904), and Anastasia (Anna) (born 1909).) (Note: Mildred is listed in the Social Security death records as a Berwyn/Forestview/Stickney (Chicago suburbs) resident with a birth date of August 13, 1902 and death date of April 1987.) At the time of the 1910 census on April 21, 1910, Eliška was said to be 3 years old. At the time of her death, she was estimated to be 4 years old according to her gravestone, together suggesting a possible birthdate between April 22, 1906, and April 8, 1907.

In census and newspaper accounts, particularly in the Chicago Daily News, Paroubek is frequently spelled "Parobek". Frank is sometimes referred to as "Peter" or "John," and Karolina is sometimes called "Mary." Elsie is also called "Mary" or "Emily" in the Rockford, Illinois newspapers.

== Disappearance ==
On the morning of April 8, 1911, Elsie Paroubek left her home at 2320 S. Albany Avenue in Chicago, (Note: Several newspaper accounts give the address as 2820 S. Albany Avenue.) telling her mother she was going to visit "Auntie", Karolina's sister Julia Trampota, (Note: Julia is listed as having been born in about 1876. She died in 1937.) around the corner at 2325 S. Troy Street. (Note: The Chicago Daily News initially reported, "Shortly before 3 o'clock Saturday afternoon, her mother left her sitting on the front porch of the Porobek [sic] home. An hour later when her mother went to call her, she was gone, and no trace has been found of her since.") Turning left on 23rd St. and left again on Troy, she encountered her nine-year-old cousin, Josie Trampota, and a number of other children who were listening to an organ grinder a short distance from Mrs. Trampota's gate. (Note: The idea that organ grinders, who were often Italians, routinely kidnapped children and held them for ransom was as widespread a stereotype as that of Romani people abducting children: these non-Anglo foreigners were frequently accused of such "Black Hand" crimes, whether true or not. Margaret Sidney's bestseller Five Little Peppers And How They Grew, published in 1881 and a standard of children's literature by 1911, had as its core event a child Elsie's age kidnapped by an organ grinder. See also Ilaria Sera's The Imagined Immigrant: Images of Italian Emigration to the United States between 1890 and 1924 (Rosemont, 2009).) When the organ grinder moved to the 23rd St. corner, the children followed him, but subsequently left while Elsie remained behind. Several hours later, Elsie's mother went to her sister's house to find Elsie had never arrived. As Elsie had many friends in the area, the women assumed she was visiting at another home, perhaps to spend the night and return the next morning. At 9 pm that evening, Frank Paroubek returned from work and went to police at the Hinman Street station to report her missing. Police initially agreed that she was likely spending the night with friends, but when she had not returned by the following morning, Captain John Mahoney took personal charge of the search.

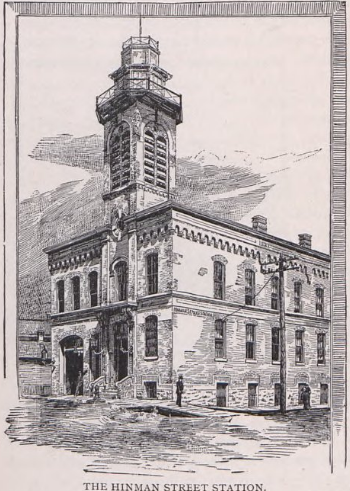
Chicago's Hinman Street police station, engraving from 1889. The station house stood at the corner of Hinman and Paulina streets and housed the 23rd Precinct.

Romani people, as identified by the Rockford, Illinois press, were suspected after a neighborhood child, John Jirowski, told detectives from the Maxwell Street station led by inspector Stephen K. Healey that he had seen a wagon he associated with Romani people on Kedzie Avenue, a block west of Troy Street, with two women holding a little girl. The Chicago American repeated this story with the added detail that the girl seemed to be trying to get away and was being restrained; also, that police had reason to believe this was a "Black Hand" kidnapping.

There were several Romani camps along the Des Plaines River near Kedzie and these were searched. Residents told investigators that one wagon had decamped and left on the morning of April 9. The theory that Elsie had been abducted by people identified in contemporary reports as Romani gained traction because her disappearance closely resembled that of Lillian Wulff, who had been found among Romani people four years earlier. Elsie's father, Frank Paroubek, offered his life savings, $50 (about $1,547 today), as a reward. Inspector Healey also ordered that drainage canals be dragged for the child's body on April 15, and Governor Charles S. Deneen asked the public to aid in the search. It was at about this time that Elsie's friend Emma Kubat, 14, told police she had last seen Elsie with the organ grinder. Detectives from the Maxwell Street station searched the Italian quarter at West 14th and S. Halsted Streets, where it had been reported a child matching Elsie's description had been seen with an organ grinder.

A full-length photo of Elsie appeared on the front page of the April 12 Chicago American. This photo, enhanced by artists, reappeared many times in the paper. On April 17, it was accompanied by photos of Frank, Karolina and Elsie's sister Julia.

== Investigation ==
Detectives Joseph, Komorous, and Sheehan accompanied Frank Paroubek in his search for the departed wagon which was initially believed to be headed for Round Lake, Illinois, a village about 50 miles northwest of Chicago, where seven wagons were camped. Farmers in the area were alerted to be on watch. When local residents started asking camp residents about Elsie and attempted to search the wagons, they broke camp again and moved on to Volo, Illinois, 43 miles from Chicago. Volo residents reported a child matching Elsie's description and said she appeared to be "stupefied" or "drugged" and partly covered with a blanket. They also attempted to search the wagons, but the camp residents immediately broke camp and departed for McHenry, Illinois, about 60 miles northwest of Chicago. When police caught up with them at McHenry, they discovered the little girl was a camp resident and did not match Elsie's description. Meanwhile, Police Capt. Mahoney assigned men to drag the drainage canals near Elsie's home on April 12 and again on the 15th.

In several instances, a child was found in a camp who did resemble Elsie, such that even Frank was momentarily certain it was his daughter and it would take some time to convince him it was a mistake. As late as April 24, when a little girl somewhat resembling Elsie's description was found in a Romani camp near 18th and South Halsted Streets, Frank fell to his knees and prayed.

The reason for her capture was attributed by police to "the natural love of the wandering people for blue-eyed, yellow-haired children". Elsie was consistently described as small, with light golden hair and blue eyes, wearing a red one-piece dress, laced shoes, and black stockings.

The little girl is described as having long curly golden hair, blue eyes, and pink chubby cheeks with a prominent dimple in each. At the time she disappeared, she wore a red hat, a red dress, black stockings, and high top black boots.

— Chicago Daily News, April 12, 1911

She was a very pretty child and passing strangers often stopped to pass admiring comment upon her.

— Rockford Daily Gazette, April 21, 1911

On April 17, Police Capt. Mahoney received an anonymous phone tip that a child answering Elsie's description had been seen accompanying a man to a Western Springs, Illinois, hotel. Again, detectives dispatched to the hotel found nothing. Sycamore, Illinois, police Chief Ogden accompanied Frank Paroubek to investigate wagons associated with Romani camps at Cherry Valley, Illinois, but found no child even remotely resembling Elsie. Meanwhile, Hinman Street police fielded reporters' questions about a $500 (nearly $16,114 in 2022) ransom note received by Karolina. They "denied official knowledge of the communication, but admitted it might be true." (Note: The Oklahoma City Daily Oklahoman for April 21 reported the ransom note item as fact.)

On April 20, neighbors saw Frank Jr., age 6, lugging a pick and shovel out into South Troy Street and start digging. Upon inquiry, Frank said there had been a lot of construction on the street the day Elsie disappeared, and he had heard his parents discussing the possibility that she had fallen into a hole. And if she struggled to climb out, she might have been buried under falling sand and gravel. Workers still fixing the street said that it was possible, but they would have noticed immediately. Meanwhile, people in the West End and a woman in Kings, Illinois, reported sightings of light-skinned girls traveling with Romani groups.

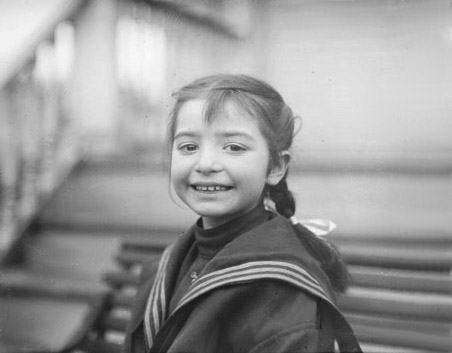
Lillian Wulff, who advised police on how to proceed in case Elsie Paroubek had been abducted by Romani people. Chicago Daily News negatives collection, DN-0003451. Courtesy of Chicago History Museum.

In the second week after Elsie's disappearance, Lillian Wulff, age 11, came forward to offer assistance. Wulff herself had been the subject of a similar manhunt four years earlier. She was reportedly abducted by Romani people and held for six days, working as a beggar, until discovered walking behind a Romani wagon by a farmer outside Momence, Illinois. (Note: Researching the disappearance of Catherine Winters, author Charlene Perry came to believe that Lillian's abductors were not Romany after all. The abductors, William and Irene Jones, were indigents who could not find work due to William's extensive criminal record. His wife, Irene, claimed he had stolen children to work as beggars before. Lillian, however, appears to have believed that the Joneses were Romani, likely because they had been described that way in the press.) She provided details of her experience of her abductors' typical behavior, and volunteered to lead a "rescue party". (Note: "I believe I could help a lot... O, I could lead the police there. I know every tree on that road. I remember it all. I dream about it lots of times.") William Jones, Lillian's kidnapper, suggested asking Elijah George, whom he described as the "King of the Gypsies," about Elsie. Elijah George was found in Argyle, Wisconsin, and was brought to Joliet but "failed to give the desired information", and was released. At that point, Inspector Healey again ordered the drainage canal dragged, along with a search of all wells and other places where Elsie could have fallen.

On April 22, Gov. Deneen released a front-page statement to the Chicago American calling on "every person" to aid in the search. Also on April 22, John Muts, the town marshal for Trevor, Wisconsin, received a phone call regarding a blonde child in a nearby Romani camp. Muts, along with saloonkeeper Carl Czdenek of Lyons, Illinois, met with the girl and Czdenek said he was able to speak with her in Czech and verify that she was Elsie. A Mrs. Alice Gould of nearby McHenry also identified the child as Elsie and said Romani people had attempted to abduct other children in the area.

By April 23, Lt. John Costello of the Hinman Street station told reporters that every "kidnapping" clue had been exhausted. He was sure Elsie had been "attacked and mistreated", was now dead, and her body hidden in the cellar of an empty house or deserted barn. He brought detectives to begin investigating empty buildings, barns, sheds, elevators, catchbasins, and basements on or near South Albany Avenue. Several of the detectives brought spades planning to dig in every plot of earth that appeared to have been recently disturbed. Inspector Healey joined in this search along with Detectives Perry and Egan. At the same time, Costello sent two officers to the outskirts of the city on a lead which he had received by telephone but refused to reveal to reporters. Capt. Stephen Wood of the detective bureau had all wagons associated with Romani camps and wrote to every police official in the vicinity of Belvidere, Rockford and Janesville, Wisconsin to be on the lookout for Elsie. However, he too was now certain Elsie was either being held for ransom, had been in an accident and was either dead or in some hospital, unable to speak, or had been "slain by some degenerate" from one of the shanties in the alley near her home.

Also on April 23, a neighbor told police that she had last seen Elsie around 11:00 on the morning she disappeared, still with the organ grinder and engaged in conversation with a man on the opposite side of the street whom the neighbor did not know.

The following day's Chicago Daily News devoted a full column to the search, calling it "one of the most extensive and far-reaching quests ever made for a missing child." Twenty police officers and one hundred volunteers were involved in Lt. Costello's search, covering a radius of about a mile of the Paroubek home. It was judged to be "one of the most remarkable investigations of its kind" because of the intense public interest, but also due to the huge number of child volunteers. Many described themselves not just as casual acquaintances or playmates, but as friends of Elsie. These children offered to look into "out of the way places" for Elsie or evidence leading to her whereabouts.

On April 29, Inspector Healey sent a detective to Zion City, Illinois, in response to a long-distance phone tip from the Zion City deputy sheriff. Once again, a child resembling Elsie was reported at a Romani camp, and once again police determined that the child was a Romani girl and not Elsie.

By April 30, the superintendent of schools, Mrs. Ella Flagg Young, had requested that all schoolchildren in the Chicago area organize neighborhood searches during spring break. Meanwhile, Frank Paroubek, in desperation, consulted a psychic who said that Elsie was in "Argo, Wisconsin" (possibly meaning to say Argyle, Wisconsin).

Chicago politician Charles J. Vopicka sent officers to the area she indicated, to no avail. (Note: "Sharp eyes and keen wits of 230,000 school children are enlisted in the search for Elsie Paroubek, kidnapped from her home a month ago. The public school children, with the sanction of Mrs. Ella Flagg Young, have been set at work to aid in finding the stolen girl. Parties are being organized among the children for systematic search of all parts of the city. The kidnapping of the little Paroubek girl has caused the introduction into the Illinois legislature of a bill authorizing the state to offer rewards in kidnapping cases as they now can for the apprehension of a murderer.") The search "jumped from Illinois to Wisconsin, and from Wisconsin to Minnesota, and then back again to Illinois", with no luck.

A few days after Elsie's disappearance, Frank Paroubek began to receive anonymous, "insulting" letters. They were all written in English, which he could not read, so he asked neighbors to translate. The letters claimed that Elsie was hidden away by someone who "hated" the Paroubeks, accusing them of mistreating her. Frank was so infuriated by the accusation that he burned the letters. Nonetheless, Detectives Zahour and Zalasky attempted to follow up on this lead.

The Czech community rallied to support the Paroubeks. All Czech-speaking policemen were put into plain clothes and assigned to the investigation. The Chicago American revealed that not only Czech speakers were involved in this "international squad", but police officers Dagulski (Polish), Arens and Richter (German), McCauley (Irish) and Alexander (English) were assigned because they each spoke several languages and would be better able to question "every man, woman and child in the camps." The women's auxiliary of the Club Bohemia assisted in the search, creating an "endless chain letter" which was mailed to all parts of the city, with a request for recipients to mail copies to everyone they knew. Various Czech-American politicians became involved. The Bohemian Charitable Association conferred with Mayor Carter Harrison, Jr. on April 22, then announced they would offer a reward of $500 and however much more could be raised. Mayor Harrison contributed $25 and sent out a special police squad from City Hall. A detachment also operated out of the Lawndale Avenue station in cooperation with the Hinman Street police. Anton Cermak, then a Chicago alderman, said that if Miss Paroubek were not found by the time of the next city council meeting May 1, he would call upon the city council to offer an even larger reward. At that time, state laws did not allow the offering of a reward for the apprehension of kidnappers as it did for murderers. (Note: "Emergency legislation permitting Governor Deneen to offer a reward for the safe return of Elsie Paroubek... was started in the general assembly at Springfield yesterday.") On April 26, Governor Deneen said he planned to ask the legislature to revise the statutes so that a reward could be offered by the State of Illinois in addition to the personal reward fund.

Judge Adolph J. Sabath held several interviews with Elsie's family and also contributed $25 to the reward fund. By May 2, he had increased his contribution to $100 and arranged meetings with Czech societies to find ways to increase the fund.

Many sightings of girls in a red dress living in a Romani camp were phoned in to police and followed up. By May 1, police had all but abandoned the idea that she had been abducted by Romani people, and were returning their efforts to searching wells and dragging canals. Judge Sabath objected saying that the police hunt was becoming "listless" because Elsie's parents were poor. He was being "swamped" with mail, most of it containing contributions to the reward fund, from all over the country, and increased his personal contribution to $100.00 as well. Among the letters was one from Dr. G.T. Screeton of Carlisle, Arkansas, which read in part: "Dear Judge: In relation to the strange disappearance of Elsie Parobek, I will say that a band of forty gypsy men and four gypsy women with eighteen children ranging in age from three months to eighteen years were seen in the union station at Little Rock, Arkansas last week. All these children looked as if they were not of gypsy parentage."

Meanwhile, Detectives Zahour and Zalasky sought a man residing near Madison and Robey streets, the suspected author of the anonymous, threatening letters Frank Paroubek had received. Lt. Costello, supported by Inspector Healey, flatly declared: "Elsie Paroubek fell into the drainage canal from the Kedzie Avenue bridge or near it. She was not murdered." They believed the author of the letters to have witnessed this.

By May 7, twenty-five Romani had been searched and many false leads followed. Police Capt. Mahoney announced his belief that Elsie was dead and that police would continue to search for her body.

Also on May 7, Judge Sabath ordered an investigation of Frank and Karolina themselves, in search of anything in their past that might have caused someone to kidnap Elsie.

== Discovery ==
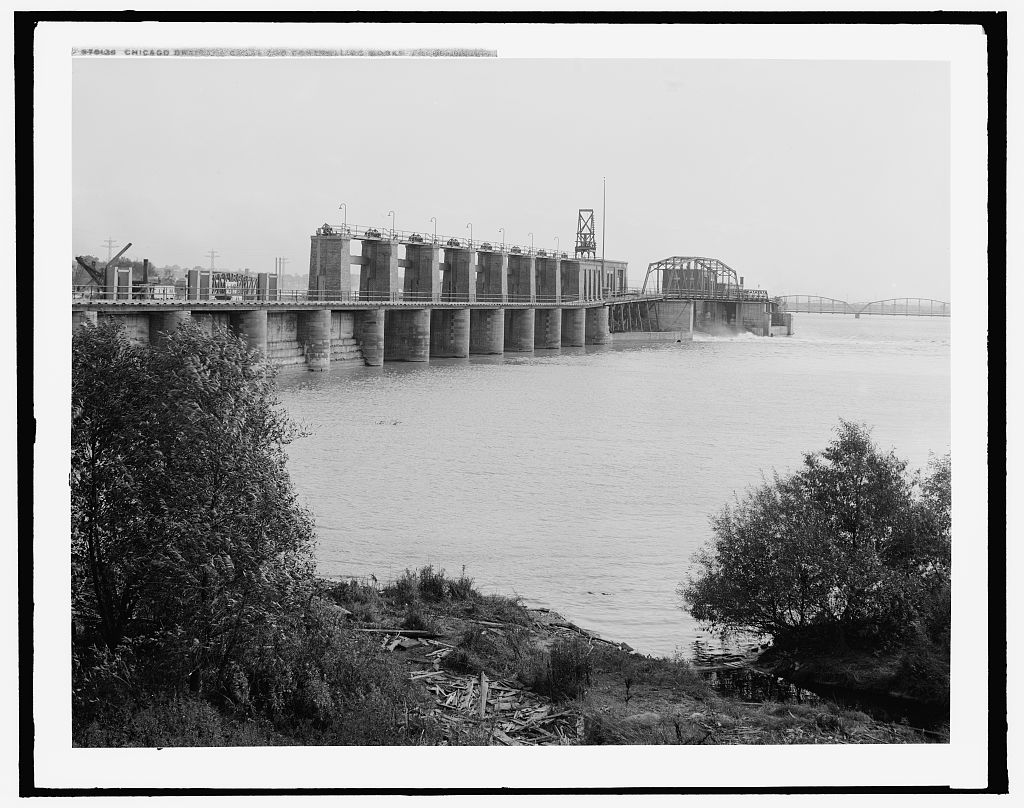
Black-and-white photo of the Chicago drainage canal near the Lockport power plant. Taken between 1898 and 1910. Elsie's body was found in this area. Source: Library of Congress file #4a22397.

On May 8, 1911, electrical engineer George T. Scully and other employees of the Lockport power plant near Joliet, thirty-five miles outside of Chicago, saw a body floating in the Chicago Sanitary and Ship Canal. At first, they thought it was an animal from one of the nearby farms, but three hours later, realizing it was a human being, sent out a boat to bring it to shore. Undertaker William Goodale, examining the body, said that it appeared to fit Miss Paroubek's description: "The description tallied to the shade of the hair, the texture of the stockings, and the stuff and tint of the dress of little Elsie." He thought the body had been in the water for several weeks, although only slightly decomposed. Another report indicated that her body was "badly decomposed" but there were "no marks of violence" on her body.

Goodale notified Chicago authorities who sent Police Lt. Costello to the Paroubek home. Karolina Paroubek cried "Mé drahé dítě!" (English: "My dear child!") and begged to be told Elsie was alive. Frank was taken to the Goodale funeral home at midnight. He said, "The clothes look like Elsie's. But the face -- I can't recognize it. Her mother alone can tell." Another newspaper reported that Frank immediately said "That's Elsie," and began to cry.

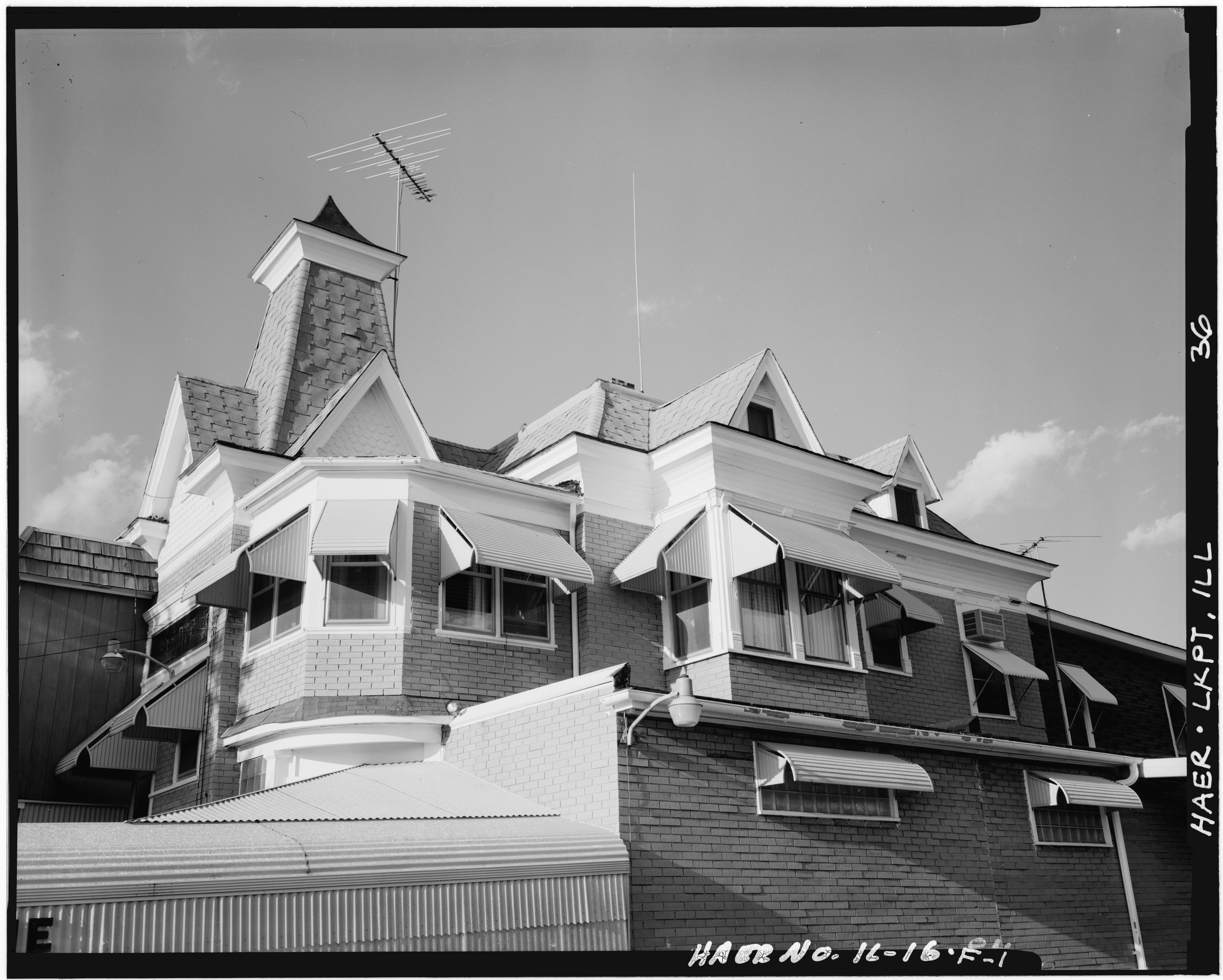
Goodale Memorial Chapel, 912 S. Hamilton Street, Lockport, Illinois. Elsie's body was taken here. This funeral home is still in operation. Source: Wikimedia Commons.

Karolina arrived at the funeral home by trolley car the following morning and positively identified Elsie, saying "It's you, my darling. Thank God we've found you and you're not in the hands of the gypsies." For the next hour, she paced or sat nervously in an adjoining room with Frank holding her hands, weeping, and praying. Goodale, who had kept track of the disappearance in the papers, made this statement to police: "The body appears to have been in the water for about a month, which tally with the date of Elsie Paroubek's disappearance. The child, when she left home, was without hat, and her clothing tallies in every respect with that found on the dead body. There was no ring or other ornament, and in that respect, the descriptions correspond. Excepting only as to the color of the eyes, which cannot be clearly observed as to color, the descriptions are identical."

Arrangements were quickly made for an inquest. The jury consisted of F.W. Wurst, Christian Radchiero, John A. Walter, William Woodale, Edwin Murray, and Patrick O'Brien. Coroner William Wunderlich of Will County officiated.

As the post-mortem examination began, Frank Paroubek was the first witness. Disregarding questions put to him by the coroner, Frank plunged into charges his daughter had been murdered. Through a translator, he asserted "I am sure the gypsies stole my girl and then when they knew we were after them, they killed her and threw her body into the canal."

At this, Karolina ran from the funeral parlor screaming "My Elsie is dead. She was murdered, murdered." Her husband and Det. Zelasky tried to calm her, but in her extreme distress she began running up and down the street, drawing a crowd of curious onlookers. She insisted she had known for three weeks that Romani people had killed Elsie. Frank consoled her and assisted her boarding a trolley car for home.

Meanwhile, the coroner said: "This case has attracted such attention that a minute examination will be made. We will be content with no perfunctory inquest such as this. The jury will refuse to state its convictions -- for it has none -- until after the autopsy has been held. We want the stomach of the little girl examined, and the lungs as well. The father charges murder. It is certainly possible that he is right."

Two physicians, E.A. Kingston and W.R. Paddock, confirmed that there was no water in her lungs, so she had not drowned. Kingston said she had been "attacked" (often a euphemism for rape) and murdered before her body was thrown into the water. Paddock said there was every evidence she had been "wounded" before being killed. Lt. Costello later told the press that she had been "mistreated," seeming to indicate this meant her death was not the work of Romani people, and Inspector Healy added, "there seems to be no doubt that she was abused in the most fiendish way, and that fact established, the case is much simplified for the police." They also found "deep cuts" on the left side of her face. Although these men reported "blue marks on the throat as though the victim had been choked," another examination by Drs. E.R. LeCount and Warren H. Hunter of the Coroner's Office revealed that Elsie had been suffocated, not strangled, and there were "no distinct marks of violence on the body." Despite this, newspaper headlines reporting the coroners' findings continued to report Elsie as strangled. The official cause of death was marked "unknown." Coroner Peter Hoffman concurred with Mr. Paroubek as to the probable circumstances of Elsie's death.

"It is our belief that the abductor of the child suffocated her to death, possibly by putting a hand over her mouth." The coroner's report recommended that officials continue to investigate. Inspector Healey immediately detailed detectives to find out exactly what had happened. He told the Chicago Inter Ocean: "I have forty detectives at work today on the theory that the criminals lived in the neighborhood of the Paroubek home. We are investigating every incident of the lives of the Paroubeks since they came to Chicago in order to trace a possible enemy. It will surprise me if the criminals are not arrested within a week." To the Chicago Tribune he stated, "We have one or two theories, but nothing specific enough to even talk about. I intend to place more men on the case tomorrow." Lt. Costello returned to investigating the anonymous letters. Meanwhile, the New York Times reported Hoffman's and Paroubek's theory as fact.

On the evening of May 9, Karolina was calmer and gave an interview upon returning home. Surrounded by friends and neighbors she told reporters, "Before the doctors found that Elsie's lungs were free from water and discovered reasons for believing she had been strangled, I knew she had been murdered. A picture of the crime has been in my mind since the second week of her disappearance, and I am convinced that when the truth is known, as it surely will be, it will be shown that she was choked to death a week from April 8 when she was kidnapped on her way to visit her 'auntie.'" Karolina called upon authorities to find and punish the killers.

Following the inquest, Elsie's body was brought home. Her uncle Frank Trampota took charge of the funeral arrangements. Karolina told Judge Sabath that the search had exhausted the family's savings and they had no money to bury her. Judge Sabath gave her a check for $25 promising to raise more funds. Friends and family members continued to collect money for the Paroubek fund. Mrs. Sophie Johanes raised over $50 by giving a benefit party and soliciting donations from Bohemians on the West Coast.

== Funeral ==
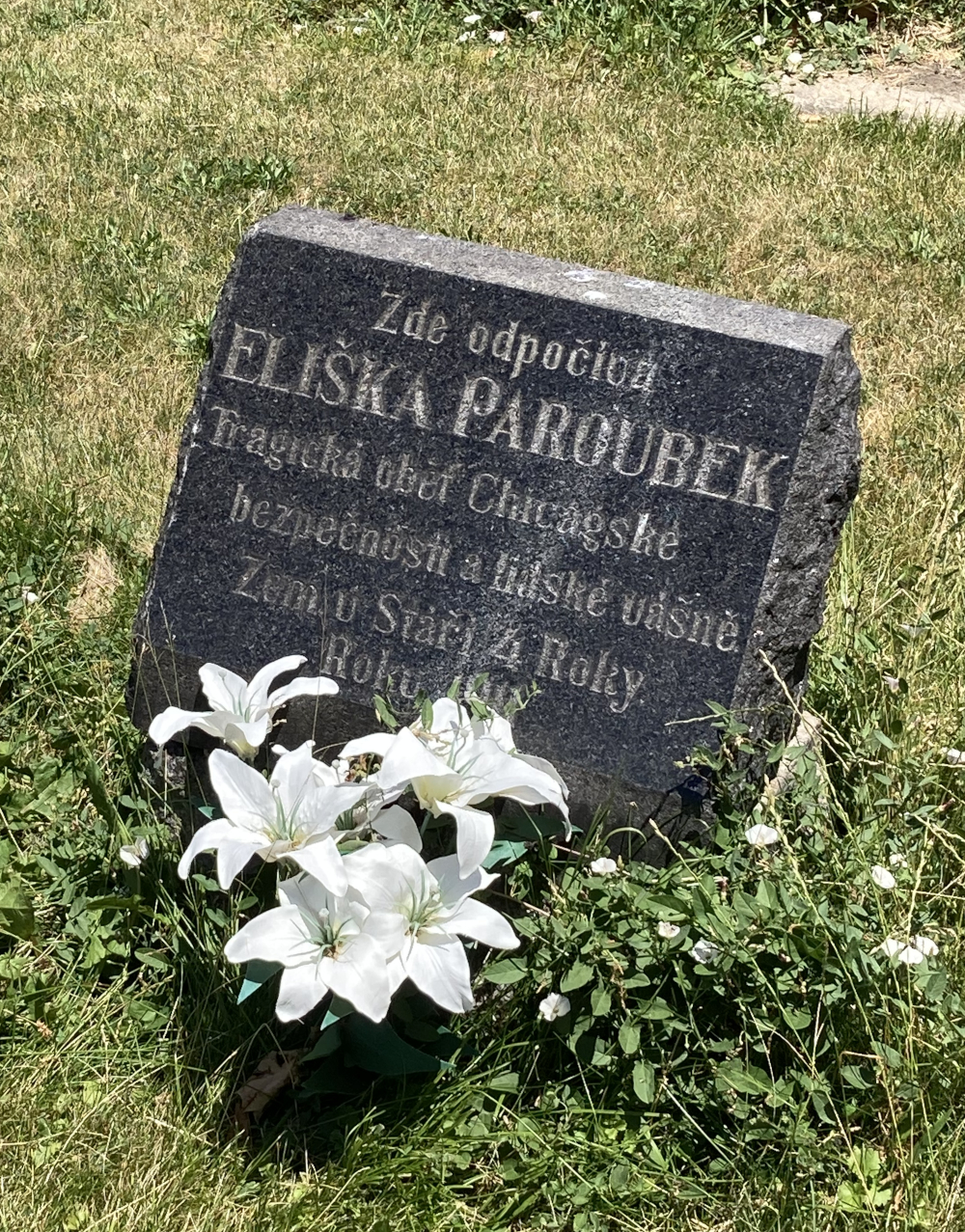
Paroubek's grave at Bohemian National Cemetery

Elsie Paroubek's funeral was held at 10:00, on the morning of May 12, 1911, on the lawn of the Paroubeks' home and attended by between 2,000 or 3,000 people. The Chicago Inter Ocean newspaper, however, gave the number of attendees as 5,000. Hours before the ceremony, Albany Avenue and the Paroubek back yard, along with the balconies and porches of nearby houses, were filled with mourners. There was no hall in the neighborhood large enough to hold them all. Frank had been offered the use of a hall, but he indicated the huge gathering and said "They have come to say goodbye to my Elsie. Don't let them be disappointed." Reserves from the Hinman Street station were called in to keep order and prevent the crowd from breaking down the fence.

Elsie's white coffin rested on two brass stands, surrounded by lilies of the valley, roses and carnations sent by Mayor Harrison, Judge Sabath and other city officials. Eight little girls dressed all in white, including Josie Trampota and her sister Mary, brought out huge sprays of lilies and roses and encircled the bier. Someone brought two chairs out of the Paroubek home, set them near the casket, and laid a board across them to hold the hundreds of floral offerings. Karolina was seated at the head of the coffin, while Frank and the other children stood nearby.

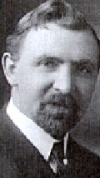
Rudolf Jaromír Pšenka, Czech author and playwright, editor of the Chicago Daily Svornost (Concord) from 1909 until his death in 1939.

As the Paroubeks were not Catholics but freethinkers, there were no prayers, and the service was read by Rudolf Jaromír Pšenka, editor of the Bohemian Chicago Daily Svornost. He spoke of the need to cooperate with police to find Elsie's killers. As the undertaker went to lift the coffin into the hearse, Karolina begged him to open it so she could see Elsie's face once more, but her relatives persuaded her not to insist on this and led her away. Most of the attendees followed Elsie's casket to Bohemian National Cemetery, where Pšenka gave another address.

Frank Paroubek was quoted as saying, "My little girl is at rest and nothing matters to her now, but I shall never rest until I see her murderers paying the penalty for taking her life."

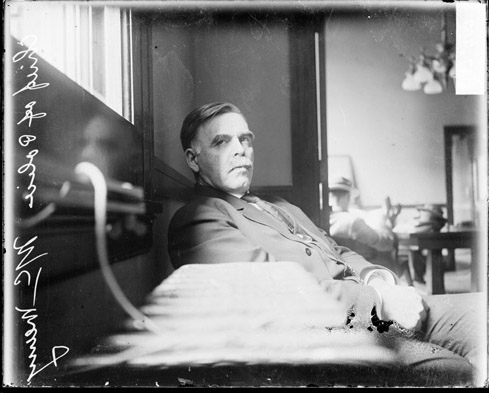
Chicago Chief of Police John McWeeny, taken by a Chicago Daily News photographer in 1911 and possibly published in the newspaper. Chicago Daily News negatives collection, DN-0057767. Courtesy of Chicago History Museum.

Police Chief John McWeeny vowed to devote the entire Chicago police force to finding the killer. Alderman Cermak asked Governor Deneen to increase the reward by $200, "as is possible under the statutes." Cermak said, "I will also ask the governor to issue a proclamation calling upon all the people of the state to interest themselves in this case in order that her murderer be apprehended." Coroner Peter Hoffman started a public reward fund, contributing $25.

Considering where Elsie was found, detectives suspected the actual killer might be Joseph Konesti. According to the Rockford Republic, Konesti was definitely identified as the killer by detectives under the command of Police Capt. Wood. Described as a "bearded Bohemian" and a "hermit peddler", he was said to have "frequently enticed little girls to his hut by the drainage canal," on West 33rd St. and South Kedzie Ave., about a mile and a half from Elsie's home, and had "frequently been seen near the Paroubek home." (Note: Children routinely visited peddlers to make purchases either for themselves or their parents. See Street Peddling, entry in The Encyclopedia of Chicago History, for some background on peddlers -- the ancestors of today's vendors -- and their connections to immigrant neighborhoods such as the Paroubeks'.) Searching the shack, detectives found a green hair ribbon which they intended to take to Karolina for identification, along with "indications of a small hole dug in the ground" and "an old hemp sack, which might have contained the body." The owner of the shack, Mrs. David Shaughnessy advised police that she had complained to Konesti about his "bringing children around the house," and had evicted him on May 9. Konesti threw himself in front of a train on May 10. Five days later he was cleared of any wrongdoing.

On May 13, the body of a well-dressed man was found in the canal at Willow Springs, some 20 miles from Lockport and 14 miles from Albany Avenue. He had no identification, only a Catholic holy card with a prayer in Polish, with the words "Sig. Hoff" written on it. Detectives believed this man also may have had some connection with Elsie's death. An anonymous letter was said to have been received by the detectives. The writer described having seen a little girl walking along the canal with a young man the day Elsie disappeared. On the same day, another loner living in a shack by the canal was identified as a possible person of interest. Mr. Kinsella, described as a "religious enthusiast," was "supposed to be demented." When he saw Detectives Gormley, Slad, and Froenicke approaching his home, he took off running, "making a move as if to draw a revolver." Calling out that they only wanted to question him, the officers fired their weapons into the air. After a three-mile chase through gullies and underbrush, Kinsella escaped into the forest.

On May 15, Frank Paroubek told police he had spoken to a man he did not know who told him he had seen Elsie late in the afternoon of April 8 on Kedzie Avenue, south of 28th St., long after she was supposed to have been taken by Romani people. Lt. Costello assigned detectives to find the man. The previous reported sighting of Elsie had her walking toward the canal on South Troy St., a half block south of her aunt's house. If the unknown man told the truth, Elsie was only three blocks away from a bridge. Despite the coroner's findings, Lt. Costello had become convinced that Elsie's death was an accident and that she had simply fallen into the canal, although Inspector Healey had had the canals and drainage ditches dragged repeatedly during the search. Coroner Hoffman continued to insist Elsie was murdered. Apparently some confusion had occurred during the initial examinations. The first physician (probably Dr. Kingston) to examine Elsie on the night of May 9 told Lt. Costello that she had drowned, with no marks of abuse, and Costello had repeated this when he spoke to the family. However, the following day, the same physician's autopsy findings concluded Elsie had not drowned and that she appeared to have been suffocated.

Detectives surrounded a house near Madison and Robey streets, and threw a dragnet over the southwestern side of town for a former boarder in the Paroubek home. They continued to search for the anonymous writer of the nasty letters received by Frank Paroubek. Apparently neither the boarder, the writer, or the unknown man who had spoken to Frank were ever found.

Two years later, on the anniversary of Elsie's funeral, Frank Paroubek died. He was forty-five years old. Karolina lived until December 9, 1927. Both are buried with Elsie in Bohemian National Cemetery.

== Legacy ==
Although Elsie's mysterious disappearance and death were once the subject of intense police investigation and journalistic focus, her story faded into obscurity until the death of Henry Darger in 1973. Michael Bonesteel, an art historian examining Darger's work, found repeated reference in Darger's In the Realms of the Unreal novel to Annie Aronburg, leader of a child slave rebellion, and to an inspirational picture of her that had been lost. Miss Aronburg had met a shocking yet heroic death at the hands of her captors. (The murder is described in detail, and is nothing like Elsie's death.) According to his diary, Darger really had lost a picture of a little girl and was desperate to get it back or replace it. He did not give the name but said it had appeared in the "Chicago Daily Noise [sic], May, June, or July, 1911." Bonesteel's search in the newspaper archives revealed Elsie Paroubek and her story. A portrait of Annie Aronburg by Darger shows a somewhat older blond-haired girl. Her hair ribbon and the distinctive collar of her dress are similar to Elsie's in the photograph. In the novel, Darger describes children who are kidnapped and mistreated by adults, while the heroic little Vivians, Annie Aronburg and others form "rescue squads" to save them.

== See also ==
- List of kidnappings
- List of solved missing person cases: pre–1950
- List of unsolved murders (1900–1979)
