= Union League Club of Chicago =

Patriotic society to support the policies of Abraham Lincoln

- Logo of the Union League Club of Chicago
- Formation: December 19, 1879; 146 years ago
- Type: |Private social club]
- Tax ID no.: 36-1893300
- Headquarters: 65 West Jackson Boulevard
- Location: Chicago, Illinois, United States
- Coordinates: 41°52′40.75″N 87°37′48.13″W
- President: Robert Ryan
- 1st Vice President: Frank DeVincentis
- 2nd Vice President: Robert Kreisman
- Affiliations: Union League, International Associate Clubs
- Website: ulcc.org

The Union League Club of Chicago is a prominent civic and social club in Chicago that was founded in 1879. Its second and current clubhouse is located at 65 W Jackson Boulevard on the corner of Federal Street, in the Loop neighborhood of Chicago. The club is considered one of the most prestigious in Chicago, ranking fourth in the United States and first in the Midwest on the Five Star Platinum Club list.

Union League clubs, which are legally separate but share similar histories and maintain reciprocal links with one another, are also located in New York City and Philadelphia. Additional Union League clubs were formerly located in Brooklyn, New York and New Haven.

The Union League Club of Chicago Architectural Preservation Foundation is a 501(c)(3) Public Charity. The Union League Club of Chicago operates with 501(c)(7) Social and Recreation Clubs status. In 2024 it had $23,834,915 in total revenue and total assets of $24,482,158. The Luminarts Cultural Foundation the Union League Club of Chicago at the same address is a 501(c)(3) Public Charity. In 2025 it claimed total revenue of $568,667 and total assets of $2,856,288.

== History ==
Founded in 1879, the Union League Club of Chicago traces its roots to the earlier Union League of America.

The Union League of America was founded during the American Civil War to support Abraham Lincoln and preserve the Union. Its first council was founded on June 25, 1862, in Pekin, Illinois and spread rapidly across the North with the first Chicago council formed on August 19, 1862.

After the last Chicago council of the Union League of America disbanded in 1877, Orrin H. Salisbury, a local politician and former member, conceived an idea of a new club in the same tradition that would influence local, state and national politics. He approached John Wentworth ("Long John") who saw in the idea a "marching club" to specifically support Ulysses S. Grant's bid for a third term as President. Even after Grant lost his bid for a third term, Wentworth recruited heavily for the Club.

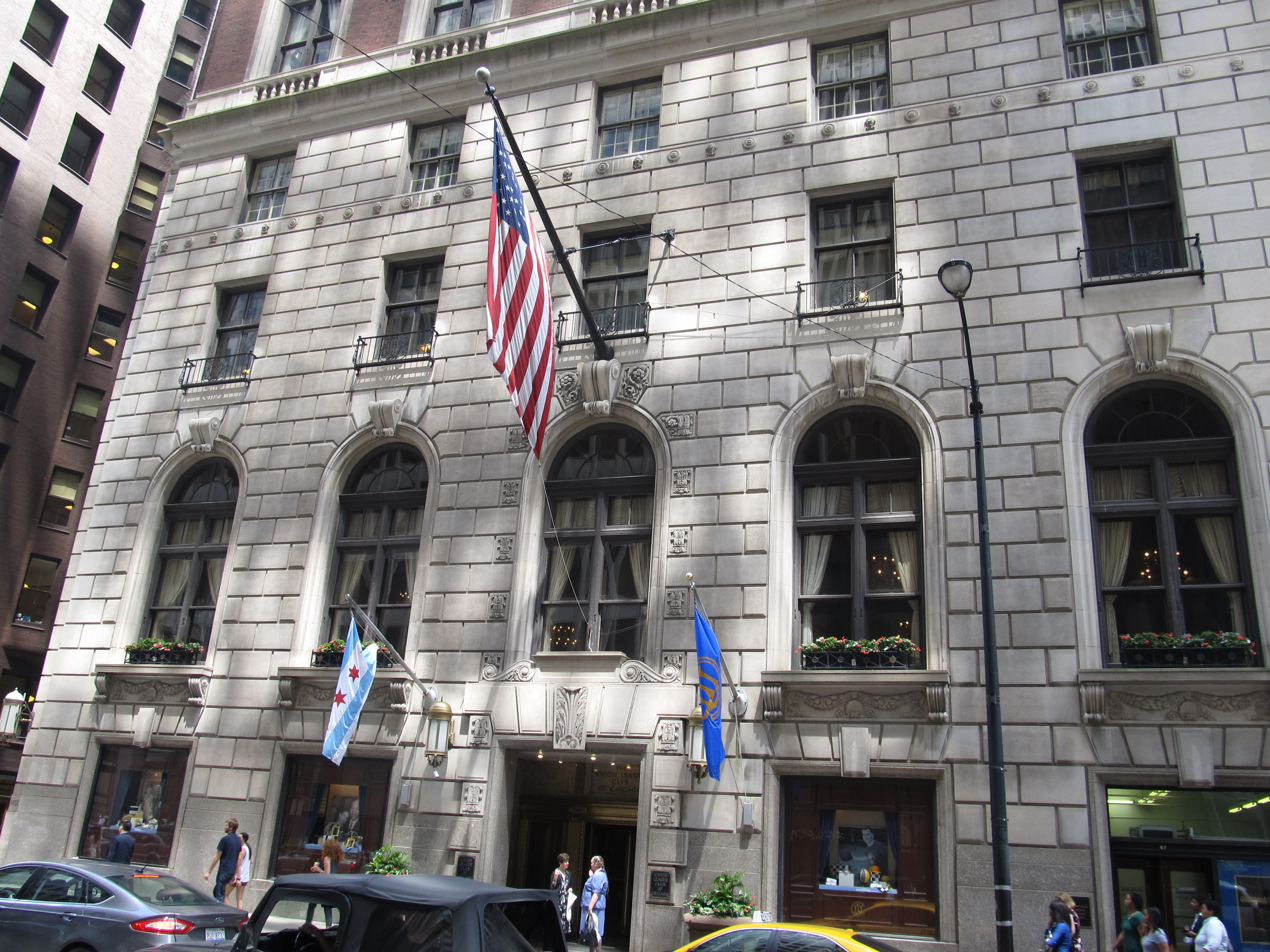
Front of Union League Club of Chicago (Jackson Boulevard)

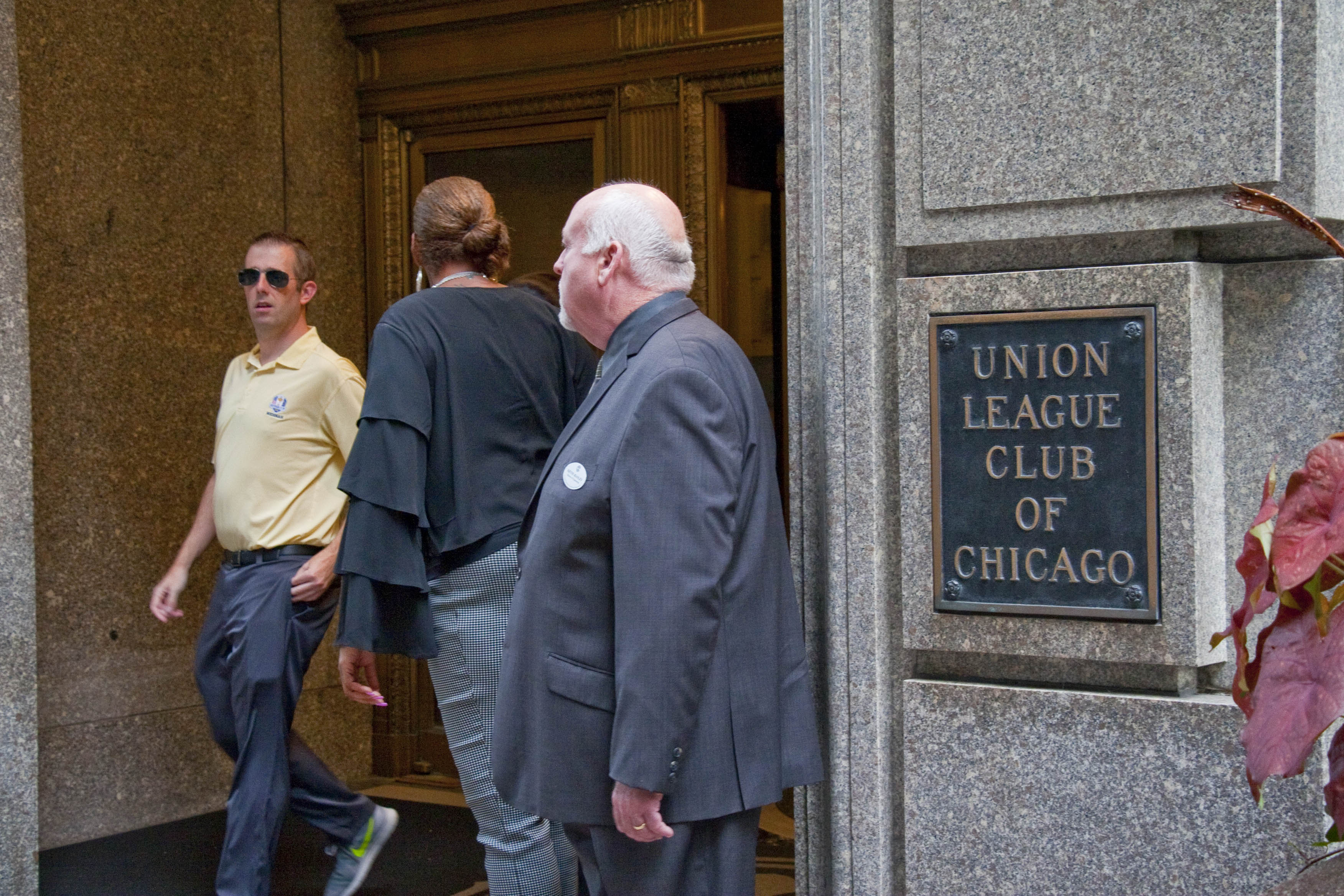
Union League Club of Chicago plaque

The Club was incorporated as the Chicago Club of the Union League of America on December 19, 1879. It was later renamed The Union League Club of Chicago. The first directors included, among others, James B. Bradwell, John Wentworth, William Penn Nixon, and John H. Kedzie. The Club had two sets of officers its first year: James B Bradwell and Lewis Larned Coburn, both elected as President of the Club.

Lobby of the Chicago Union League, Chicago, Illinois

In the Articles of Association, the Club's primary objectives are to (paraphrased): encourage loyalty to the Federal Government, defend the Union, inculcate good citizenship, maintain equality of all citizens, assure the purity of the ballot, oppose corruption, and secure honesty in the administration of National, State, and Municipal affairs. At the same time, some members, led by R. S. Critchell, wanted the Club to have the amenities of a social club including fine dining. Today, according to the Club's website, it is both "a catalyst for action in nonpartisan political, economic and social arenas" and a social club with "an array of unique opportunities for entertainment and personal growth" and fine dining.

The Club's website states: "the Public Affairs Committee and its various subcommittees address a wide range of public policy issues and serve as the conduit for the Club’s involvement in civic affairs". Some of these issues have included:

- Enacting election reform
- Enabling the Chicago Crime Commission
- 1970 Constitutional Convention
- Siting and opening of the Harold Washington Library Center
- Informing the establishment of a moratorium on the death penalty in Illinois

The Club was one of The Top 100 Platinum City Clubs of the World for 2020/2021.

== Building ==
=== Clubhouse ===
The Club's first clubhouse was designed by William Le Baron Jenney. The current clubhouse, built on the same site as the first, was designed by Mundie & Jensen. The building houses meeting rooms, overnight guest rooms, 5 dining areas, a swimming pool and workout facilities.

=== Art Collection ===
The Club’s art collection is extensive prompting the Chicago Tribune to call the Club “The other art institute in Chicago” The same article discusses the depth of the collection in historic and contemporary Chicago artists.

=== The George N Leighton Library ===
According to the Club's website, the Library and Archives are one of the oldest amenities of the Club. The Library was renamed in 2019 to honor long-time member and jurist, George N. Leighton. The Club is a Partner Organization with the Chicago Collections in order to share its archives more broadly.

== Notable members ==
- Dankmar Adler. architect, designed Auditorium Theater
- Robert W. Bergstrom. led 1970 Illinois Constitutional Convention
- James B. Bradwell. Illinois lawyer, judge, politician, represented Mary Todd Lincoln
- Daniel Burnham. architect, Director of Works, World’s Columbian Exposition
- Charles G. Dawes. 30th Vice President of the United States
- Marshall Field. founder of Marshall Field and Company
- Charles L. Hutchinson. business leader, 1st president of the Art Institute of Chicago
- William Le Baron Jenney. architect, designed Home Insurance Building
- John H. Kedzie. lawyer, real estate developer, member Illinois House of Representatives
- George N. Leighton. United States District Judge
- William Penn Nixon. President of Chicago Inter Ocean
- Julius Rosenwald. leader and part-owner of Sears, Roebuck and Company
- Louis Sullivan. architect, including Auditorium Theater and Carson Pirie Scott Store
- John Wentworth ("Long John"). Mayor of Chicago, member of US House of Representatives, editor of the Chicago Democrat
- William J. Bauer. United States Seventh Circuit Court Judge
- Julian L. Yale, Chicago railroad entrepreneur of the Yale family

== Foundations and military support ==
=== Foundations ===
The Club sponsors and houses the administrative staff of 3 non-profit foundations, according to the Foundations' websites,

- Union League Boys & Girls Clubs provides after school programs at 21 locations in Chicago and a summer camp in Wisconsin. Club One was founded in Chicago’s Pilsen neighborhood as the Union League Boys Club in 1919.
- Luminarts Cultural Foundation was founded in 1949 as the Union League Civic & Arts Foundation. It supports young Chicago artists, writers, and musicians through the annual selection of Luminarts Fellows.
- The Chicago Engineers’ Foundation evolved from the Chicago Engineers’ Club, an organization established in 1903 as a professional and networking group for Chicago engineers.

=== Military support ===
According to the Club's website, it supports the men and women of the armed services through the following groups:

- The Club’s American Legion Post #758 was established in 1934.
- The Chicago 502, organized by the Club in 2001, supports the soldiers and families of the 502nd Infantry Regiment of the 101st Airborne Division.
- The 721 Club supported the commissioning and now supports the crew and families of the USS Chicago (SSN-721) submarine.
- The 786 Club supported the commissioning and now supports the crew and families of the USS Illinois (SSN-786) submarine.
- The Club sponsored the Commissioning Committee for the USS Hyman G. Rickover (SSN-795) submarine.

== See also ==
- Union League
- Union League of Philadelphia
- Union League Club of New York
- Union League Golf and Country Club
- List of gentlemen's clubs in the United States
