= California station (CTA Green Line) =

Chicago "L" station

California 2800W 120N
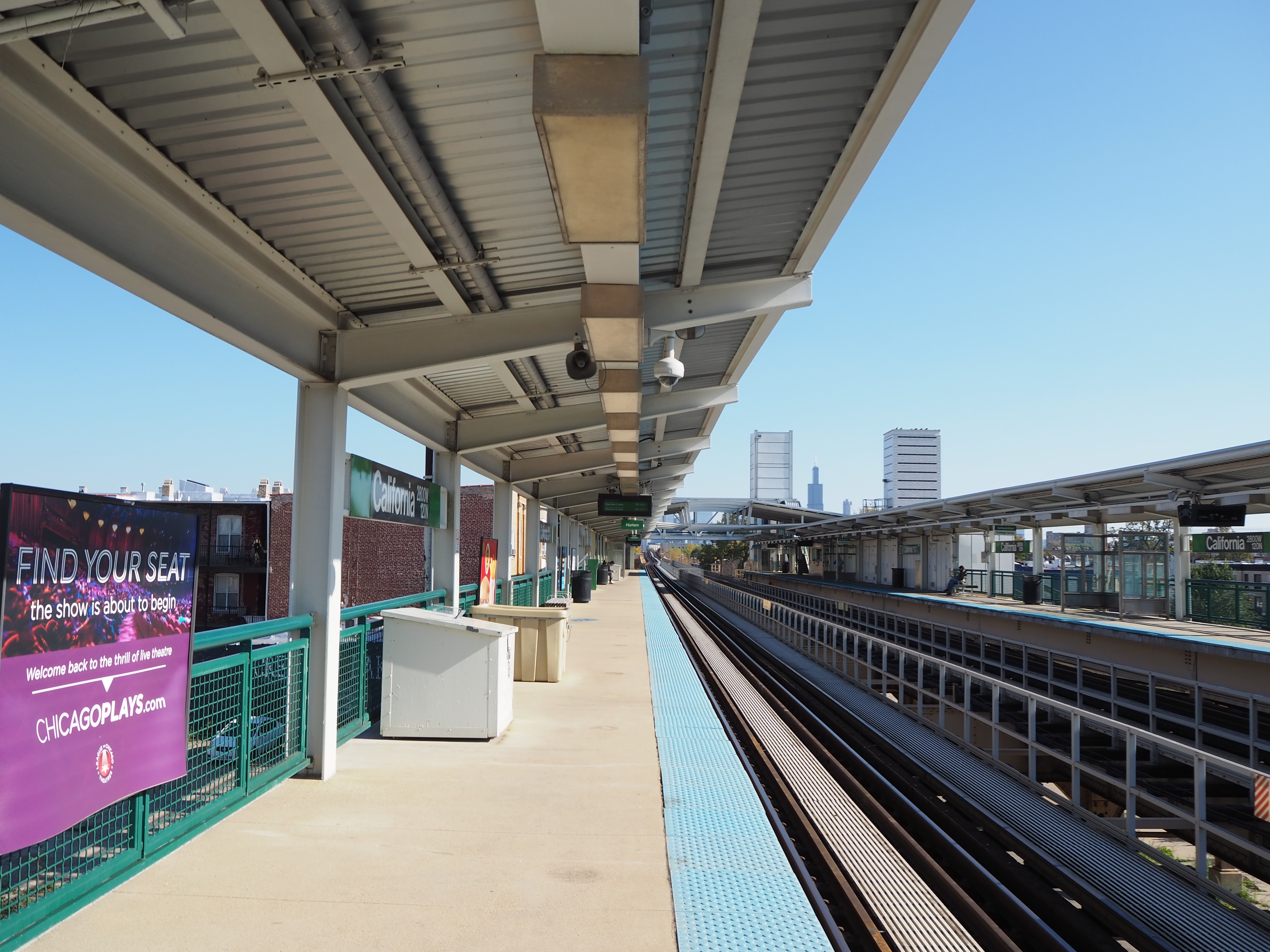

General information
- Location: 2800 West Lake Street; Chicago, Illinois 60612
- Coordinates: 41.88422°N 87.696234°W
- Owner: Chicago Transit Authority
- Line: Lake Branch
- Platforms: 2 side platforms
- Tracks: 2 tracks

Construction
- Structure type: Elevated
- Cycle facilities: Yes
- Accessible: Yes

History
- Opened: November 6, 1893
- Closed: February 9, 1992 – July 13, 1996
- Rebuilt: 1977–80 (fare controls), 1996

Passengers
- 2025: 239,951 ▲4.8%

Services
Preceding station	Chicago "L"	Following station
Kedzie toward Harlem/Lake	Green Line	Damen toward Ashland/63rd or Cottage Grove
Former services
Preceding station	Chicago "L"	Following station
Sacramento Closed 1948 toward Forest Park	Lake Street Elevated	Campbell Closed 1948 toward Loop (Randolph/Wells) or Market Terminal
Track layout
Location

California is a station on the Chicago Transit Authority's 'L' system, serving the Green Line's Lake Branch. It opened on November 6, 1893. California closed on February 9, 1992, as part of a series of budget cuts, but later reopened with the completion of the Green Line rehabilitation.

The station is situated at the intersection of California Avenue and Lake Street in the East Garfield Park neighborhood. It is wheel-chair accessible. It is also close to the Chicago Center for Green Technology.

== Bus connections ==
CTA

- 94 California
