= Kedzie Avenue =

Street in Chicago, Illinois

Kedzie Avenue (Kedzie Boulevard)
- John H. Kedzie Memorial Avenue; 3200 West (32nd Avenue)
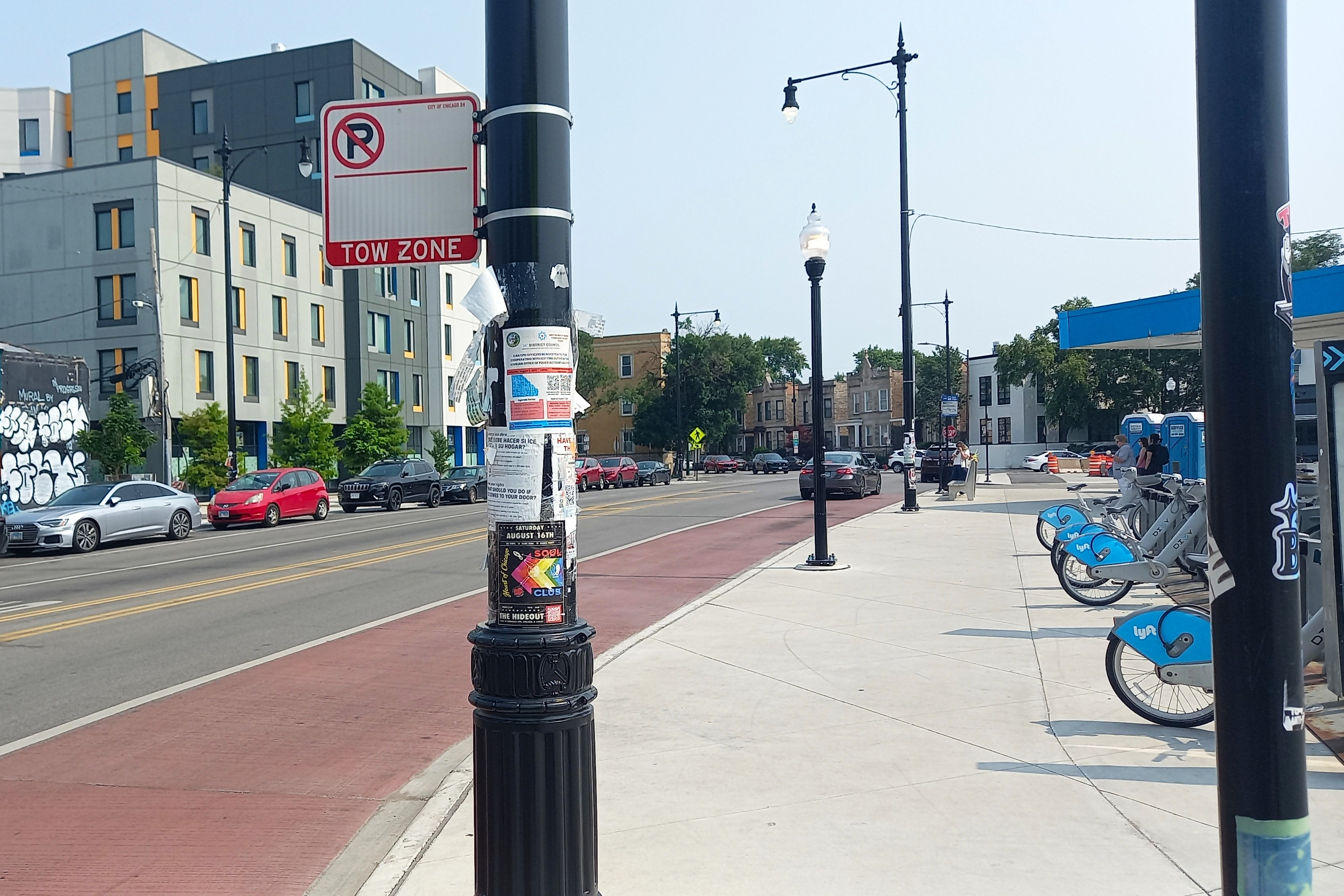
- Kedzie Avenue at Milwaukee Avenue, Logan Square station is shown on the right, 2025
- South end: 206th Street (20600 S) in Olympia Fields
- North end: Howard Street (7600 N) at the Chicago/Evanston/Skokie border

Kedzie Avenue is a major north–south street in Chicago, Illinois.

Both Kedzie streets in Chicago and suburban Evanston are named after John H. Kedzie, an early Chicago real-estate developer. Kedzie Avenue extends more than 20 miles (32 km) from the southern suburb of Olympia Fields to Bryn Mawr Avenue (5600 North), and again from Lincoln Avenue (6100 North) to the tripoint of Chicago, Evanston, and Skokie's borders at Howard Street (7600 North). In Chicago's street grid, Kedzie Avenue is located at 3200 West, 4 miles (6.4 km) west of State Street (0 East/West).

Between Palmer Street (2200 North) and Logan Boulevard (2600 North), Kedzie Avenue is part of Chicago's boulevard system and, as such, is signed as Kedzie Boulevard.

On its path through the city, Kedzie passes through the neighborhoods of (from south to north) Mount Greenwood, Ashburn, Chicago Lawn, Gage Park, Brighton Park, Little Village, Lawndale, East Garfield Park, Humboldt Park, Logan Square, Avondale, Irving Park, Albany Park, North Park and West Ridge, in addition to the suburbs of Olympia Fields, Flossmoor, Homewood, Hazel Crest, Markham, Posen, Midlothian, Robbins, Blue Island, Alsip, Merrionette Park, Evergreen Park, Evanston, and Skokie.

== Transportation ==
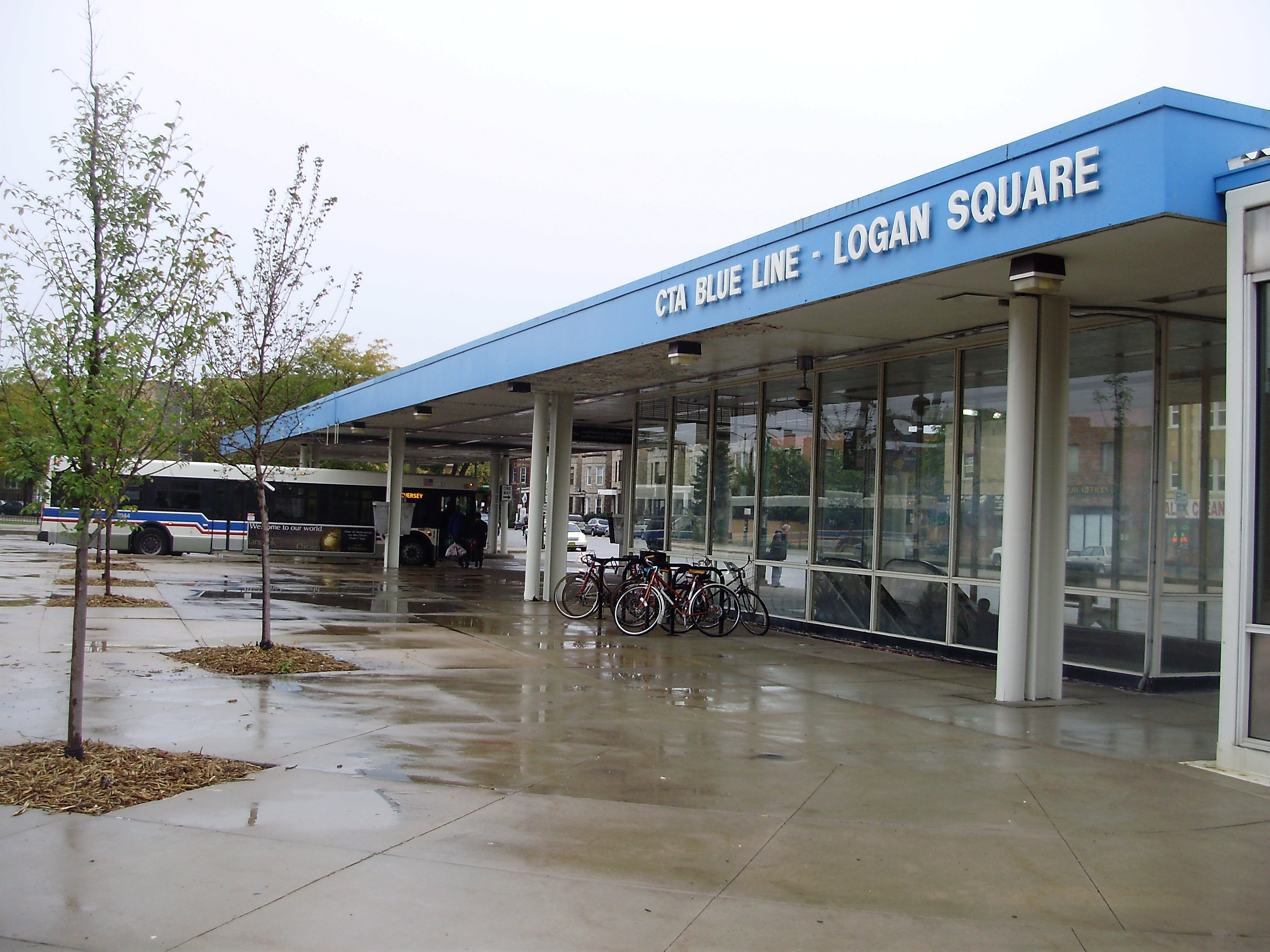
The Logan Square station at Kedzie, Milwaukee, and Logan.

Kedzie Avenue is served by many transit routes and stations.

Several Chicago "L" lines serve Kedzie Avenue: the Brown Line (at Kedzie and Eastwood Avenue), the Blue Line (at Logan Square and Kedzie–Homan), the Green Line (at Kedzie and Lake Street), the Pink Line (at Kedzie and 21st Street), and the Orange Line (at Kedzie and 48th Place). In addition, a few Metra lines serve Kedzie Avenue: the Union Pacific West Line (at Kedzie), the SouthWest Service (at Wrightwood), the Rock Island District (at Robbins), and the Metra Electric District (at Olympia Fields).

There are two CTA bus routes primarily serving Kedzie Avenue: 52 Kedzie and 52A South Kedzie. Bus route 52 runs from Chicago Avenue to 63rd Place; route 52A runs from Kedzie Orange Line station to 115th Street/Springfield Avenue. Bus route 11 runs along Kedzie Avenue from Devon Avenue to Howard Street in the West Ridge neighborhood. In the south suburbs, the southern half of Pace bus route 359 runs along Kedzie Avenue from 139th Street to 183rd Street.

== See also ==
- Nabisco, the world's largest bakery on 7300 South Kedzie Avenue
