= Bohemian National Cemetery (Chicago) =

- U.S. National Register of Historic Places
- U.S. Historic district
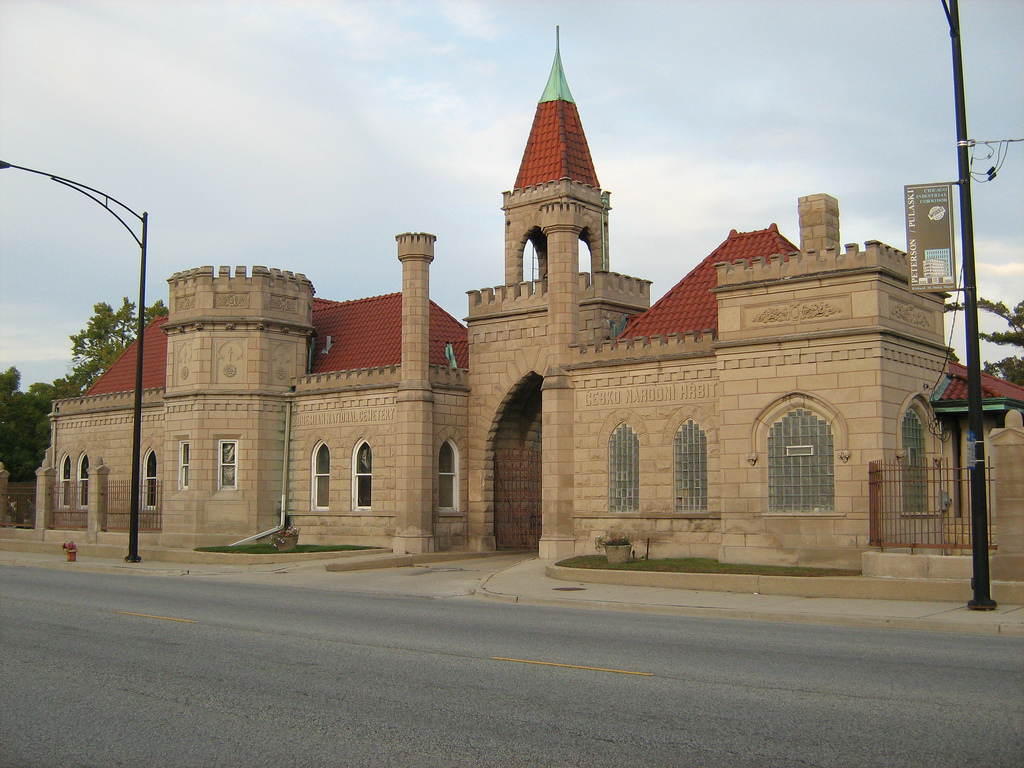
- Entrance to Bohemian National Cemetery

- Location within Chicago metropolitan area Location within Illinois Location within the United States
- Location: Chicago, Illinois, US
- Coordinates: 41°58′45″N 87°43′30″W
- Built: 1877; 149 years ago
- NRHP reference No.: 06000374
- Added to NRHP: 2006

Bohemian National Cemetery (Czech: Český národní hřbitov [t͡ʃɛskiː naːrodɲiː ɦr̝bɪtof]) is a cemetery at 5255 North Pulaski Road in North Park, Chicago, Illinois, United States.

== History ==
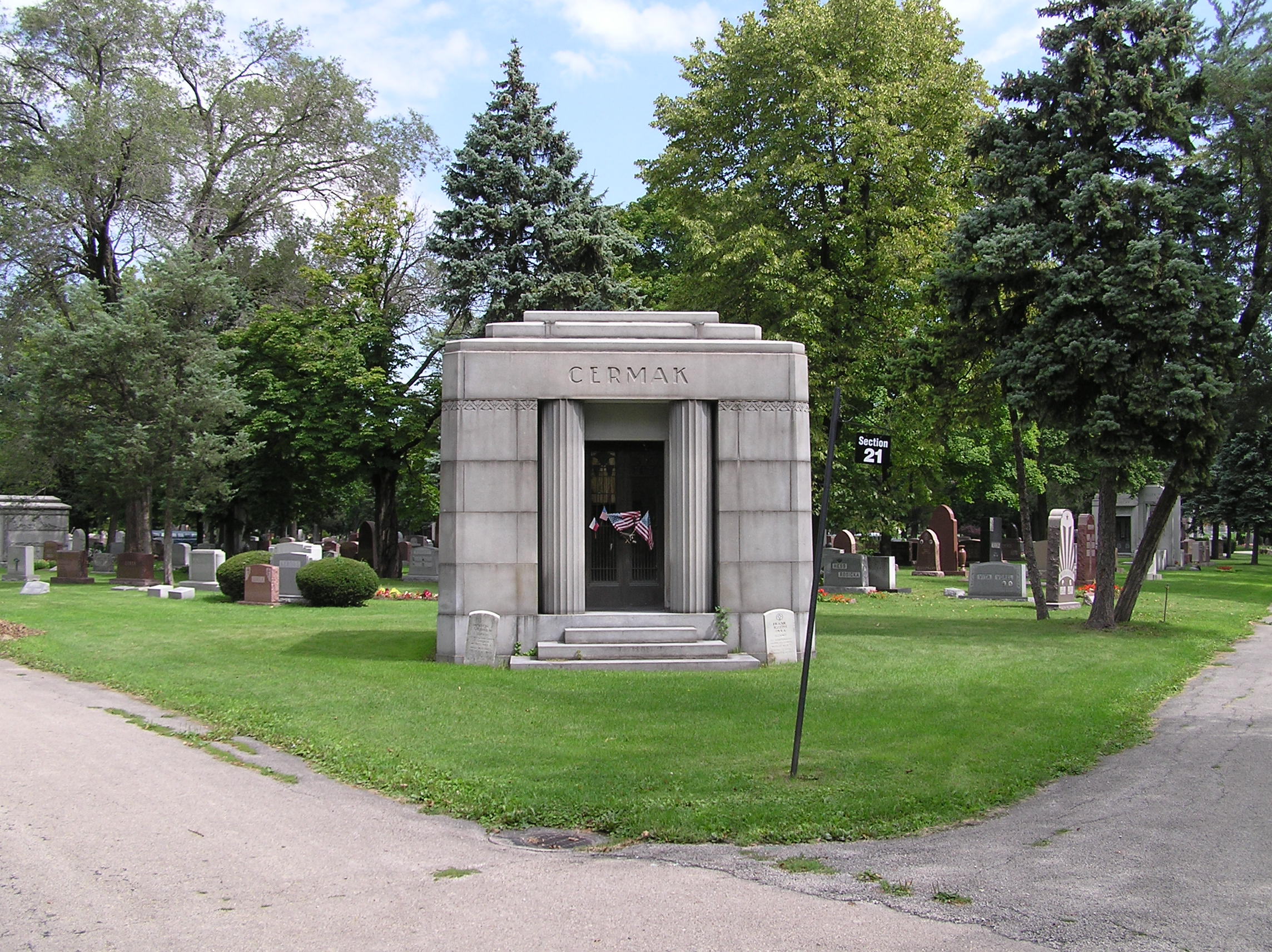
Tomb of Anton Cermak in Section 21

The cemetery was established by members of Chicago's Czech community in 1877. The community had been outraged when a Czech Catholic woman named Marie Silhanek was denied burial at several Catholic cemeteries in Chicago because she supposedly never made her Easter Duty (going to confession and Holy Communion at least once during the Easter season), which is incumbent on all Catholics. In response, the Czechs purchased land in what was then Jefferson Township to create a cemetery that they themselves could control. The original plot of land was 50 acres (200,000 m^{2}). Over the years, the cemetery expanded to 126 acres (0.51 km^{2}).

The cemetery was featured in the 1998 film U.S. Marshals as the fictional Queens Hill Cemetery in Queens, NY. It was added to the National Register of Historic Places in 2006.

== Major features ==
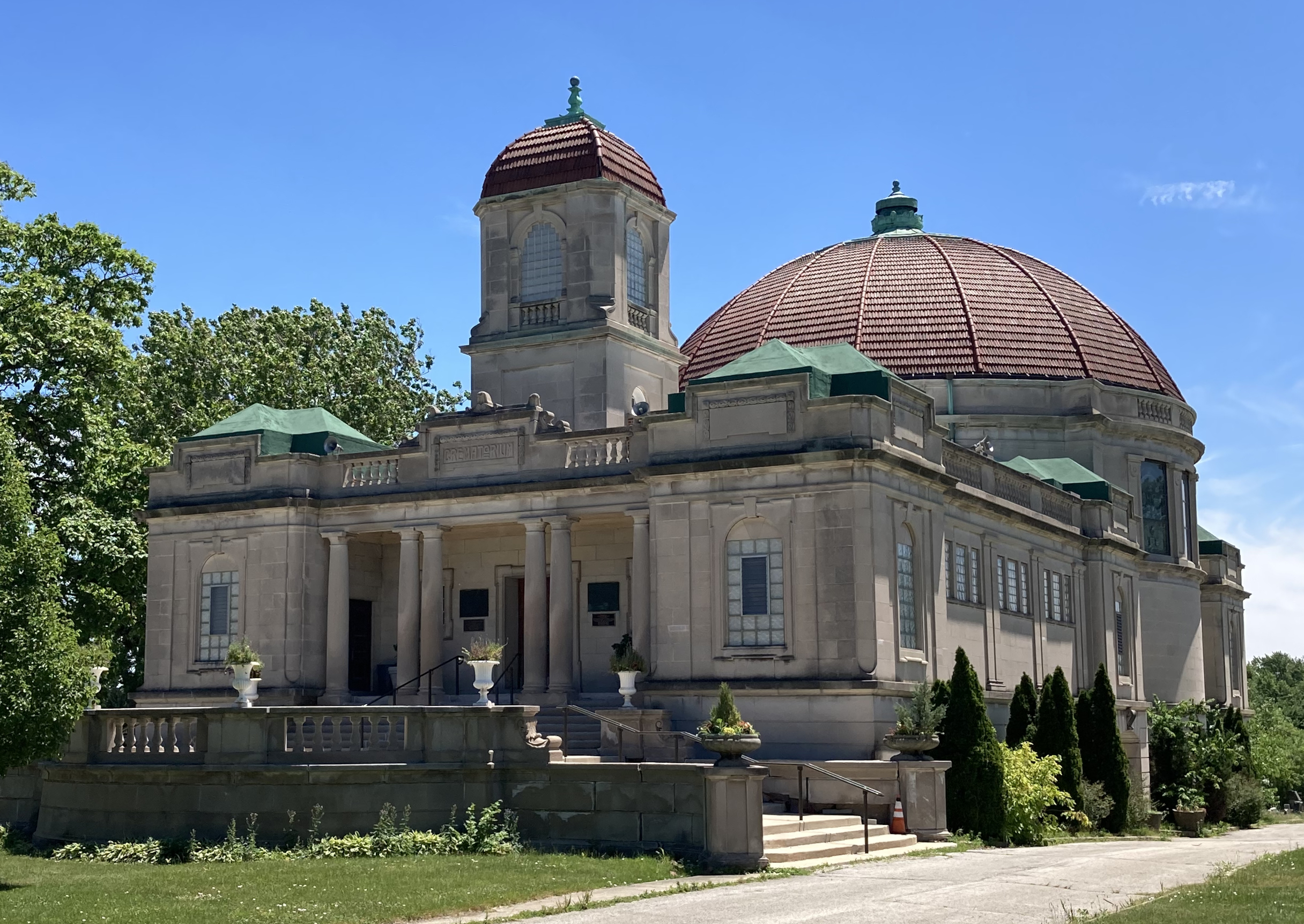
Crematorium building

Bohemian National Cemetery is known for its limestone gatehouse and its highly decorated columbarium niches, which contain photographs, artwork, flags, and other mementos of the individuals whose ashes are stored there. Czech-American military veterans are honored through an American Civil War memorial, a Spanish–American War memorial, and a World Wars memorial, which were dedicated in 1889, 1926, and 1952, respectively. The cemetery also boasts two sculptures by Albin Polasek, who headed the sculpture department at the Art Institute of Chicago. They are called Mother and Pilgrim.

== Notable interments ==
- Victims of the Iroquois Theatre fire (1903).
- Victims of the SS Eastland shipwreck (1915).
- Anton Cermak, Chicago mayor assassinated in 1933.
- Otto Kerner, Sr., (1952) judge and former Illinois Attorney General.
- Elsie Paroubek, (1911) a five-year-old kidnapping and murder victim whose story and photo in the Chicago Daily News inspired Henry Darger's novel The Story of the Vivian Girls.
- Charles J. Vopicka, (1935) U.S. ambassador to several eastern European countries.
- Wanda Stopa, (1924) Chicago's youngest and first woman assistant U.S. district attorney.

== Chicago Cubs columbarium ==
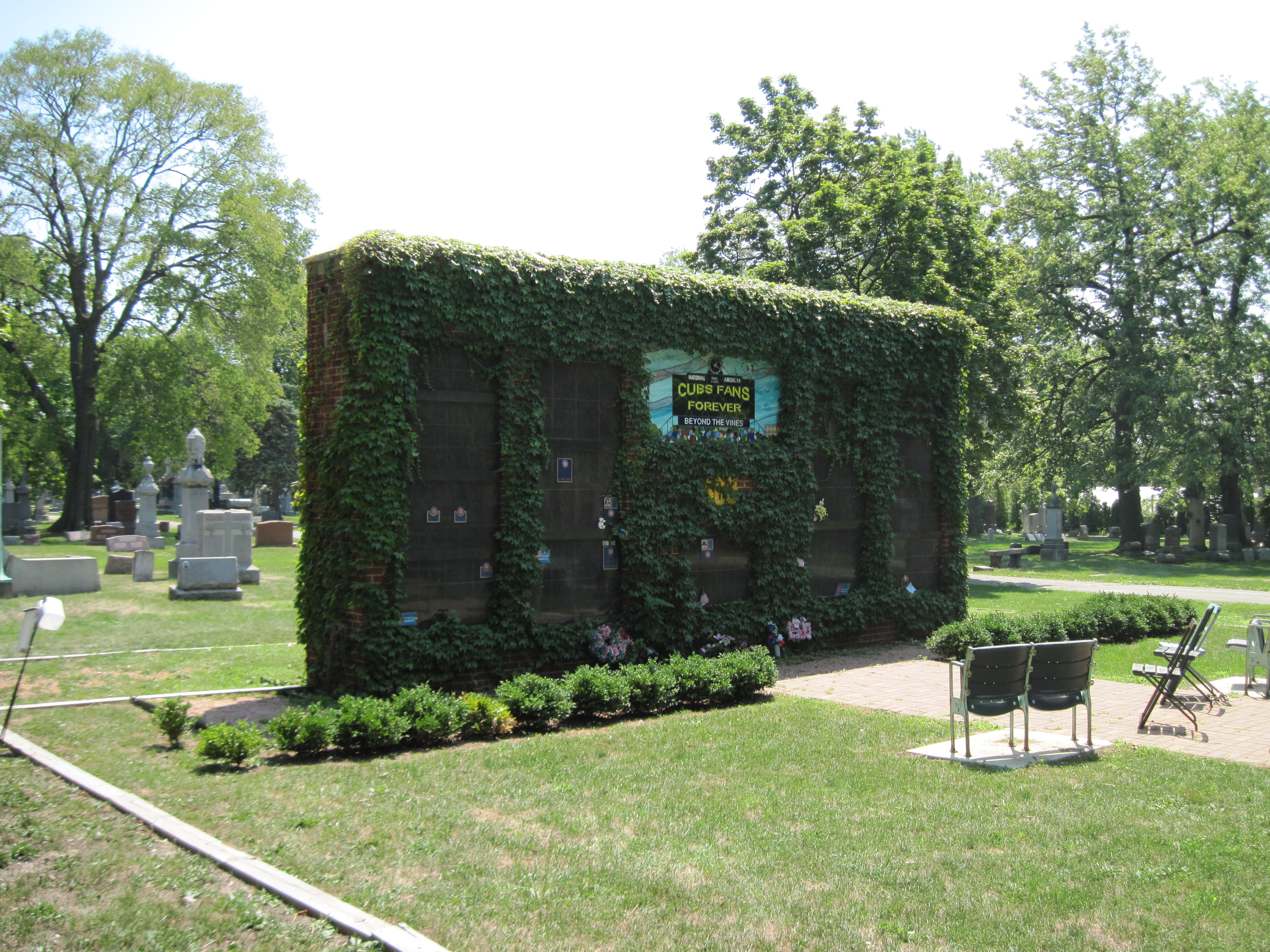
Chicago Cubs columbarium

In 2009, the cemetery added a columbarium specially dedicated to Chicago Cubs fans. The structure is a replica of Wrigley Field's red brick wall, with a stained glass image of the stadium's scoreboard and a yellow 400 foot (120 m) marker. The wall contains 288 niches, and seats from Wrigley Field have been placed along its base. A Cubs fan named Dennis Mascari helped raise funds for the project in hopes of making visits to the cemetery less depressing. The cemetery agreed to let him build the columbarium on their grounds, but nixed a plan to broadcast Cubs games through a nearby speaker. The Cubs themselves were not directly involved with the project; Mascari worked with Eternal Images, which makes baseball-themed funerary products.

== See also ==
- Bohemian National Cemetery (Baltimore)
