= William Penn Nixon =

American politician

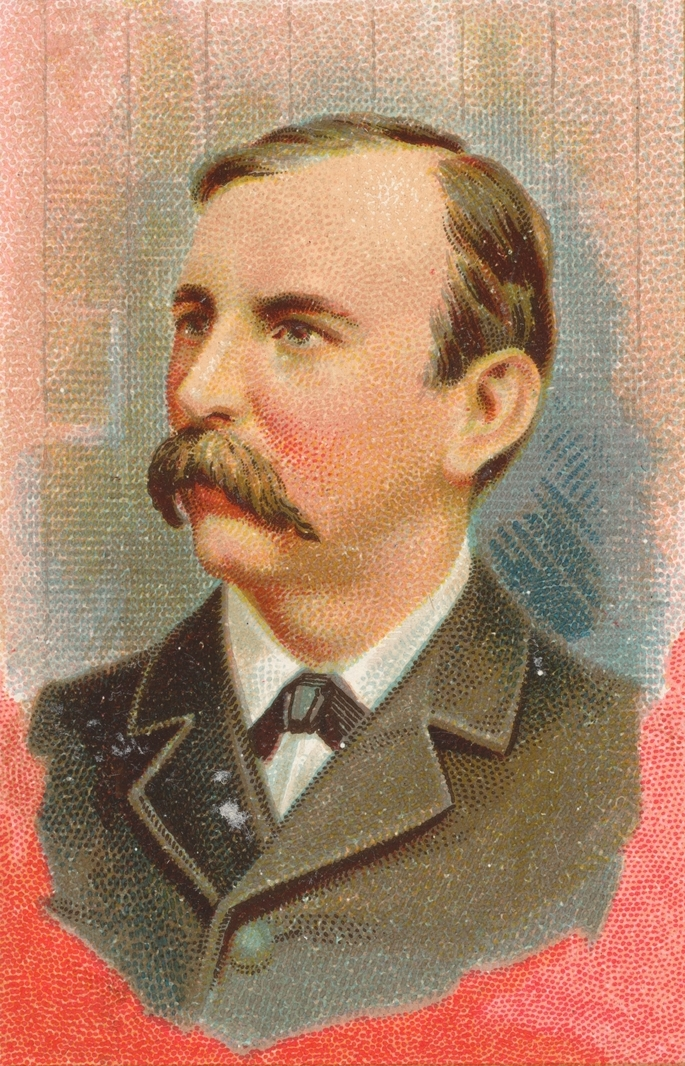

Member of the Ohio House of Representatives from the Hamilton County district
- In office 1864 – 1867
- Preceded by: George Keck

Personal details
- Born: 1832 Newport, Indiana
- Died: February 20, 1912 (aged 79–80) Chicago, Illinois
- Party: Republican
- Profession: Publisher

William Penn Nixon Sr. (1832 – February 20, 1912) was an American publisher and politician from Indiana. Following an extensive private education, Nixon graduated from the University of Pennsylvania and became involved in Ohio politics. He served one partial and one full term in the Ohio House of Representatives, then retired from elected politics. He founded a newspaper in Cincinnati, then sold his share to move to Chicago, Illinois. There, he became manager of the nascent Chicago Inter Ocean. He assumed the presidency of the company in 1876, holding it until his death. Nixon also served as president of the Associated Press and Collector of the Port of Chicago.

== Biography ==
William Penn Nixon was born in 1832 in Newport, Indiana (now Fountain City). He descended from plantation owners and his father Samuel ran a successful business transporting goods across the Blue Ridge Mountains in North Carolina. Nixon attended private schools, then attended Turtle Creek Academy in Warren County, Ohio. After two years, he studied for a year with his brother at Harveysburg Academy. Nixon matriculated at Earlham College in Richmond, Indiana, a Quaker school. He taught for a year after graduating, then attended Farmer's College, near Cincinnati, Ohio, graduating in 1854. He studied at the University of Pennsylvania, graduating in 1859 after four years.

Nixon returned to Cincinnati to open a law practice. A staunch Republican, Nixon quickly became involved in county politics. He helped to reorganize Hamilton County, Ohio, He was elected to the Ohio House of Representatives to fill the vacancy of the deceased George Keck in 1864. The next year, he was elected to a two-year term. He then retired from politics and toured Europe. He was appointed president of the Cincinnati Mutual Life Insurance Company when he returned.

In 1869, Nixon co-founded the Cincinnati Daily Chronicle. He initially served as its editor, but soon became its publisher and business manager instead. While in these positions, Nixon purchased the competing Cincinnati Evening Times and merged the papers. He then sold his interest in the company. Following a merger of Cincinnati Mutual Life with the Union Central Life Insurance Company, Nixon sold his interest in that corporation as well, and moved to Chicago, Illinois.

Arriving in 1872, shortly after the Great Chicago Fire, Nixon became associated with the Chicago Inter Ocean. The paper had just been founded in March, and Nixon was appointed its manager that May. He held this position for four years, until he became general manager and editor-in-chief. He held this positions until his death in 1912. Although his position as leader of a Republican paper made him one of the most prominent party members in the city, Nixon declined to run for elected office. Nixon was president of the Associated Press for several years. He was a delegate to the 1896 Republican National Convention. President William McKinley appointed Nixon Collector of the port of Chicago.

Nixon married Mary F. Stites in September, 1861, but she died the next spring. In June, 1869, Nixon married Elizabeth Duffield. They had three children: Mary Stites, Bertha Duffield, and William Penn. He was a member of the Union League Club of Chicago and was a director of the Chicago Humane Society. Elizabeth Nixon served on the board of trustees of the Illinois Training School for Nurses. They enjoyed collecting books. His son became a traveling salesman for Marshall Field & Co. Nixon died of a heart attack at his Chicago house on February 20, 1912. He was buried in Spring Grove Cemetery in Cincinnati.
