= Wanda Stopa =

American lawyer

Wanda Elaine Stopa
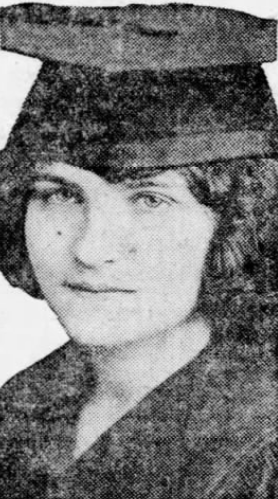
- Born: May 5, 1900; Warsaw, Mazowieckie, Poland, Russian Empire
- Died: April 25, 1924 (aged 23); Detroit, Michigan, US
- Cause of death: Suicide by cyanide poisoning
- Resting place: Bohemian National Cemetery, Chicago, Illinois
- Occupation: District attorney

Wanda Elaine Stopa (May 5, 1900 – April 25, 1924) was a Polish-American lawyer and murderer who committed suicide the day after committing her crime.

== Life ==
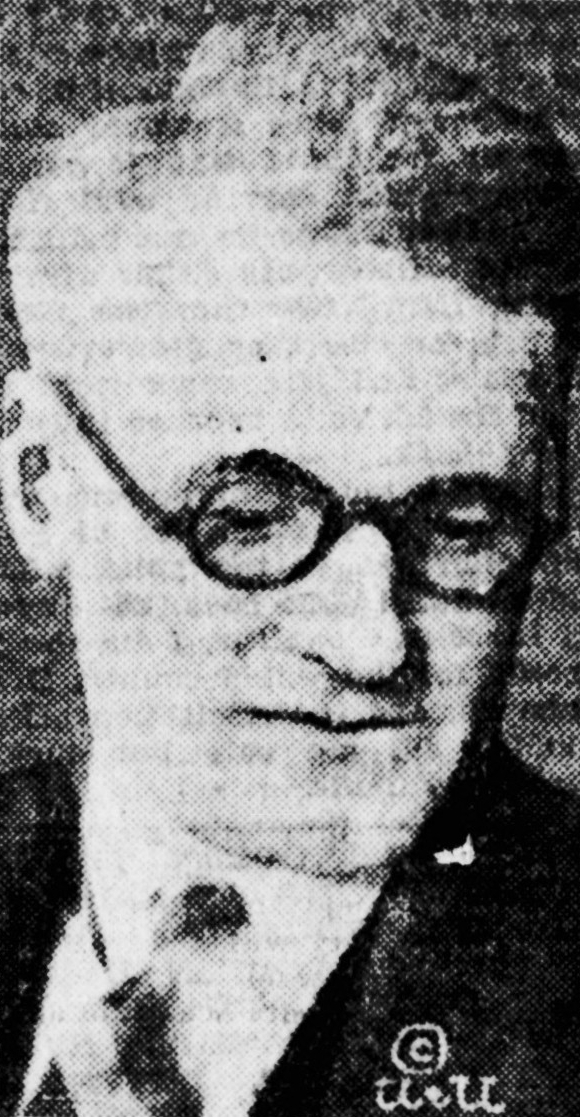
Kenley Smith, Stopa's lover

Stopa was born in Warsaw, Poland, in 1900. She emigrated to the United States with her parents and siblings, ending up in Chicago's Little Poland neighborhood. Her father was a clay sculpture modeler in Chicago and her mother came from a prominent Polish family. While living in her parents' rigidly conformist home, she studied at The John Marshall Law School, passed the bar exam and became Chicago's youngest and first woman assistant U.S. district attorney. Others described her as extremely smart and of a dominating emotional nature.

In search of a more individualistic and independent lifestyle, Stopa moved to a studio with other creatives located in the Bohemian Towertown neighborhood. True to the reputation of the Roaring Twenties, the studio was the site of late night parties and non-traditional lifestyles. Stopa lived at the studio for three years; for one summer, an advertising executive named Y. Kenley Smith and his wife, a pianist, lived there as well.

Also living at the artists' studio was a Russian man whom Stopa married, variously referred to in the press as "Vlad", "Ted", "Glaskoff", "Glasko", "Glasgow" or "Glaskow". There is confusion about his background. He described himself as a count who lost a fortune in the Russian Revolution, but Stopa's brothers portrayed him as a bootlegger and professional gambler. He and Stopa separated soon after marrying.

Smith financially supported Stopa as an intellectual and artist. At some point, they began an affair. When Smith broke off the relationship, Stopa was extremely unhappy and demanded he leave his wife for her. Stopa traveled to the Smiths' Palos Park cottage on the outskirts of the city and tried to shoot her lover's wife, named Doodles, but accidentally shot and killed their 68-year old gardener, Henry Manning. Kenley Smith was at work in downtown Chicago at the time of the shooting and was quickly picked up by the authorities for his protection and for an interview. Stopa fled the scene and led the police on a manhunt.

== Death ==
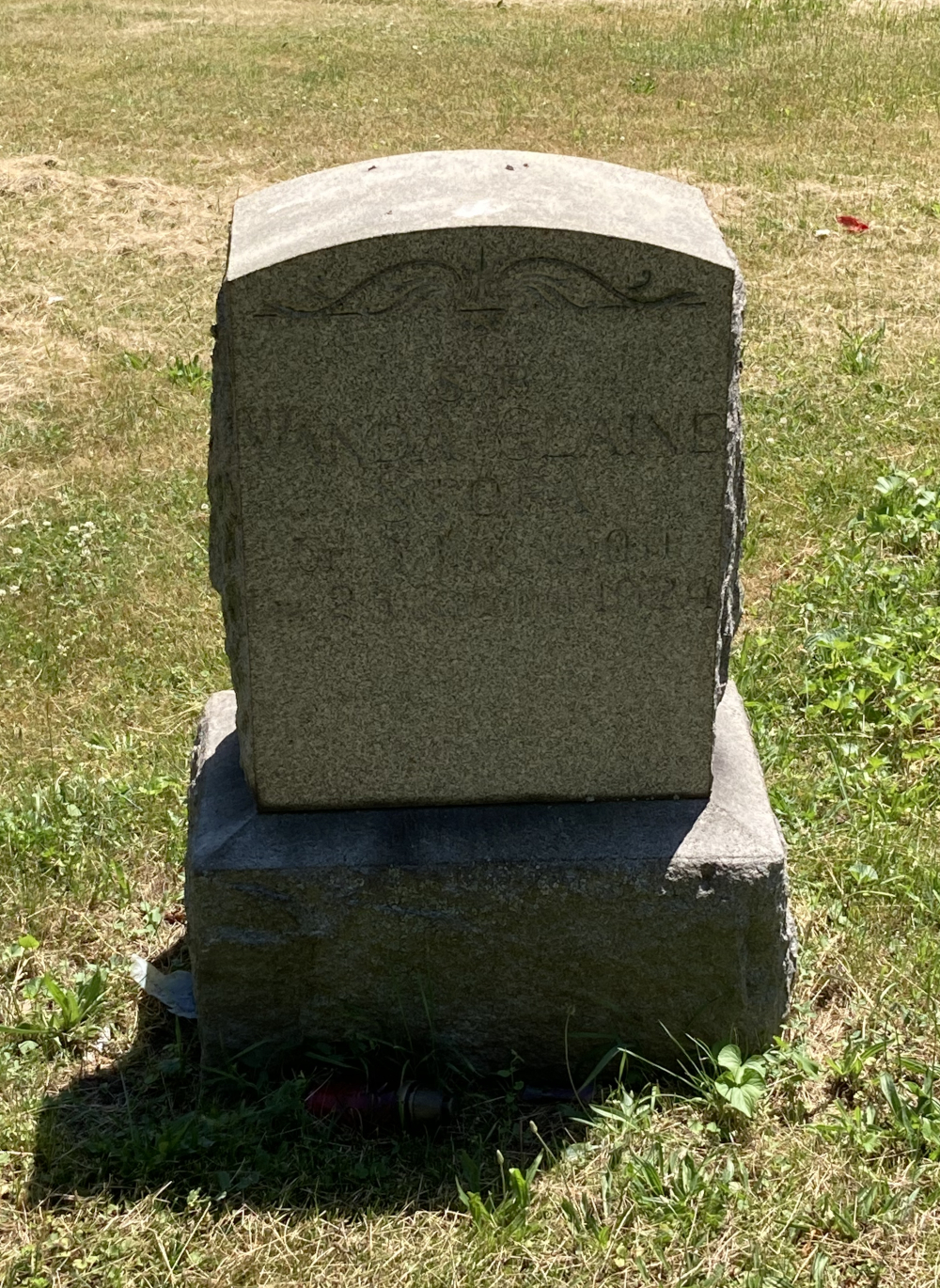
Stopa's grave at Bohemian National Cemetery

Stopa committed suicide by ingesting cyanide in a room in the Detroit Statler Hotel. Her brothers speculated that her estranged Russian husband provided the poison and described his influence on her life as "evil". Crushed by the loss of their friend, the artists from the Bohemian studio asked to be involved with Stopa's funeral. Enticed by the nature of the tragic love story, her funeral drew many curious onlookers and gawkers, some accounts claiming as many as 10,000 people. Stopa is buried at the Bohemian National Cemetery.

== Popular culture ==
Ernest Hemingway was once a tenant and friend of Stopa's lover, Kenley Smith. After reading of the scandal in the newspaper, Hemingway privately reacted to it with dark amusement.

In 2019, Stopa's story was featured in a Season 13 episode of the American television series Deadly Women, with Kelsie Feltrin portraying Stopa.

Stopa's story was also the subject of episode 108 of the Chicago History Podcast.

The award-winning blog 1,001 Chicago Afternoons by Paul Dailing delved into the story in post number 283, named "The Murderess Down the Block".
