= Kedzie station (CTA Green Line) =

Chicago "L" station

Kedzie 3200W 200N
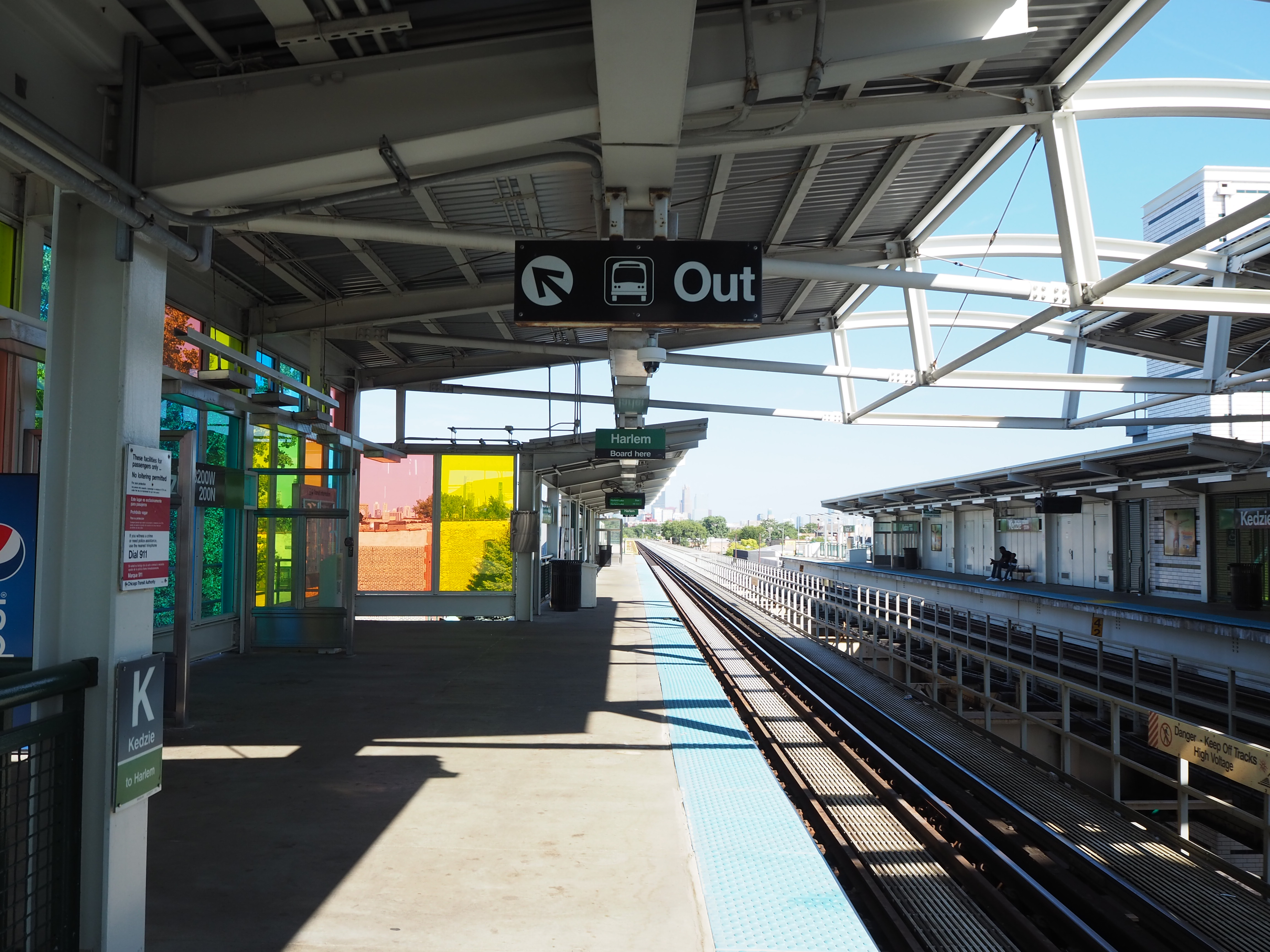

General information
- Location: 3200 West Lake Street; Chicago, Illinois 60624
- Coordinates: 41.884321°N 87.706155°W
- Owner: Chicago Transit Authority
- Line: Lake Branch
- Platforms: 2 side platforms
- Tracks: 2 tracks
- Connections: CTA Buses

Construction
- Structure type: Elevated
- Cycle facilities: Yes
- Accessible: Yes

History
- Opened: March 1894
- Rebuilt: 1996

Passengers
- 2025: 231,988 ▲5.3%

Services
Preceding station	Chicago "L"	Following station
Conservatory–Central Park Drive toward Harlem/Lake	Green Line	California toward Ashland/63rd or Cottage Grove
Former services
Preceding station	Chicago "L"	Following station
Homan Closed 1994 toward Harlem/Lake	Lake Street Elevated	Sacramento Closed 1948 toward Loop (Randolph/Wells) or Market Terminal
Track layout
Location

Kedzie is a station on the Chicago Transit Authority's 'L' system, serving the Green Line and the East Garfield Park neighborhood. It opened in March 1894, and is three blocks south of Metra's Kedzie station on the Union Pacific West Line. It is also near the Chicago Center for Green Technology.

== Station layout ==
The station consists of two side platforms. There is only one entrance to the station, adjacent to the eastbound platform. Access to the westbound platform is provided by a bridge over the platforms. However, each platform does have its own exit-only staircase.

== History ==
The station was opened in March 1894, and is typical of the stations built in 1892-93 by the Lake Street Elevated Railroad, consisting of two rooms with windows on each side of the station. During the first fifty years of its existence, very little changed and the station retained its original Queen Anne style. Given the weakening of the number of passengers, the presence of an employee's desk was more assured as the hours from January 1, 1958. On January 5, 1964, outputs auxiliary were opened to prevent the crossing of the flow of passengers.

In 1974, the Chicago Transit Authority demolished the two rooms of the counters in order to replace them with a single utility room on the side Inbound to reduce the operating cost of Kedzie. This meant passengers to Harlem had to pay for their ticket on the other platform before changing to take their train. On January 9, 1994, The Green Line closed for a two-year renovation project. Like other stations on the line, Kedzie was replaced by a new modern station built on the model devised by architects Skidmore, Owings & Merrill. The Green Line and Kedzie reopened on May 12, 1996, in a temporary form until the station was fully completed and inaugurated on December 16, 1996.

Unlike previous incarnations of the station, a single pricing control area was built for both directions, it is always located at the level of the paths to the centre (Inbound) but an elevator allows traffic between channels. In December 2002, Kedzie was one of the four new project of Chicago Transit Authority monitoring pilot (with Roosevelt and 95/Dan Ryan on the Red Line and 35/Archer on the Orange Line). Kedzie is accessible to people with reduced mobility and 429,710 passengers have used it in 2008.

== Bus and rail connections ==
CTA

- 52 Kedzie

Metra

- Union Pacific West (at Kedzie station 3 blocks north)
