= Míčov-Sušice =

- Municipality
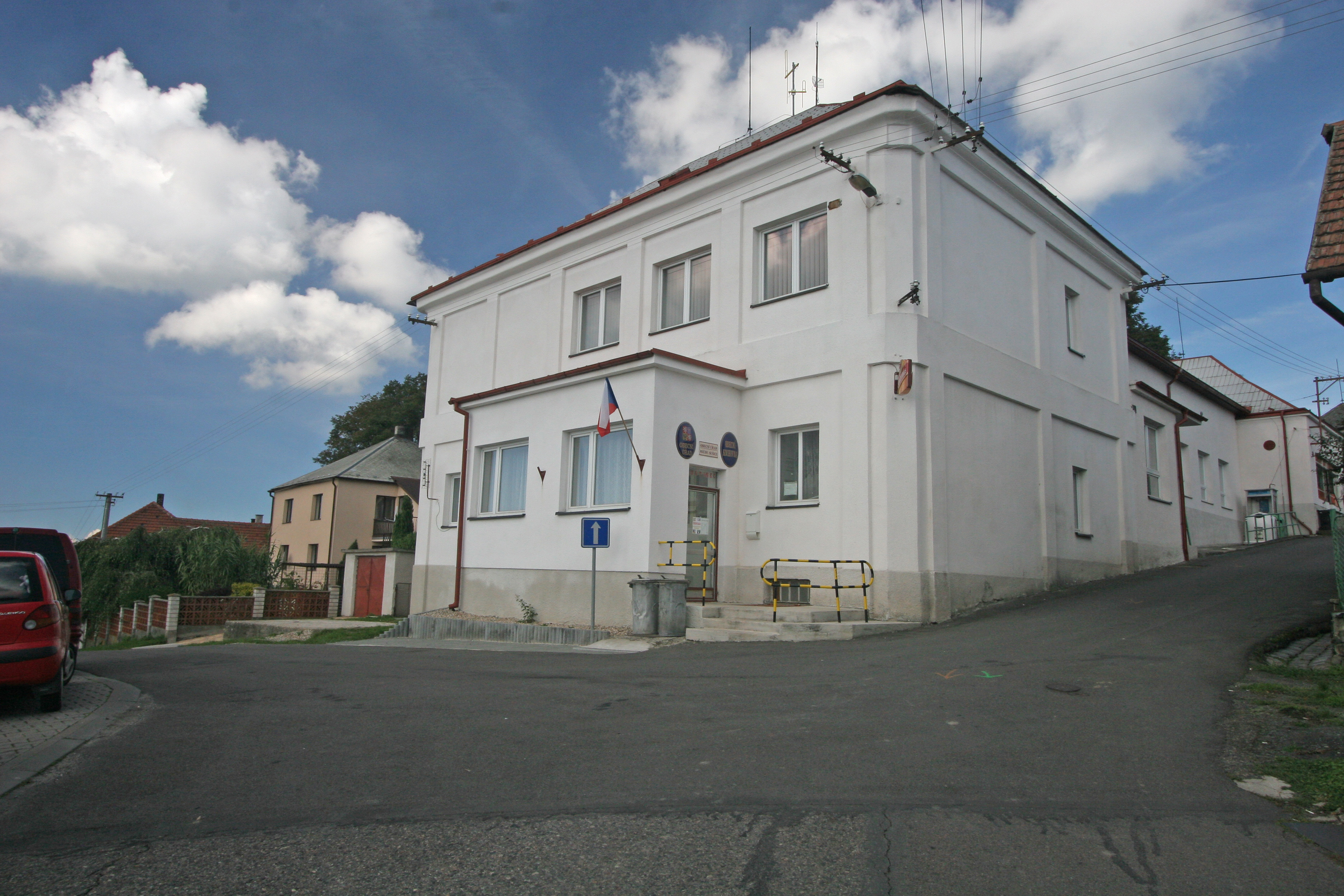
- Municipal office in Míčov

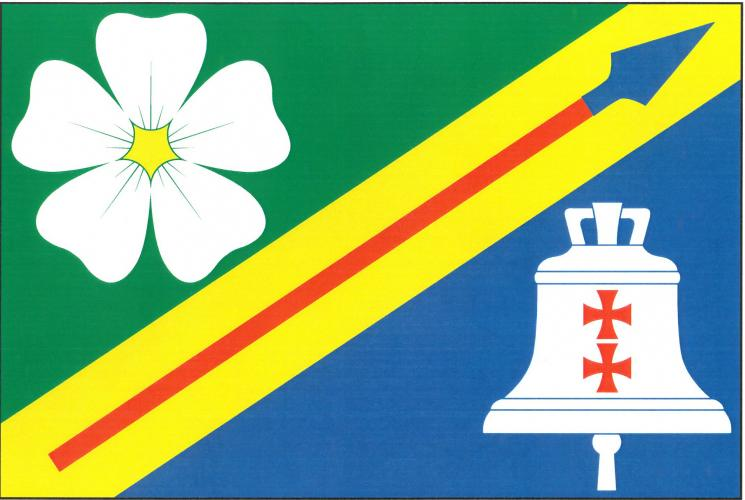
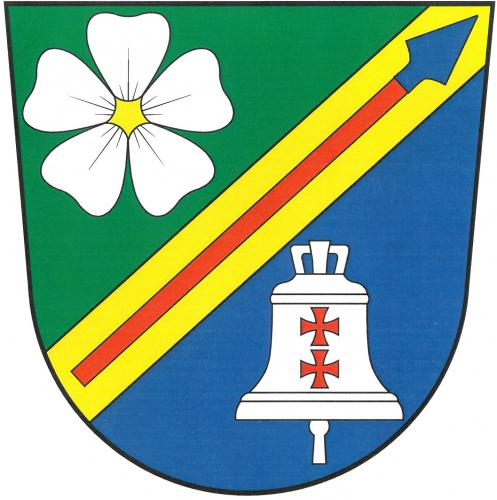
- Flag Coat of arms

- Location in the Czech Republic
- Coordinates: 49°58′4″N 15°52′2″E
- Country: Czech Republic
- Region: Pardubice
- District: Chrudim
- First mentioned: 1349

Area
  - Total: 12.37 km^{2} (4.78 sq mi)
- Elevation: 533 m (1,749 ft)

Population (2026-01-01)
  - Total: 267
  - Density: 21.6/km^{2} (55.9/sq mi)
- Time zone: UTC+1 (CET)
  - Summer (DST): UTC+2 (CEST)
- Postal code: 538 03
- Website: www.micov-susice.cz

Míčov-Sušice is a municipality in Chrudim District in the Pardubice Region of the Czech Republic. It has about 300 inhabitants.

== Administrative division ==
Míčov-Sušice consists of five municipal parts (in brackets population according to the 2021 census):

- Míčov (147)
- Sušice (53)
- Jetonice (17)
- Rudov (15)
- Zbyslavec (38)

== Demographics ==
Historical population
Year	Pop.	±%
1869	757	—
1880	763	+0.8%
1890	757	−0.8%
1900	748	−1.2%
1910	888	+18.7%
1921	851	−4.2%
1930	680	−20.1%
1950	503	−26.0%
1961	522	+3.8%
1970	430	−17.6%
1980	372	−13.5%
1991	301	−19.1%
2001	291	−3.3%
2011	258	−11.3%
2021	270	+4.7%
Source: Censuses
