= Chicago Center for Green Technology =

Building in Chicago, Illinois

Coordinates: 41.8896°N 87.7009°W

The Chicago Center for Green Technology was a 34,000-square-foot (3,200 m^{2}) US Green Building Council LEED Platinum certified building located on a plot of 17 acres (69,000 m^{2}) in Chicago's East Garfield Park Community built to showcase green technologies. This was the first municipal and brownfield site to win a LEED Platinum award. This project was completed as part of Mayor Richard M. Daley's Chicago Brownfield Initiative (CBI). The center offered workshops focusing on green technology and sustainable design, a green building resource center, and self-guided or guided tours to visitors.

The center ceased operations in October 2014, though has since resumed operations.

== History ==
Originally constructed in 1952, the site and building have been owned by many different companies. In 1995, the Sacramento Crushing Company, a construction and demolition debris recycling company occupied the site. Sacramento Crushing had exceeded the scope of its permit and the Chicago Department of Environment began an investigation. The 17-acre (69,000 m^{2}) site was filled more than 600,000 cubic yards of waste that had been illegally dumped over three decades. This debris was piled 70 feet (21 m) high and caused 15-foot (4.6 m) compaction on some areas of the site. The Illinois EPA cited the company for illegal dumping and operation of a waste storage and treatment facility.

== Renovation ==
Renovation of the 32,000 sq ft (3,000 m^{2}). building cost a total of $5.4 million and lasted from 1999 to 2003, at which point it was opened to the public. Before the formal design process began, it was decided that the main goal of the renovation was going to be that the building had to pass the U.S. Green Building Council's LEED Platinum rating, which is the highest LEED rating a building can get. The goal to have the building be LEED Platinum certified was the determining factor in all building decisions, such as mechanical, electrical, and ventilation systems. All aspects of the building were optimized in order to reduce waste during the construction process, and energy waste during the operation of the building once it was completely renovated.

== Sustainable features ==
The Chicago Center for Green Technology uses about 40% less energy than a building of the same size due to the multiple ways it gathers and conserves its energy. Solar panels on the roof, on awnings around the building, and an array of solar panels in a lot behind the building provide 20% of the building's energy. Passive heating is provided by large double-paned and insulated glass windows that also provide large amounts of light. Another source of heat or air-conditioning, depending on what season it is, comes from 28 vertical wells beneath the building that go to a depth of 200 feet, at which point the temperature is relatively constant. Water is pumped down the wells and then extracted, which helps cool the building in the summer and heat it in the winter. A smart lighting system throughout the building detects the amount of natural light and adjusts the amount of light provided by electricity. Scrap cork flooring and recycled glass bathroom tiles make up part of the building materials, which come from more than 40% recycled material. The Center for Green Technology has a green roof, which consists of 3 inches (76 mm) of soil and plant matter. The green roof helps to absorb rainwater and insulate the building. Rainwater is released from downspouts into the soil, as opposed to the public sewer system, in order to reduce the amount of run-off contaminants in the sewers. The landscaping around the building is irrigated with rain water that is stored in cisterns, which helps reduce the amount of treated water from the city.

== Community involvement ==
A few of Chicago's most environmentally friendly businesses operate out of the Chicago Center for Green Technology. Chicago Department of Environment's Greencorps Chicago Program is located at CCGT. "Greencorps Chicago is the City of Chicago's paid green-industry job training program focused on horticulture, landscaping, ecological restoration, and tree care. Training takes place in the classroom and on field projects."
