= Kedzie station (Metra) =

Commuter rail station in Chicago, Illinois

Kedzie

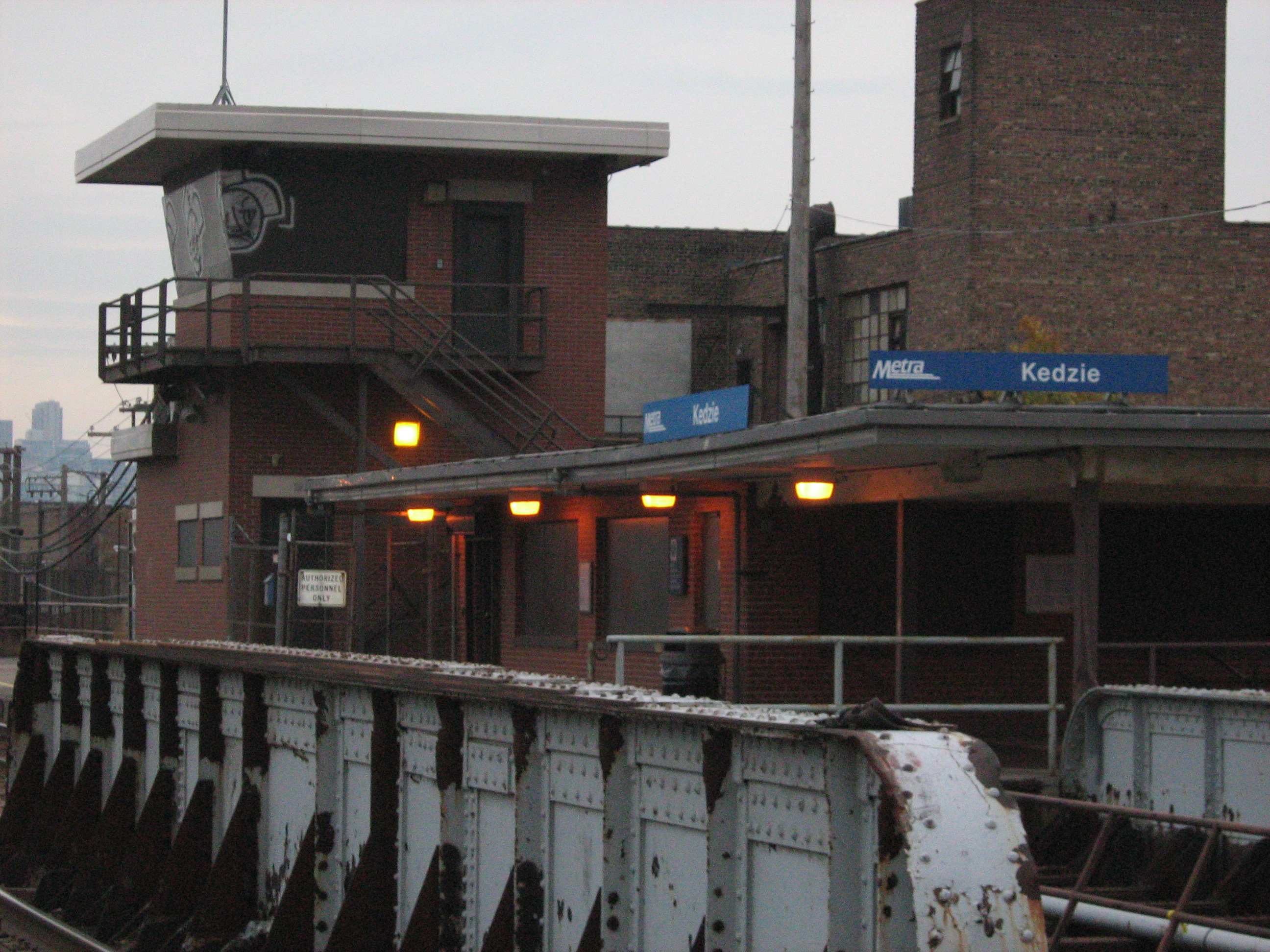

General information
- Location: North Kedzie Avenue & West Carroll Avenue; Chicago, Illinois
- Coordinates: 41.8882°N 87.7069°W
- Owner: Union Pacific
- Platforms: 1 side platform, 1 island platform
- Tracks: 5
- Connections: CTA Buses

Construction
- Accessible: No

Other information
- Fare zone: 2

History
- Opened: 1947; 79 years ago

Passengers
- 2018: 41 (average weekday) ▼21.2%
- Rank: 214 out of 236

Services
Preceding station	Metra	Following station
Oak Park toward Elburn	Union Pacific West	Ogilvie TC Terminus
Former services
Preceding station	Chicago and North Western Railway	Following station
Oak Park toward Omaha	Main Line	Chicago Terminus
Austin toward Geneva	Galena Division	Chicago Terminus
Track layout
Location

Kedzie is a Metra commuter railroad station in the East Garfield Park neighborhood on the West Side of Chicago, Illinois, United States. It is served by the Union Pacific West Line.

The station is at North Kedzie Avenue and West Carroll Avenue in an industrial and low-income residential neighborhood. The Chicago Transit Authority's elevated Kedzie station is on West Lake Street, about three blocks to the south. The Garfield Park Conservatory is nearby, and George Westinghouse College Prep is just north of the station. The Union Pacific's California Avenue yard, where Metra coaches for the Union Pacific lines are stored during the day, is just to the east.

As of September 8, 2025, Kedzie is served by 45 trains (22 inbound, 23 outbound) on weekdays, by all 20 trains (10 in each direction) on Saturdays, and by all 18 trains (nine in each direction) on Sundays and holidays. As of 2018, Kedzie is the 214th busiest of the 236 non-downtown stations in the Metra system, with an average of 41 weekday boardings.

== Bus and rail connections ==
CTA Green Line

- Kedzie

CTA Buses

- 52 Kedzie
