= John H. Kedzie =

American politician

- Born: September 8, 1815; Stamford, New York, U.S.
- Died: April 9, 1903 (aged 87); Chicago, Illinois, U.S.
- Education: Oberlin College
- Occupations: lawyer; real estate developer; politician
- Spouses: Mary Elizabeth Austin (m. 1850; died 1854); Mary Elizabeth (m. 1857)
- Children: 5

John Hume Kedzie (1815–1903) was an American lawyer, real-estate developer, and politician.

== Early life ==
John Kedzie was born September 8, 1815, in Stamford, New York, the son of Scottish immigrants. He graduated from Oberlin College in Oberlin, Ohio, in 1841, and was admitted to the bar in 1847. In 1847 he moved to Chicago to begin his law practice. After his arrival in Chicago he observed that Chicago was a bustling city with a fast-growing population that would soon outstrip its available space for housing the burgeoning population. Looking around, he realized that surrounding the city were large tracts of undeveloped land on which new neighborhoods and towns could be built to accommodate the burgeoning population—and coincidentally earn large profits for those with money to invest in land.

== Real estate ==
Soon he gave up his law practice to take up real-estate development. With partners Luther L. Greenleaf, Cyrus P. Leland and John P. Wilson he formed the Ravenswood Land Company. The company purchased 200 acres (0.81 km^{2}) of land near the Chicago and Great Western Railroad tracks in what is now—not coincidentally–the Ravenswood neighborhood on Northwest Side of Chicago.

The company planned and developed land in Evanston. In 1868, Kedzie and Greenleaf moved to Evanston and were instrumental in laying out the Kedzie and Keeney's addition, which formed the nucleus of South Evanston. He was also involved in founding and developing Ravenswood and took an active part in laying out the Lurton and Kedzie addition to Jacksonville.

Kedzie built his home in Evanston on Ridge Avenue. Unfortunately his home burned down in 1873 and after rebuilding, the new home also burned in 1880. The third home on the same lot in Evanston stood firm but was demolished in 1967.

== Personal life ==
Kedzie married twice. In July 1850, he married Mary Elizabeth Austin of Greene County, New York but she died July 16, 1854. Three years later he married Mary Elizabeth of Chicago and they became the parents of five children.

He espoused the cause of the abolitionist party, and met with five or six others in the first meetings held to organize the Republican Party in Illinois.

He was president of the Illinois Saint Andrew Society in 1854.

Kedzie and his partner Luther Greenleaf were benefactors to the city of Evanston, helping to found the Evanston Free Public Library in 1873, and Kedzie served as the first president of the library board. Luther Greenleaf was an early trustee and benefactor of the newly founded Northwestern University in Evanston. Greenleaf is remembered for purchasing the library of Johannes Schulze, a collection of 20,000 volumes of German and Classical writings, for the University's library.

In later years Kedzie served in the Illinois House of Representatives.

Kedzie died April 9, 1903, at the age of 87. He was interred in Rosehill Cemetery, in Chicago, near the neighborhood he helped create.

== Namesakes ==
Kedzie Avenue on the Chicago's West Side and Kedzie Street in Evanston are named for John H. Kedzie.
