= Berkeley, Illinois =

- Village
- Flag Seal

- Location of Berkeley in Cook County, Illinois.

- Location within Greater Chicago Location within Illinois Location within the United States
- Coordinates: 41°53′12″N 87°54′38″W
- Country: United States
- State: Illinois
- County: Cook
- Township: Proviso
- Incorporated: 1924

Government
  - Type: President-Trustee
  - President: Robert E. Lee, Jr.

Area
  - Total: 1.40 sq mi (3.63 km^{2})
  - Land: 1.40 sq mi (3.63 km^{2})
  - Water: 0 sq mi (0.00 km^{2}) 0%

Population (2020)
  - Total: 5,338
  - Density: 3,808.8/sq mi (1,470.57/km^{2})

Standard of living (2007–11)
  - Per capita income: $25,952
  - Median home value: $202,200
- ZIP code(s): 60163
- Area code(s): 708/464
- Geocode: 17-05404
- FIPS code: 17-05404
- Website: www.berkeley.il.us

Berkeley (pronounced BURK-lee) is a village in Cook County, Illinois, United States. Incorporated in 1924, the population at the 2020 census was 5,338.

The town has a commuter railroad station on Metra's Union Pacific West Line with service to downtown Chicago.

Berkeley is situated fourteen miles west of the Chicago Loop in Cook County. Berkeley is on the western edge of Cook County. Berkeley has instant access to the metropolitan area, with Interstates 290 and 294 comprising its western and part of its southern boundaries, and the Union Pacific Railroad (originally the Chicago & North Western) and the large Proviso classification yard to the north. However, the transit arteries that link Berkeley to separate locations also function to isolate the village from its close neighbors, providing it a small-town atmosphere.

== History ==
Farmers, mostly of German and Dutch heritage, began to settle in the region that would become Berkeley around 1835. The Dutch sought to be truck farmers, dwelling on farms spanning from 40 to 160 acres, whereas the Germans conducted general farming. In 1848, a small group of farm families founded Sunnyside, a one-room school. Sunnyside Elementary School is still in operation today, however it is now located in a bigger and newer structure.

Farmland was provided for what is now known as Old Settler's Cemetery a short distance west on St. Charles Road (which was finished in 1836). Many of the area's earliest settlers remain buried there.

The Chicago, Aurora & Elgin Railroad (interurban) opened in 1902, providing the area with its first passenger rail service at Berkeley. Subdivisions were made in 1908 and again in 1914–1915 introduced new residential building and new inhabitants to the region, who were mostly English. Berkeley became a village in 1924, thanks to the efforts of these people.

The early 1900s population surge paled in comparison to the post-World War II population explosion in Berkeley, which saw the village population triple from 1,882 in 1950 to 5,792 in 1960. Berkeley also lost a number of homes when the Interstate 290 expansion was built in the late 1950s, cutting a north–south swath across the village's western part. The Chicago, Aurora & Elgin Railway ceased passenger service in 1957 when traffic was transferred to the new expressway system, but its path is still preserved through the community by the Prairie Path for bicyclists.

Berkeley bought property from the railroad in the 1960s to stretch its northern borders, enabling for the development of a small industrial park. Electrical contractors, printing firms, warehouses, wholesalers, and the World Dryer Corporation, one of the world's largest hand dryer manufacturers, were among the facility's 12 light industries in 2000. Berkeley, on the other hand, has remained mostly a residential neighborhood. Many of the residents who bought houses in the village in the 1950s stayed into the 1990s. The village anticipated large residential turnover when these long-term homeowners sold their homes at the turn of the twenty-first century.

== Geography ==
Berkeley is located at 41°53′12″N 87°54′38″W (41.886794, -87.910528).

According to the 2021 census gazetteer files, Berkeley has a total area of 1.40 square miles (3.63 km^{2}), all land.

== Demographics ==
Historical population
Census	Pop.	Note	%±
1930	779		—
1940	724		−7.1%
1950	1,882		159.9%
1960	5,792		207.8%
1970	6,152		6.2%
1980	5,467		−11.1%
1990	5,137		−6.0%
2000	5,245		2.1%
2010	5,209		−0.7%
2020	5,338		2.5%
U.S. Decennial Census 2010–2020

=== Racial and ethnic composition ===
Berkeley village, Illinois – Racial and ethnic composition Note: the US Census treats Hispanic/Latino as an ethnic category. This table excludes Latinos from the racial categories and assigns them to a separate category. Hispanics/Latinos may be of any race.
Race / Ethnicity (NH = Non-Hispanic)	Pop 2000	Pop 2010	Pop 2020	% 2000	% 2010	% 2020
White alone (NH)	2,712	1,684	1,242	51.71%	32.33%	23.27%
Black or African American alone (NH)	1,447	1,610	1,718	27.59%	30.91%	32.18%
Native American or Alaska Native alone (NH)	4	17	13	0.08%	0.33%	0.24%
Asian alone (NH)	198	199	219	3.78%	3.82%	4.10%
Pacific Islander alone (NH)	0	1	3	0.00%	0.02%	0.06%
Other race alone (NH)	10	4	13	0.19%	0.08%	0.24%
Mixed race or Multiracial (NH)	60	96	122	1.14%	1.84%	2.29%
Hispanic or Latino (any race)	814	1,598	2,008	15.52%	30.68%	37.62%
Total	5,245	5,209	5,338	100.00%	100.00%	100.00%

=== 2020 census ===
As of the 2020 census, Berkeley had a population of 5,338, with 1,853 households and 1,339 families residing in the village. The population density was 3,807.42 inhabitants per square mile (1,470.05/km^{2}). There were 1,933 housing units at an average density of 1,378.74 per square mile (532.33/km^{2}).

The median age was 41.2 years. About 19.5% of residents were under the age of 18, and 15.9% were 65 years of age or older. For every 100 females, there were 95.2 males, and for every 100 females age 18 and over, there were 92.7 males.

Among households, 34.9% had children under the age of 18 living in them. Married-couple households made up 46.5% of households, while 18.6% had a male householder with no spouse or partner present and 27.5% had a female householder with no spouse or partner present. About 22.3% of all households were made up of individuals, and 8.8% had someone living alone who was 65 years of age or older.

Of the housing stock, 4.1% of units were vacant. The homeowner vacancy rate was 1.7%, and the rental vacancy rate was 5.8%.

About 100.0% of residents lived in urban areas, while 0.0% lived in rural areas.

=== Income and poverty ===
The median income for a household in the village was $71,025, and the median income for a family was $72,051. Males had a median income of $48,333 versus $30,346 for females. The per capita income for the village was $29,940. About 0.5% of families and 3.1% of the population were below the poverty line, including 0.0% of those under age 18 and 9.7% of those age 65 or over.

== Education ==
Most children in Berkeley attend schools in Berkeley School District 87, which are Jefferson Primary School, Sunnyside Elementary School and MacArthur Middle School. Others attend Hillside School in Hillside School District 93.

Proviso Township High Schools District 209 operates public high schools. The community is served by Proviso West High School in Hillside. Berkeley residents may apply to Proviso Math & Science Academy in Forest Park.

Private school education is available in the Berkeley area with Immanuel Lutheran grade schools in Hillside, Immaculate Conception, Visitation, and Immanuel Lutheran grade schools in neighboring Elmhurst. High school age students have several schools to choose from in the Berkeley area including Immaculate Conception High School in Elmhurst and Nazareth Academy in LaGrange Park. Timothy Christian school in Elmhurst is also an option and has students from K through 12. Lastly, an option that has been growing in popularity is Walther Christian Academy in Melrose Park.

== Transportation ==
The Berkeley station provides Metra commuter rail service along the Union Pacific West Line to the community. Trains travel east to Ogilvie Transportation Center in Chicago and west to Elburn station. Pace provides bus service on routes 301 and 313 connecting Berkeley to destinations across the region.

== Companies based in Berkeley ==
- Vanee Foods
- Preferred Meals
- World Dryer
- Honey-Can-Do International
- Conflowence

== Sister city ==
The village has a sister city in England, Berkeley, Gloucestershire.
