= Westchester Public School District 92½ =

School district in Illinois, United States

Address
- 9981 Canterbury Street Westchester, Illinois, 60154; United States

District information
- Type: Public
- Grades: PreK–8
- NCES District ID: 1741790

Students and staff
- Students: 1,060

Other information
- Website: www.sd925.org

Westchester Public School District 92½ is an elementary school district based in the central Cook County village of Westchester, an Illinois suburb of Chicago. The District is composed of three schools: a primary school, an intermediate school, and a middle school; all schools are located within the Village of Westchester District limits. Westchester School District students attend Proviso West High School in Hillside. Westchester residents may apply to Proviso Math & Science Academy in Forest Park.

District students begin their education in Westchester Primary School, which serves pre-kindergarten, half-day kindergarten, first and second grades under direction of Principal Lora Lafin Students in third through fifth grades attend Westchester Intermediate School. Which the principal there is Shawn Barret The last leg of education students experience in the District is at Westchester Middle School students in grades six through eight are educated under direction of Principal Greg Leban and Assistant Principal Kurnain Scott. District 92½'s superintendent is Dr. Philip Salemi and assistant superintendent, Stephanie DelFiacco.

== Notable alumni ==
- Julian Love, NFL player for the Seattle Seahawks
