= Westchester, Illinois =

- Village
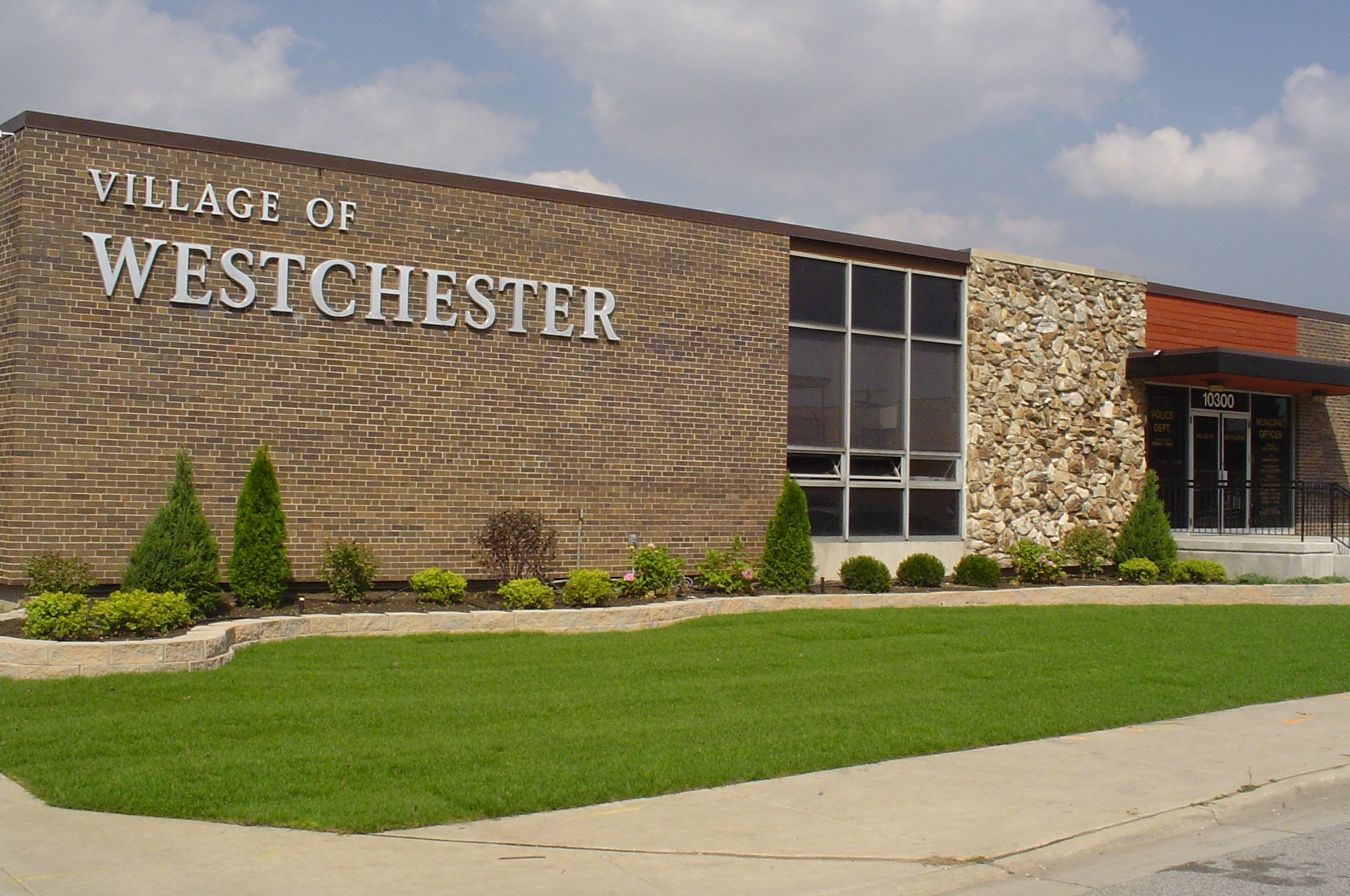
- Westchester, Illinois Village Hall on Roosevelt Rd.

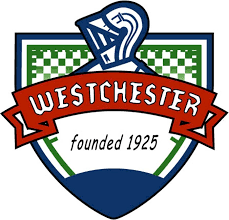
- Flag Seal
- Motto: "A good place to live"
- Location of Westchester in Cook County, Illinois.

- Location within Greater Chicago Location within Illinois Location within the United States
- Coordinates: 41°51′14″N 87°53′1″W
- Country: United States
- State: Illinois
- County: Cook
- Founded: 1925

Government
  - Type: Village
  - President: Greg Hribal

Area
  - Total: 3.69 sq mi (9.55 km^{2})
  - Land: 3.69 sq mi (9.55 km^{2})
  - Water: 0 sq mi (0.00 km^{2})

Population (2020)
  - Total: 16,892
  - Density: 4,583.0/sq mi (1,769.51/km^{2})
- Time zone: UTC-6 (CST)
  - Summer (DST): UTC-5 (CDT)
- ZIP Code(s): 60154
- Area code: 708
- FIPS code: 17-80047
- Website: www.westchester-il.gov

Westchester is a village in Cook County, Illinois, United States. It is a western suburb of Chicago. The population was 16,892 at the 2020 census.

== History ==
The area now known as Westchester was occupied by German farmers beginning in the mid-19th century. Samuel Insull purchased the land in 1924 with plans to develop it for residential use and create an English-style town. As a result, the town's name and the majority of its street names are of English origin.

The Great Depression slowed development during the 1930s, although the population continued to grow. The town's suburban development was stimulated by its being the western terminal of Chicago's Garfield Park rapid transit line. The extension of the line was removed in 1951. In 1956, the federal government began postwar construction of the Interstate Highway System, resulting in the construction of nearby expressways I-290 and I-294. These have provided residents with car-based travel in the region, however they also serve as barriers against access to neighboring communities.

Residential and retail development has consumed nearly all open land within the village, save for the protected 85-acre (340,000 m^{2}) of Wolf Road Prairie. It is the largest black-soil prairie remnant east of the Mississippi River.

== Geography ==
According to the 2010 census, Westchester has a total area of 3.69 square miles (9.56 km^{2}), all land. It shares its western border with Du Page County.

== Demographics ==
Historical population
Census	Pop.	Note	%±
1930	358		—
1940	621		73.5%
1950	4,308		593.7%
1960	18,092		320.0%
1970	20,033		10.7%
1980	17,730		−11.5%
1990	17,301		−2.4%
2000	16,824		−2.8%
2010	16,718		−0.6%
2020	16,892		1.0%
U.S. Decennial Census; 2010 2020

=== Racial and ethnic composition ===
Westchester village, Illinois – Racial and ethnic composition Note: the US Census treats Hispanic/Latino as an ethnic category. This table excludes Latinos from the racial categories and assigns them to a separate category. Hispanics/Latinos may be of any race.
Race / Ethnicity (NH = Non-Hispanic)	Pop 2000	Pop 2010	Pop 2020	% 2000	% 2010	% 2020
White alone (NH)	13,919	11,018	8,877	82.73%	65.91%	52.55%
Black or African American alone (NH)	1,207	2,349	3,311	7.17%	14.05%	19.60%
Native American or Alaska Native alone (NH)	4	21	14	0.02%	0.13%	0.08%
Asian alone (NH)	576	659	687	3.42%	3.94%	4.07%
Native Hawaiian or Pacific Islander alone (NH)	1	1	2	0.01%	0.01%	0.01%
Other race alone (NH)	12	15	55	0.07%	0.09%	0.33%
Mixed race or Multiracial (NH)	149	170	396	0.89%	1.02%	2.34%
Hispanic or Latino (any race)	956	2,485	3,550	5.68%	14.86%	21.02%
Total	16,824	16,718	16,892	100.00%	100.00%	100.00%

=== 2020 census ===
As of the 2020 census, Westchester had a population of 16,892. The population density was 4,582.75 inhabitants per square mile (1,769.41/km^{2}). There were 7,230 housing units at an average density of 1,961.48 units per square mile (757.33 units/km^{2}).

The median age was 48.3 years. 17.0% of residents were under the age of 18 and 24.3% of residents were 65 years of age or older. For every 100 females there were 90.4 males, and for every 100 females age 18 and over there were 87.1 males age 18 and over.

100.0% of residents lived in urban areas, while 0.0% lived in rural areas.

There were 6,930 households in Westchester, and 4,385 families residing in the village. Of all households, 24.5% had children under the age of 18 living in them. About 50.1% were married-couple households, 14.9% were households with a male householder and no spouse or partner present, and 29.6% were households with a female householder and no spouse or partner present. About 28.2% of all households were made up of individuals, and 15.5% had someone living alone who was 65 years of age or older. The average household size was 3.00 and the average family size was 2.36.

Of the 7,230 housing units, 4.1% were vacant. The homeowner vacancy rate was 1.7% and the rental vacancy rate was 4.2%.

=== Income and poverty ===
The median income for a household in the village was $88,861, and the median income for a family was $108,067. Males had a median income of $57,055 versus $48,533 for females. The per capita income for the village was $43,868. About 2.3% of families and 3.7% of the population were below the poverty line, including 4.1% of those under age 18 and 4.0% of those age 65 or over.

== Government ==
Westchester is completely within Illinois' 7th congressional district being represented by Danny Davis.

Greg Hribal is currently serving his second term as the Village President in Westchester, Illinois, having been re-elected to a four-year term in 2025. He was first elected to the position in 2023 as a successful write-in candidate.

== Economy ==
Westchester is home to Westbrook Corporate Center, located at Wolf Road and Cermak Road. Constructed in 1986 and renovated in 1996, the complex consists of five 10-story towers encompassing more than 1 million square feet (93,000 m^{2}) of office space. Westbrook Corporate Center has won the 2000/2001 BOMA- International Office Building of the Year Award, 2000/2001 BOMA- North Central Region Office Building of the Year Award, and 1998/1999, 1999/2000, 2000/2001 BOMA- Suburban Chicago Office Building of the Year Award.

=== Top employers ===
According to the Village's 2012 Comprehensive Annual Financial Report, the top employers in the city are:

#	Employer
1	G4S Secure Solutions Inc
2	Corn Products International (Ingredion)
3	Sogeti
4	Chicago Laborers Pension & Welfare Funds
5	CommScope Corp (Andrew Solutions)
6	Insurance Auto Auctions
7	Yellow Book USA, Inc
8	Revenue Cycle Solutions
9	Per Mar Security Services
10	Healthcare Financial Management Association

== Education ==
=== Public schools ===
Westchester Public School District 92½ serves most of the city. There are four schools in this district:

- Westchester Primary School (Preschool – 2nd grade)
- Westchester Intermediate School (3rd grade – 5th grade)
- Westchester Middle School (6th grade – 8th grade)
- Britten School (Special Needs)

In addition Hillside School District 93, which operates a single K-8 school in Hillside, serves a section of Westchester. In 1968 the school district proposed a bond for a junior high school, on a 12.5-acre (5.1 ha) parcel of land in Westchester. The voters rejected the referendum and the plans were scrapped. The president of Concord Homes, Roger Mankedick, stated in the Chicago Sun-Times that the student population that was supposed to surround the school never came. The Chicago Tribune stated there was a decline in students in the area surrounding the school site. In 1998 the district instead sold the land to Concord Homes for $2.6 million.

Proviso Township High Schools District 209 serves high school residents. Zoned students attend Proviso West High School in Hillside. Westchester residents may apply to Proviso Math & Science Academy in Forest Park.

=== Private schools ===
The following private Catholic school of the Roman Catholic Archdiocese of Chicago is located in the village:

- Divine Providence School (PS–8)

Other private schools are located in the village:

- Immanuel Christian Academy (K–8, Lutheran)
- Westchester Christian School (K-12, Non-Denominational)
- PAEC Academy (K-8, Special Needs)

== Transportation ==
Residents of Westchester have a small variety of transportation options available to them. Cermak Road and Roosevelt Road are two major stroads that cut through the village. Residents also have bus service through Pace Bus Service, with routes 301, 317, and 330 serving the community. Route 317 follows the former extension to the CTA Blue Line before it was removed. Pace is planning for a Pulse rapid transit route to be constructed along the Cermak corridor, currently served by the 322 route. Service is planned to begin in 2029. There have been calls to restore Blue Line service to the community and plans have existed, however, CTA currently has no plans to extend the Blue Line from Forest Park. Westchester has a Walk Score of 43, meaning most errands require driving a car. The village also has several zoning provisions that foster car dependency, such as minimum parking requirements.

== Recreation ==
The Village of Westchester is home to the Westchester Park District, which provides many recreational amenities and activities for both residents and non-residents. There are also five different golf courses available within 3 miles or a 10-minute drive from Westchester: The Chicago Highlands Club; located on the southwest side of the village, Fresh Meadows Golf Club in Hillside, Meadowlark Golf Course in Hinsdale, and The Oakbrook Golf Club and Butler National Golf Club in Oakbrook. Additionally, Westchester is home to Eden Lanes Bowling Alley, Focus Time Escape Rooms, the Wolf Road Prairie, the Westchester Woods Sledding Hill, 4 youth sports organizations, and multiple forest preserves.

=== Parks and playgrounds ===
- Camberly Park
- Community Park
- Drury Lane Park
- Gladstone Park
- High Ridge Park
- Mayfair Park
- Middle School Athletic Fields
- Norfolk Park
- Primary School Park
- Sweetbriar Park
- Forest the Fox's Playbox at the Mayfair Recreation Center

=== Fitness ===
- Westchester Community Center
- Mayfair Recreation Center
- Anytime Fitness

=== Aquatics ===
John J. Sinde Community Swimming Pool serves as Westchester's public pool. The facility was dedicated with a ribbon-cutting event on June 5, 1977, and officially opened on June 11, 1977. The facility features a beautiful 50-meter pool with a 12-foot-deep diving well. Other enjoyable features are a separate zero-depth wading pool with bubblers. The main pool has a 25-foot-high, 150-foot-long water slide and an SCS interactive water play structure in the shallow end. A concession stand and grass area round out the facility. The facility is typically in operation from Memorial Day through Labor Day.
The Chicago Highlands Club also boasts an outdoor seasonal pool, however those wishing to use it must possess a membership to the club or be a guest of a current member.

== Notable people ==
- Philip Caputo, author and journalist (A Rumor of War)
- Marco D'Amico, mafia member of the Chicago Outfit
- Mario Anthony DeStefano, member of the Chicago Outfit
- Jim Durkin, state legislator representing Illinois' 82nd District
- Kathryn Hahn, actress (Crossing Jordan); born in Westchester
- Julian Love, NFL player (Seattle Seahawks)
- Cameron Meredith, NFL player (New Orleans Saints)
- Gene Pingatore, basketball coach at St. Joseph High School; lived in Westchester
- Saba, rapper and record producer
- Michael Sarno, member of the Chicago Outfit
- Daniel P. Ward, Chief Justice of the Illinois Supreme Court; lived in Westchester
- Bill Wightkin, NFL player (Chicago Bears); lived in Westchester
