= List of food manufacturers of Chicago =

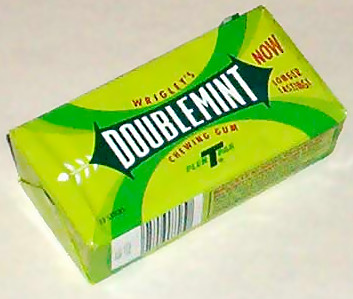
Doublemint gum, manufactured by the Wrigley Company since 1914

Since the 1830s, when Chicago enjoyed a brief period of importance as a local milling center for spring wheat, the city has long been a center for the conversion of raw farm products into edible goods. Since the 1880s, Chicago has also been home to firms in other areas of the food processing industry, including cereals, baked goods, and candy.

In the twenty-first century, companies such as The Kraft Heinz Company, Wrigley, Sara Lee, and Tootsie Roll Industries, all maintain operations within the Chicago metropolitan area.

== Food manufacturers ==
Below is a list of notable food manufacturers with current or historical ties to Chicago.

- A.J. Canfield Company
- Armour and Company
- Brach's
- Budlong Pickle Company
- Chicago Bar Co.
- Cloverhill Bakery
- ConAgra
- Cracker Jack
- Curtiss Candy Company
- Eli's Cheesecake
- Ferrara Pan Candy Company
- Fortune Brands
- Fuhrman and Forster Company
- Garrett Popcorn Shops
- Goose Island Brewery
- Jays Foods, Inc.
- Keebler Company
- Koval Distillery
- Kraft Heinz Company
- Kronos Foods
- M&M/Mars
- Mondelēz International
- Morton Salt
- Nabisco
- Oscar Mayer
- Parker House Sausage Company
- Quaker Oats Company
- Sara Lee Corporation
- Sweet Baby Ray's
- Swift & Company
- Tootsie Roll Industries
- Tropicana Products
- Urban Accents
- US Foods
- Vanee Foods
- Vienna Beef
- Wm. Wrigley Jr. Company
- Woman's Canning and Preserving Company
- World's Finest Chocolate

== See also ==
- IGA
- List of food companies
