= Stone Park, Illinois =

- Village
- Seal

- Location of Stone Park in Cook County, Illinois.

- Location within Greater Chicago Location within Illinois Location within the United States
- Coordinates: 41°54′16″N 87°52′50″W
- Country: United States
- State: Illinois
- County: Cook

Area
  - Total: 0.34 sq mi (0.89 km^{2})
  - Land: 0.34 sq mi (0.89 km^{2})
  - Water: 0 sq mi (0.00 km^{2})

Population (2020)
  - Total: 4,576
  - Density: 13,318.2/sq mi (5,142.17/km^{2})
- Time zone: UTC-6 (CST)
  - Summer (DST): UTC-5 (CDT)
- ZIP Code(s): 60165
- Area codes: 708/464
- FIPS code: 17-72923
- Website: www.vosp.us

Stone Park is a village in Cook County, Illinois, United States. The population was 4,576 at the 2020 census. Incorporated in 1939, the town was named for insurance magnate Clement Stone, who bought most of the land when it was still corn fields.

== History ==
In 2014 the Village of Stone Park celebrated its 75th anniversary. On April 26, 1939, the Village of Stone Park was incorporated. Since then, it has grown from 50 homes to over 800 homes and from hundreds of residents to thousands, of which many still live in the Village from the day of incorporation.

In 2013 the Missionary Sisters of St. Charles Borromeo Scalabrinians and community residents in Stone Park celebrated victory in preventing a strip club, called Get It, from opening next to the convent.

In 2010, a strip club developer sued the village, alleging that officials had tried to extort cash and part ownership of the club in exchange for approval to build the facility. Although most of the village ordinances were unchallenged by the suit, the village agreed to repeal or amend some ordinances as part of a settlement. These included a local ordinance similar to the state statute that created a 1,000-foot (300 m) buffer zone between adult entertainment businesses and schools, parks, churches and residential areas. The Stone Park mayor said that the village chose not to defend against the lawsuit because it would cost $500,000.

Notable residents of Stone Park have included Screen Actors Guild actor and author Ted Zalewski, foremost U.S. interpreter of Teddy Roosevelt.

In 2020, after a failed unionization attempt, the village outsourced its fire protection services to nearby Melrose Park, Illinois, rendering the village as one of the municipalities in the United States without a fire department of its own.

== Geography ==
Stone Park is located at 41°54′16″N 87°52′50″W (41.904330, -87.880486).

According to the 2010 census, Stone Park has a total area of 0.34 square miles (0.88 km^{2}), all land. This makes Stone Park the smallest incorporated community in all of Cook County by size.

== Demographics ==
Historical population
Census	Pop.	Note	%±
1940	636		—
1950	1,414		122.3%
1960	3,038		114.9%
1970	4,429		45.8%
1980	4,273		−3.5%
1990	4,383		2.6%
2000	5,127		17.0%
2010	4,946		−3.5%
2020	4,576		−7.5%
U.S. Decennial Census

As of the 2020 census, there were 4,576 people in the village.

=== Racial and ethnic composition ===
Stone Park village, Illinois – Racial and ethnic composition Note: the US Census treats Hispanic/Latino as an ethnic category. This table excludes Latinos from the racial categories and assigns them to a separate category. Hispanics/Latinos may be of any race.
Race / Ethnicity (NH = Non-Hispanic)	Pop 2000	Pop 2010	Pop 2020	% 2000	% 2010	% 2020
White alone (NH)	829	377	280	16.17%	7.62%	6.12%
Black or African American alone (NH)	86	82	134	1.68%	1.66%	2.93%
Native American or Alaska Native alone (NH)	13	5	3	0.25%	0.10%	0.07%
Asian alone (NH)	104	90	44	2.03%	1.82%	0.96%
Native Hawaiian or Pacific Islander alone (NH)	1	8	0	0.02%	0.16%	0.00%
Other race alone (NH)	0	3	6	0.00%	0.06%	0.13%
Mixed race or Multiracial (NH)	37	22	22	0.72%	0.44%	0.48%
Hispanic or Latino (any race)	4,057	4,359	4,087	79.13%	88.13%	89.31%
Total	5,127	4,946	4,576	100.00%	100.00%	100.00%

=== 2020 census ===
As of the 2020 census, Stone Park had a median age of 33.2 years. 26.6% of residents were under the age of 18 and 8.8% of residents were 65 years of age or older. For every 100 females there were 109.9 males, and for every 100 females age 18 and over there were 111.0 males age 18 and over.

100.0% of residents lived in urban areas, while 0.0% lived in rural areas.

There were 1,296 households in Stone Park, of which 48.3% had children under the age of 18 living in them. Of all households, 47.8% were married-couple households, 20.9% were households with a male householder and no spouse or partner present, and 21.4% were households with a female householder and no spouse or partner present. About 13.8% of all households were made up of individuals and 2.4% had someone living alone who was 65 years of age or older.

There were 1,382 housing units, of which 6.2% were vacant. The homeowner vacancy rate was 3.0% and the rental vacancy rate was 7.4%. The population density was 13,302.33 inhabitants per square mile (5,136.06/km^{2}) and the housing density was 4,017.44 per square mile (1,551.14/km^{2}).

=== Income and poverty ===
The median income for a household in the village was $63,710, and the median income for a family was $46,944. Males had a median income of $35,062 versus $23,848 for females. The per capita income for the village was $19,125. About 15.9% of families and 17.5% of the population were below the poverty line, including 32.0% of those under age 18 and 16.0% of those age 65 or over.

== Politics ==
Current Elected Officials

Beniamino Mazzulla	President
Laura Cassidy-Hatchet	Village Clerk
Loretta J. Teets	Trustee
Marco T. Paz	Trustee
Marco A. Gutiérrez	Trustee
Nazario García	Trustee
Sylvia Terrazas	Trustee
Simplisio Roman	Trustee

== Education ==
Bellwood School District 88 operates elementary schools. Students attend Grant Primary and Grant Elementary Schools.

Proviso Township High Schools District 209 operates public high schools. The community is served by Proviso West High School in Hillside. Stone Park residents may apply to Proviso Math & Science Academy in Forest Park.

== Transportation ==
Pace provides bus service on multiple routes connecting Stone Park to destinations across the region.
