= 6th Signal Command =

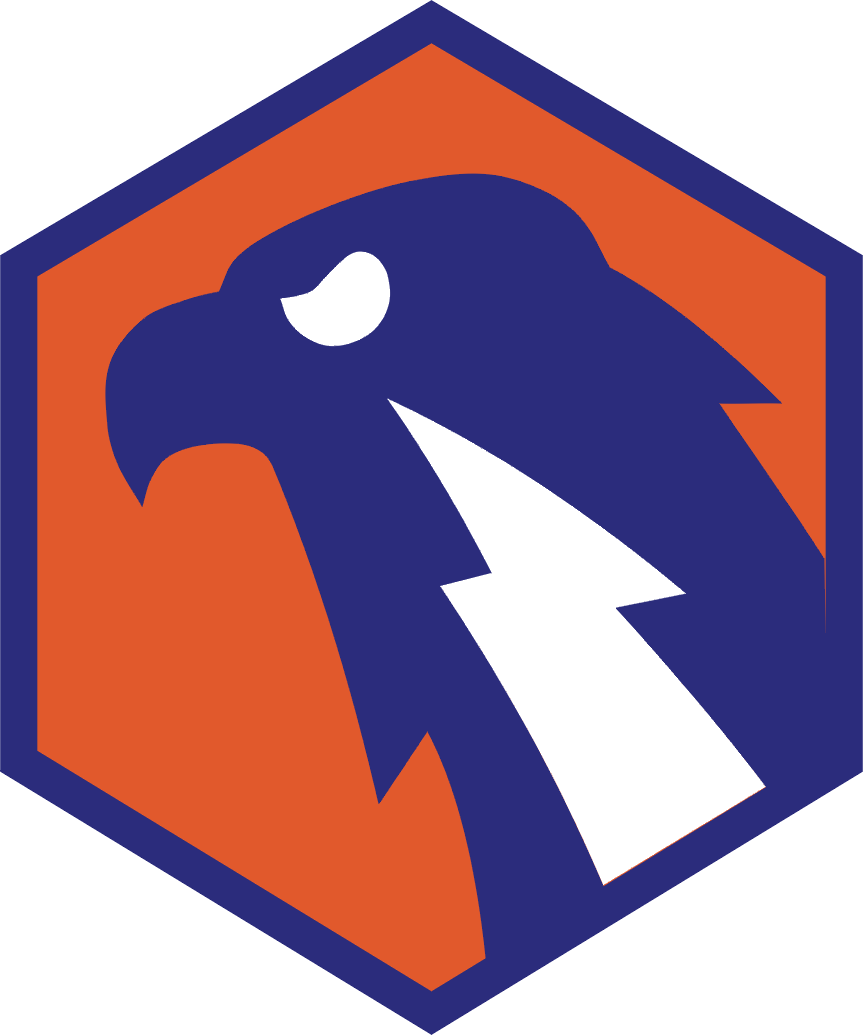
- Active: 1974-1977; 1990-1992
- Country: United States
- Branch: Army
- Type: Command
- Role: Signal
- Garrison/HQ: Fort Shafter, Hawaii; Fort Huachuca, Arizona
- Motto: Voice of the Desert
- Decorations: Meritorious Unit Commendation

Commanders
- Notable commanders: MG Charles Gordies Sutten, Jr.

Insignia
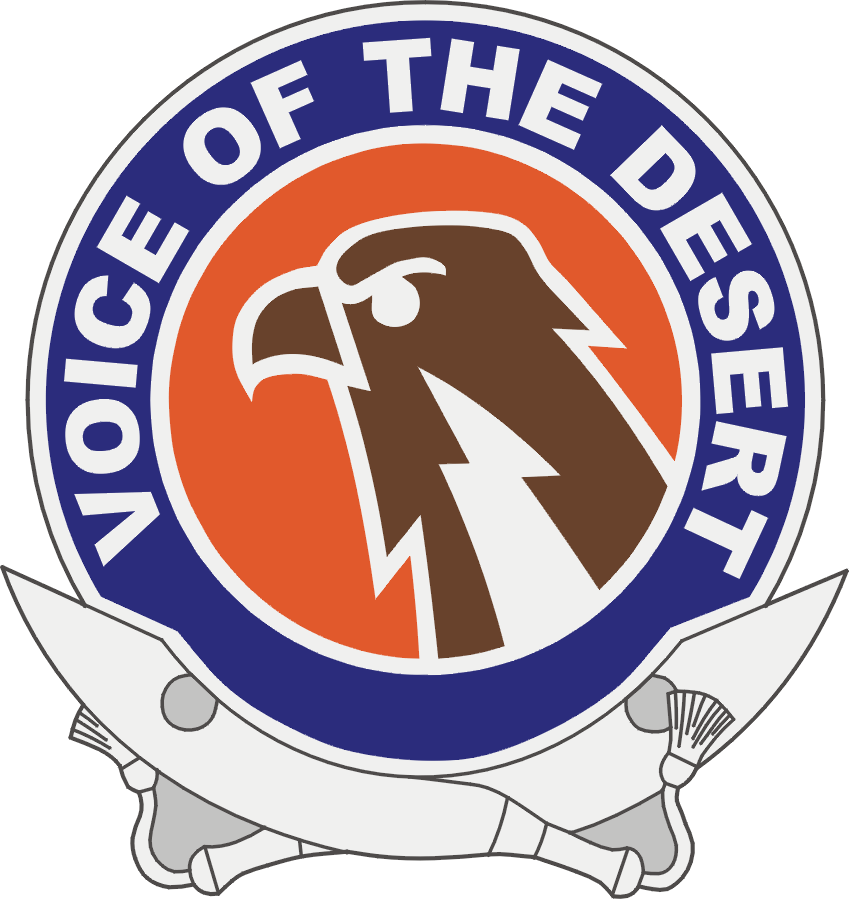
- 6th Signal Command DUI

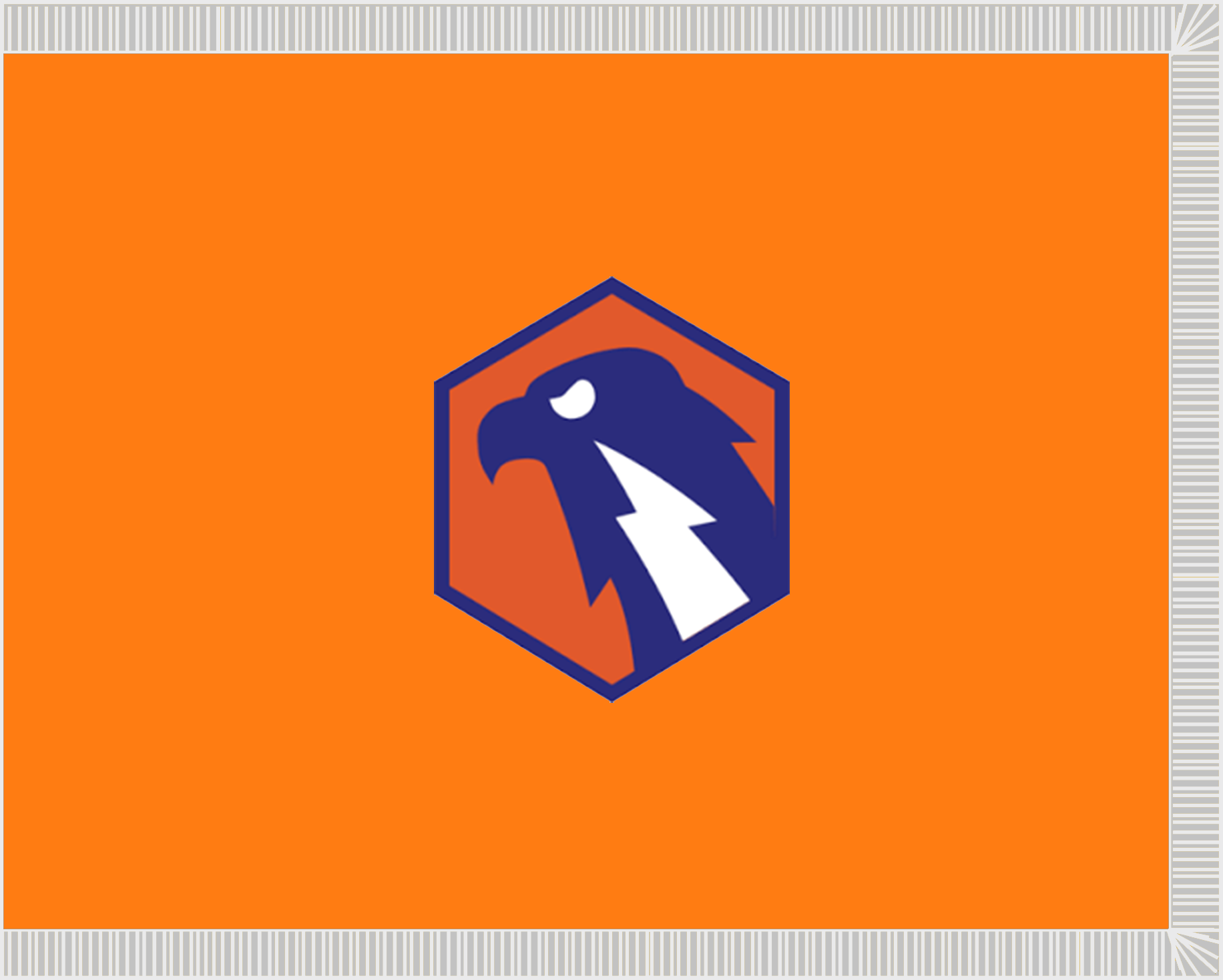
- 6th Signal Command Flag

The 6th Signal Command was a unit of the US Army activated in 1974 at Fort Shafter, Hawaii. This mission to provide communications to US Army units in the Pacific was short lived and ended in 1977.

The unit was reactivated in 1990 at Fort Huachuca, Arizona to provide communications for Operations Desert Shield and Desert Storm. The unit participated in the Defense of Saudi Arabia, Liberation and Defense of Kuwait and the Cease-Fire campaigns earning a Meritorious Unit Commendation under the command of Major General Charles G. Sutten, Jr. After the campaign was ended in 1992, the unit was deactivated once again.
