= Rocco Pranno =

Rocco Salvatore Pranno (December 18, 1916 – July 1979) was an American mobster and member of the Chicago Outfit who operated on the city's West Side.

Born in Stone Park, Illinois, Pranno's criminal record stretched back to 1934 and included charges of armed robbery, extortion, murder and bombing. Pranno served one year in prison for assault and battery, at the Joliet Prison, in Joliet, Illinois. He was later convicted of conspiracy and extortion and sentenced to 15-years imprisonment in Leavenworth Federal Penitentiary, in Leavenworth, Kansas.

The pace of development then picked up, with more than half of the area's housing stock constructed during the 1950s. Its size and poverty also made Stone Park vulnerable to organized crime, for which it became notorious. Local lore suggests that Al Capone ran a brewery here during Prohibition, while the hometown boy and gangland criminal Rocco Pranno made Stone Park his base in the 1960s. For a time Pranno's brother controlled all political offices in the town, while Pranno himself ran a crime syndicate from his office table at the Club D'Or on North Mannheim Road. Since the 1960s, Stone Park has transcended its gangland image.

In 2022, Rocco Pranno's grandniece released the novel, The Lemon Tree Girl (Sabrina Austen Scott, author). Told from the viewpoint of a younger sister, the book contains fictionalized accounts of events in Pranno's life including the Kiddieland heist and racketeering operations.
