= Wisconsin/Randolph station =

Former Chicago "L" station

WISCONSIN/RANDOLPH 1100W 300S

General information
- Location: Wisconsin Avenue and Randolph Street; Oak Park, Illinois, US
- Coordinates: 41.883256°N 87.802430°W
- System: Former Chicago 'L' rapid transit station
- Owner: Lake Street Elevated
- Line: Randolph Street branch
- Platforms: 1 side platform
- Tracks: 2

History
- Opened: May 14, 1899
- Closed: December 21, 1903
- Former names: Harlem (CTT RR)

Former services
Preceding station	Chicago Terminal Transfer Railroad	Following station
Conway Park toward Cemetaries	Chicago & Northern Pacific – Harlem Division	Oak Park/Randolph toward Chicago
Preceding station	Chicago "L"	Following station
Terminus	Randolph Street branch	Oak Park/Randolph toward Lombard
Location

Wisconsin/Randolph was a rapid transit station on the Chicago "L" between 1899 and 1903 in Oak Park, Illinois. It was the western terminus of the Randolph Street branch operated by the Lake Street Elevated Railroad.

== History ==
Before rapid transit service, conventional steam-hauled passenger trains operated in the median of Randolph Street by the Suburban Railroad to Grand Central Station. The Lake Street Elevated reached an agreement with the Suburban Railroad for trackage rights between Wisconsin Avenue and Lombard Avenue, where 'L' trains would turn north to reach the Lake Street branch (now the Green Line) for service to the Loop. When 'L' service began the morning of Monday May 14, 1899 it was met with a positive reception as riders could now reach downtown for only a nickel. Trips from Randolph to the Loop were between 38 and 45 minutes.

In 1902 the Suburban Railroad entered receivership, and their track lease from the Chicago Terminal Transfer was cancelled. This annulled the agreement to operate 'L' trains on the branch, and both companies ceased service on December 21, 1903. The next day the Suburban briefly operated a free streetcar shuttle between Wisconsin and the Lombard 'L' station until December 24. The village of Oak Park officially ordered the removal of all stations on January 7, 1904. Wisconsin Avenue station was subsequently burned to the ground by vandals.

== Design ==
Rapid transit stations along Randolph Street were converted from existing Suburban Railroad stations. Stations were simple wood frame depots and were adapted for 'L' service with high-level platforms and extended canopies. Wisconsin Avenue station was unusual as it only had one platform, located adjacent to the eastbound (north) track.

== Works cited ==
- Moffat, Bruce G. (1995). The "L": The Development of Chicago's Rapid Transit System, 1888–1932. Chicago: Central Electric Railfans' Association. ISBN 0-915348-30-6.
