= Proviso Township High Schools District 209 =

High school district in Cook County, Illinois, US

Location
- 8601 W. Roosevelt Road; Forest Park, Illinois

District information
- Type: public secondary district
- Established: 1910

Other information
- Website: www.pths209.org

Proviso Township High Schools District 209, established in 1910, is located in western Cook County, Illinois, US, near Chicago. Its headquarters are in Forest Park. The district encompasses most of Proviso Township, excluding the extreme southern portion. The district's motto is the Latin Nihil Nisi Optimum, which translates to Nothing But The Best.

The district serves Bellwood, Berkeley, Broadview, Forest Park, Hillside, Maywood, Northlake, Melrose Park, Stone Park, and Westchester.

== History ==
CBS New has reported: On that bill of Proviso Township High School District 209 Supt. Dr. James Henderson's are: • An event described as "adults only" and BYOB costing $4,200. • An extra $10,000 to his salary. • $14,000 in payments made to companies owned by Henderson's relatives; • A credit card used without authorization onto which $12,000 were charged.

The Mississippi state auditor is coming to collect that cash – calling for Henderson to pay almost $91,000 in mismanaged money. Supt. Henderson was issued a demand letter. Sources close to the school board say they worry the superintendent's spending history will repeat itself here. They point to issues already with the superintendent – including a three-week-long teachers' strike and a public spat with another school board member.

== Schools ==
The district operates three campuses.

- Proviso East High School in Maywood opened in 1911. The school was originally named Proviso Township High School, but was renamed Proviso East in 1958 with the opening of its sister school.
- Proviso West High School in Hillside opened in 1958. The school was designed by the noted Chicago architectural firm of Perkins and Will.
- The Proviso Mathematics and Science Academy in Forest Park opened in 2005. Its campus is also the home of the district administration offices.

== Performance ==
On the Prairie State Achievement Examination, 22.5% of students met or exceeded standards for academic year 2008–09. The state average was 53%. Proviso Township High Schools ranked 26th of 27 high school districts serving suburban Cook County.

== Noted alumni ==
The district's alumni include ten current or former NBA players who have collectively won three NBA Championships, an Olympic track medalist, four current or former NFL players (one of whom is in the Pro Football Hall of Fame), and two astronauts, one of whom, Gene Cernan, was the last man to walk on the Moon.
