= Kevin Bellie =

American director and choreographer

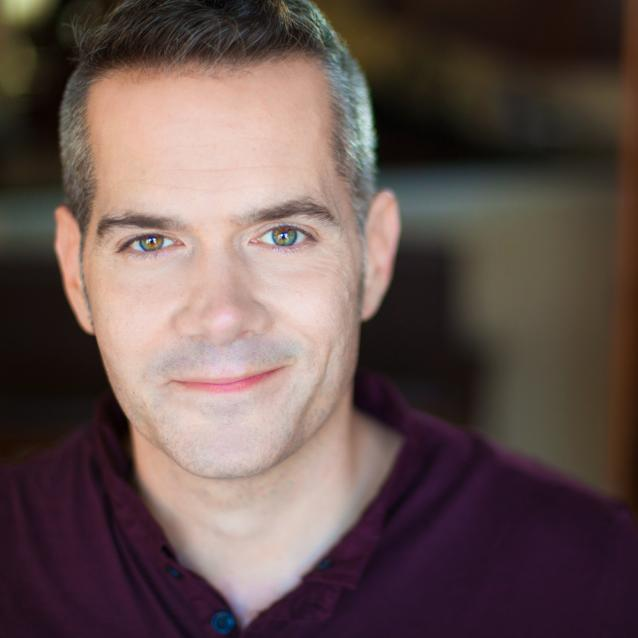
Kevin Bellie

Kevin Bellie (born May 8, 1971) is an American director and choreographer based in the Chicago, Illinois area. Bellie has been nominated for 20 Joseph Jefferson Awards and is a five-time award winner. Bellie was artistic director for Circle Theatre Chicago in Forest Park from 2003–2012 before stepping down to pursue freelance work.

== Biography ==
Besides working as a freelance director/choreographer, Bellie is a teacher of the fine arts and the registrar for St. Ignatius College Preparatory High School in Chicago.

Bellie had been a company member for 16 years at Circle Theatre before becoming artistic director for nine years (2003-2012). During his tenure as artistic director, Circle Theatre hosted visits from many notable entertainers (including Rupert Holmes, Michael John LaChiusa, Marvin Hamlisch, Russell Crowe), mounted world and Chicago premieres and built a thriving subscriber base. Bellie's direction and choreography credits at Circle Theatre included The Baker’s Wife, Urinetown (JEFF Nominated), Best Little Whorehouse in Texas (JEFF Nominated), Gentlemen Prefer Blondes (JEFF Nominated), Can-Can (JEFF Nominated), Seven Brides for Seven Brothers (JEFF Nominated), Mack & Mabel (JEFF nominated), Sweet Smell of Success (JEFF Nominated), The Mystery of Edwin Drood (JEFF Nominated), Hello Again (JEFF Recommended), Nine (JEFF Award Recipient), Triumph of Love (JEFF Nominated), The Life (JEFF Award Recipient), and Grand Hotel (JEFF Award Recipient). Also at Circle Theatre, Bellie choreographed Tommy (JEFF Nominated), Meet Me in St. Louis (JEFF nominated), She Loves Me, and The Secret Garden (JEFF Award Recipient). Bellie has designed projections/visuals for Tommy (JEFF Nominated) and When the Rain Stops Falling (JEFF Award Recipient).

Other theatrical credits include direction and choreography for Light Opera Works in Evanston, Illinois (Damn Yankees) and for Fox Valley Repertory (formerly Noble Fool Theatricals) at the Pheasant Run Resort (Let’s Misbehave, Breaking Up is Hard To Do, The 25th Annual Putnam County Spelling Bee, The Mystery of Edwin Drood and The Taffetas); McLeod Summer Playhouse's A Chorus Line; choreography for Porchlight's Gypsy, and McLeod Summer Playhouse's The Producers.

In January 2013, Bellie was nominated for an equity Joseph Jefferson Award for Outstanding Director-Revue for his production of A Grand Night for Singing at The Mercury Theatre Chicago

== Other awards ==
Bellie has also won Joseph Jefferson Awards for Costume Design and for Projection Design.
