= Urban Accents =

American food company

- Industry: Specialty Food
- Founder: Tom Knibbs and Jim Dygas
- Headquarters: Chicago, IL, USA
- Area served: Throughout USA
- Key people: Tom Knibbs - President & Mixmaster; Jim Dygas - Chief Creative and Flavorista
- Products: spice blends, grilling rubs, seasoned sea salts, creative pancake mixes
- Owner: Tom Knibbs and Jim Dygas
- Website: www.urbanaccents.com

Urban Accents is a specialty food company based in Chicago, Illinois that manufactures and distributes spice blends, grilling rubs, sea salts and a full collection of products designed for use in gourmet cooking. The company's products are sold in major retail chains such as Target, Macy's, Sur La Table, Neiman Marcus and Cost Plus and local gourmet stores across North America.

== History ==
Tom Knibbs and Jim Dygas started Urban Accents in 1996, and the company has experienced double digit growth annually. In the first years of the company's existence, Urban Accents focused solely on developing spice blends. Now, they manufacture over 100 different items today and are still best known for some of their first spice blends. In the spring of 2008, the business acquired a new 40,000-square-foot (3,700 m^{2}) warehouse and office space in the Ravenswood neighborhood in Chicago.

== Spice blends ==
The company began with 24 spice basics and blends, the majority of which are still sold today. Now, the company manufactures 42 different spice blends and divides them among five flavor families: American Adventures, Pan Asian, Old World Classics, Latin Heat and Global Exotics. They also use these flavor families to categorize other products.

== Dryglaze ==
In early 2007, the company released a new type of seasoning called Dryglaze, which combines savory spices and natural sweetening agents like honey, molasses and vanilla sugar to form a glaze on baked or grilled meat dishes. This new creation received attention at the July Fancy Food Show in New York. The Philadelphia Inquirer mentioned two types of these Dryglazes in its review of the show. The following year, the company was voted into the Top 10 Summer Grilling Essentials by the Chicago Tribune's free daily newspaper, Red Eye. The company was also featured in the April issue of Fancy Food Magazine for their Athenian Herb Dryglaze.

The company sells seven types of Dryglazes: Athenian Herb, Santa Fe BBQ, Bombay Blitz, Cayman Citrus, Puebla Mole Mole (sauce), Vermont Grill and Pan Asian Zing.

== Drink mixes ==
Knibbs and Dygas have expanded the focus of Urban Accents to include a collection of drink mixes and lemonade mixes. The company sells six cocktail mixes: Spicy Bloody Mary, Minty-Lime Mojito, Mixed Fruit Sangria, Key Lime Margarita, Triple Berry Cosmo and Creme Brule Chocotini. Their lemonade mixes include traditional fruit flavorings and unexpected flavor pairings: Black Cherry, Tropical Key Lime, Strawberry, Tangerine, Raspberry, Jalapeño, Cucumber, Ginger, Lavender and Spiced.

== Holiday products ==
In recent years, the company has focused on developing products for the holidays. The majority of their holiday products are designed for Thanksgiving and Christmas. There are four instant powdered drink mixes for spiced cocoa, hot buttered rum, mulling spice and eggnog. The company also makes meat rubs for turkey, ham and lamb, and its turkey brine received favorable reviews from The Washington Post's commuter newspaper, Express.

In 2008, the company introduced a line of side dish seasonings for Thanksgiving that includes spice blends for gravy, cranberry dishes, yams and stuffing. Also included in its new items for the holiday season are two chocolate martini mixes.

== Design ==
The company's packaging and design received recognition in Package Design Magazine in 2008. It was a finalist for Product Line of the Year in 1996 by the National Association of Special Food Trade.

They are well known in the specialty food world for product design innovation.

== See also ==
- Food manufacturers of Chicago
