= Leonard W. Hein =

American economist

Leonard William Hein (February 17, 1916 – 4 September 2000) was an American economist, accountant, and academic. He served as professor of accounting at the Los Angeles State College, and was known for his work on the history of accountancy and the development of contemporary accounting thought.

== Life and work ==
Hein was born in Forest Park, Illinois to Harry Christian and Clara A. (Klein) Hein. He received his BSc magna cum laude at the Loyola University Chicago in 1952, and his PhD at the University of California, Los Angeles in 1954 with the thesis entitled "The Impact of the British Companies Acts Upon the Major Areas of the Practice of Accountancy in the British Isles." In 1955 he obtained his Certified Public Accountant certificate in the state of Illinois.

Hein started his academic career as instructor at the DePaul University. He jointed the Los Angeles State College, now California State University, Los Angeles, in 1956. There he was promoted assistant professor of accounting in 1957, associate professor of business administration in 1959, and professor of accounting in the 1960s, which he stayed until his retirement in 1983.

Hein came into prominence with the 1959 publication of "J. Lee Nicholson: pioneer cost accountant" in the Accounting Review. In the next two decades Hein published four books on the development of contemporary accounting thought, electronic data processing, and the use of computers. He died in September 2000 at the age of 84.

== Selected publications ==
- Hein, Leonard W. The Impact of the British Companies Acts Upon the Major Areas of the Practice of Accountancy in the British Isles. PhD thesis, Los Angeles State College.
- Hein, Leonard W. An introduction to electronic data processing for business. Van Nostrand, 1961.
- Hein, Leonard W. The quantitative approach to managerial decisions. Prentice-Hall, 1967.
- Leonard W. Hein. Contemporary accounting and the computer. Belmont, Calif., Dickenson Pub. Co., 1969.
- Hein, Leonard W. The British Companies Acts and the Practice of Accountancy, 1844-1962. New York: Arno Press, 1978.

Articles, a selection:

- Hein, Leonard W. "J. Lee Nicholson: pioneer cost accountant." Accounting Review (1959): 106–111.
- Hein, Leonard W. "British Business Company: Its Origins and Its Control, The." U. Toronto LJ 15 (1963): 134.
- Hein, Leonard W. "The Course in Computers-Is It Accounting? Mathematics? Engineering?." Accounting Review (1959): 132–134.
- Hein, Leonard W. "The Auditor and the British Companies Acts." Accounting Review (1963): 508–520.
