= Harlem Race Track =

Racing track in the Village of Harlem, Illinois

Coordinates: 41°51′40″N 87°48′42″W

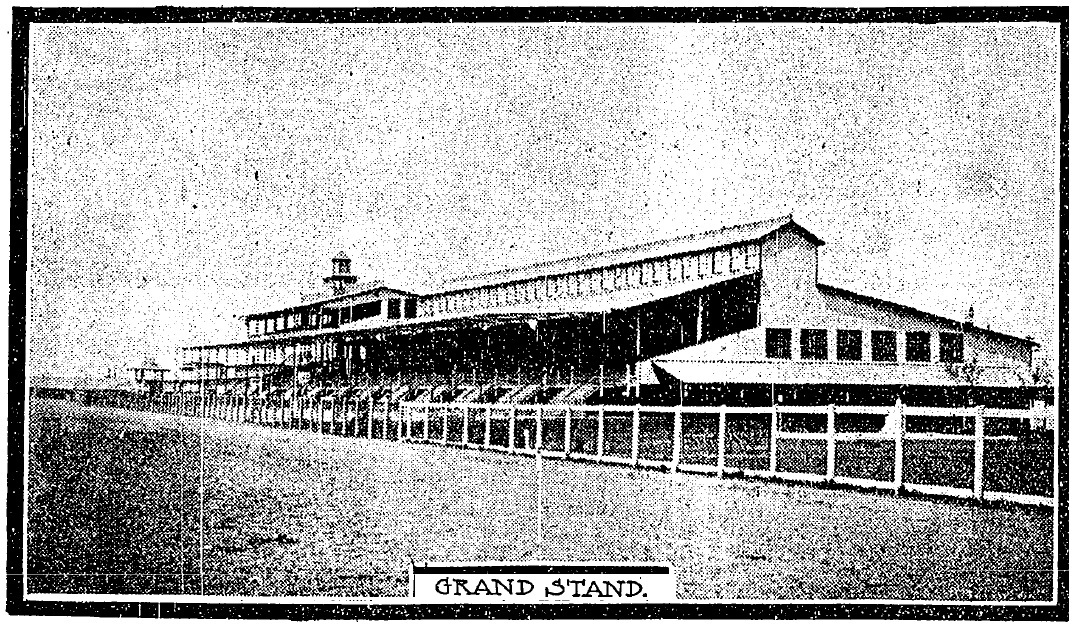
Harlem Race Track Grandstand, 1901

The Harlem Race Track, managed by the Harlem Jockey Club, was a horse racing track located in the Village of Harlem, Illinois (currently Forest Park, Illinois) between Collier Avenue (currently 16th Street) and 12th St. (currently Roosevelt Road), and between W. 74th (currently Hannah Avenue) and W 76th (currently Lathrop Avenue).

The track was built by a syndicate led by George Hankins in 1894, and it was scheduled to open for the 1895 horse racing season. Because there was a public outcry against all gambling, the track did not open as scheduled, and it lay dormant at great expense to the investors. On July 3, 1897, the track was sold by the Chicago Fair Grounds Association, by President William Martin, to attorney William H. Allen for $150,000. Allen leased the 80 acre property to James Anglin who appointed John Condon general manager, and Martin Nathanson as secretary. The lease eventually went to Condon, but he decided to discontinue his association with the track when his lease expired on February 1, 1899. Despite Condon's retirement, it was speculated that he remained in control of Harlem, and the course secretary, Martin Nathanson, announced that the 1899 racing program would begin on May 30. A fire at the track on May 22, 1899, believed to be caused by "incendiaries," destroyed the grandstand and fencing. A temporary grandstand was quickly built so that racing season could still open on time, and construction of a new permanent grandstand of steel and stone was planned.

In early May 1900 John Condon appears to have gained complete control of the Harlem race track, despite his earlier announcement of his retirement from the business. This enabled Condon to become sole owner of the track by purchasing it outright from lawyer P. J. Ryan for $180,000. The lightning from an intense rainstorm killed a horse in the stables at the track, knocked the stable boy attending the horse unconscious for an hour, and also shocked Condon and track official William Miers.

From 1899 to 1904 the Lake Street Elevated Railroad offered express excursion service to the track via the Cuyler Avenue Shuttle.

As of 2021, the area which the horsetrack was on is now occupied by the Chicago Bulk Mail Center and the eastern part of the Forest Park Plaza.

== Thoroughbred races ==
Races:

- Aspirant Stakes
- Combination Selling Stakes
- Fort Dearborn Stakes
- Graduate Stakes
- Harlem Stakes
- LaGrange Selling Stakes
- Petite Stakes
- Prairie State Selling Stakes
- Proviso Stakes
- Riverside Stakes
- Senior Stakes
- September Handicap
- Speed Stakes

== Automobile racing ==
The track was used by the Chicago Automobile Club to hold a three-day program of auto races from May 28 to May 30, 1905. A year later, when the Western Automobile Racing Association visited the track at the end of June 1906, "... it was found that the building had been dismantled, the water supply cut off and the track so washed that it would be impossible to get it in suitable shape in time [for the automobile races]." Consequently, the association had to move their scheduled meet for July 3 and 4, 1906 to the Hawthorne Race Course. On July 12 and 13, 1907 the Harlem track was used to hold a 24-hour automobile race along with several minor races on each day. The race was listed on the daily schedule of the Glidden Tour that year, but tour participants were not required to enter the competition. Another series of auto races took place on October 12, 1907, after several postponements because of poor weather.

A nine-hole golf course was being constructed on the infield of the race track grounds in April 1901. The course was in use by June 1901. By November 1914 a second course had been laid out on the property.

=== Other uses ===
An experimental airship station was opened at the Harlem Race Track on June 5, 1909, by the Chicago Aeronautic Association. The association was the local branch of the Aero Club of Illinois.

A fire at the track on November 24, 1910, Thanksgiving Day, destroyed 400 horse stables, approximately a half mile in length, along with half a dozen cottages and a house on the property.
