= Howard R. Mohr =

American politician and businessman

Member of the Illinois Senate
- In office 1967–1977

Personal details
- Born: December 20, 1921 Forest Park, Illinois, U.S.
- Died: January 12, 1977 (aged 55) Springfield, Illinois, U.S.
- Party: Republican
- Occupation: Politician, businessman

Military service
- Allegiance: United States
- Branch/service: United States Navy
- Battles/wars: World War II

Howard R. Mohr (December 20, 1921 – January 12, 1977) was an American politician and businessman.

Mohr was born in Forest Park, Illinois. he graduated from the Proviso-Townsend High School in 1940. Mohr served in the United States Navy during World War II. He was the owner of the Mohn Oil Company and was involved in the fuel oil and equipment business. Mohr served as Mayor of Forest Park and was a Republican. Mohr served in the Illinois Senate from 1967 until 1977. Mohr died in Springfield, Illinois after becoming ill at a retirement breakfast. Mohr did not seek re-election in 1976.
