= Hillside School District 93 =

School district in Illinois, United States

Address
- 4804 Harrison Street Hillside, Illinois, 60162; United States

District information
- Type: Public
- Grades: PreK–8
- NCES District ID: 1719230

Students and staff
- Students: 455

Other information
- Website: www.hillside93.org

Hillside School District 93 is a school district headquartered in Hillside, Illinois in the Chicago metropolitan area. It operates one K-8 school, Hillside School. In addition to most of Hillside it also serves sections of Berkeley, Elmhurst, and Westchester.

As of 1960 the school is next door to the Hillside village hall. The district has an intergovernmental agreement with the Hillside Police Department.

== History ==
It was established in 1918.

Prior to April 1950, it had a school board with three persons. That year the number of board members increased to five since the population of the district had increased.

Circa 1945 the school had around 92-93 students. In 1949 the school had 185 students; that year the school added a $165,000 wing with two classrooms, a 500-seat gymnasium, a heating plant, and an administration office. The yellow-brick structure, which included one story and a basement and had the capability to be expanded, was designed by Arthur E. Swanson & Associates architects and built by Powers Construction. The total number of classrooms in the school structure was six. By 1950 it already had 230 students, so another school bond for an addition of four classrooms was proposed that year. In 1950 the student count in half of the classes was 45 or greater. This second addition was built in 1951. In 1952 there were 320 students. Voters approved of the construction of a $100,000, four classroom wing in April 1953. It was scheduled to open on September 15, 1953. In 1958 390 voters approved a renovation of the existing structure and a $390,000 school addition, while 135 voted against it. In 1960 the Hillside School had 590 students. The Hillside School had 661 students in 1965. and in 1968 that figure was to at 964, close to the school's 700 student limit. That year an inspection by the Illinois Office of the Superintendent of Public Inspection stated that the cafeteria, library, and shower facilities were not sufficient for its student body. In 1971 439 voters rejected a $1,635,000 bond for school equipment as well as additions and renovations of the Hillside School, while 323 voted in favor.

In 1968 the school district proposed a bond for a $975,000 grade 6-8 junior high school campus to relieve the Hillside School. For this purpose, the school district bought a 12.5-acre (5.1 ha) parcel of land in Westchester. The vote was scheduled for March 16, 1968. The plan for the new building was canceled after the voters rejected the referendum. The president of Concord Homes, Roger Mankedick, stated in a Chicago Sun-Times stated that the student population that was supposed to surround the school never came. The Chicago Tribune stated there was a decline in students in the area surrounding the school site. In 1998 the district instead sold the land to Concord Homes for $2.6 million. By 1999 the school district instead built another addition to the Hillside School, funded by the sale of the Westchester land.

In 2012 the district had 485 students. That year and in 2011 the district bought projectors and cameras for its classrooms.

In 2015 Kevin Suchinski was hired as the superintendent.

== Service area ==
In addition to most of Hillside, the district also serves sections of Berkeley, Elmhurst, and Westchester. In 1953 the Cook County portion of Elmhurst, then called Yorkfield, had 45 houses. It also serves a community called West Dale Gardens, which was an unincorporated area in 1953. At the time it had 110 houses.

== Operations ==
In 1971 the school instituted a mental health program affiliated with Northeastern Illinois University. This program used a graduate student in social therapy to work in the school's drug control program, to assist 7th and 8th grade students about to transition to high school, and to assist children with emotional disturbances. This student was interning at the Forrest Hospital in Des Plaines, Illinois. The student used videotapes of classrooms sessions in order to control the behavior of the disturbed children. It was the first program of its type in the area.

== Feeder patterns ==
Students move on to Proviso West High School.

== See also ==
- Non-high school district
