= Randolph Street Branch and Cuyler Avenue Shuttle =

Former rapid transit line in Chicago

Randolph Street Branch Cuyler Avenue Shuttle

Overview
- Status: Demolished
- Locale: Oak Park, Illinois, United States; Forest Park, Illinois
- Termini: Wisconsin (Randolph) Harlem Race Track (Cuyler); Lombard
- Stations: 5 (1899–1904); 3 (1911–1912)

Service
- Type: Rapid transit
- System: Chicago "L"
- Operator(s): Chicago and Oak Park Elevated Railroad (1904–1912); Lake Street Elevated Railroad Company (1899–1904)

History
- Opened: 1899
- Closed: 1903 (Randolph); 1912 (Cuyler)

Technical
- Character: At-grade
- Track gauge: 4 ft 8 1/2 in (1,435 mm)
- Electrification: Overhead line, 600 V DC
Route map
The Lake Street Elevated, and South Boulevard extension in green, Randolph Street branch in gray

The Randolph Street Branch and Cuyler Avenue Shuttle were two different incarnations of a rapid transit line operated in and around Oak Park, Illinois, a suburb of Chicago, by the Lake Street Elevated intermittently between 1899 and 1912. The Randolph Street Branch served as the line's westward extension to Wisconsin Avenue from Lombard Avenue, whereas the Cuyler Avenue Shuttle was intended to serve the Harlem Race Track. Local opposition resulted in the lines being discontinued.

== Background and franchise (1888–1899) ==
Chicago's explosive growth in the 19th century necessitated the construction of rapid transit in its borders. Several companies were chartered for the purpose, of which four ultimately built what would become the Chicago "L". One of these was the Lake Street Elevated, a company that was chartered in 1888 and first began service on November 6, 1893, between California Avenue and the Market Street Terminal. By April 1894, the Elevated had expanded west to 52nd Avenue, the western edge of the Chicago city limits. In December 1893, it attempted to cross what was then Cicero Township to 72nd Avenue (now Harlem Avenue), but was unable to get approval from the Township.

Further negotiations between the Township and the railroad bore fruit on December 20, 1898, when the railroad was granted a franchise to extend its line straight through to 72nd Avenue as well as the possibility to build a connection to the Suburban Railroad's Randolph Street trackage to Wisconsin Avenue, as well as to build tracks south from Randolph on Cuyler Avenue to connect to the Suburban's Harrison Street line.

== Branch and local disputes (1899–1904) ==
The extension through South Boulevard began construction by the Cicero & Harlem in the middle of July 1900; work had to finish by December 15 to prevent its franchise from lapsing. The company started to seek permission to construct tracks on Harlem to form a loop with the Randolph Street branch, but this was strongly opposed and the plans dropped. In early December, the Town's Board of Trustees reviewed the construction's progress and ordered the Cicero & Harlem to lower the track so that the Town could construct improvements on the street. The company refused as most of the track had already been laid, causing the Town to order stoppage of work; the Cicero & Harlem then acquiesced to both lower the tracks and pave South Boulevard. The Town allowed work to continue, extending the deadline to February 1.

The South Boulevard extension opened sometime during the week preceding Friday, January 25, 1901. (Note: The sole press comment on the line's opening was a single-sentence notice from the weekly-published Oak Park Reporter on that date.) The C&OP then discontinued service on Randolph Street, but the Suburban continued to run streetcars to satisfy franchise requirements. Express service finally came to local residents of Oak Park on August 8, 1902; morning express trains to the Loop left the South Boulevard extension's Wisconsin station in ten-minute intervals between 6:15 and 8:35 a.m., and departed the Loop every six minutes between 4:35 and 6:20 p.m. No morning expresses departed the Randolph branch, but two evening trains did serve it.

By this time, the Randolph branch east of Lombard was abandoned except for the Suburban's occasional streetcar, so 14 railcars that had been stored in the Lake Street's central track were moved to that area during mid-day hours. This displeased residents, and the Village ordered the cars' removal in early September; Clarence Knight countered that the lack of storage capacity would mean that reverting to use of the center would mean the discontinuation of express service. The village persisted and directed the company to stop storing cars on Randolph by November 1; although originally lenient in enforcing this, it became apparent that the Lake Street was sluggish in the process of relocation, resulting in the village ordering the cars' removal. This led to the discontinuation of express service starting Monday, November 10; passengers abandoned the "L" in favor of the nearby Chicago & North Western (C&NW), causing such a drop in revenue that Knight had to temporarily store cars in Chicago while extending the center track to hold the excess. Express service resumed on November 12.

The Suburban Railroad entered receivership in July 1902; it in any event had only leasing rights on the tracks, which were owned by the Chicago Terminal Transfer (CTT). The Suburban's receiver revoked the leasing agreement between the railroad and the CTT, which also affected the Lake Street Elevated's use of those tracks. The CTT's own rights to occupy Randolph Street was called into question and found in November 1903 by the Illinois Supreme Court to have expired on July 1, 1901. This, combined with increasing opposition by residents and losses of $40 ($1,200 in 2021) a day, led to the branch's abandonment by the Elevated on December 21, 1903.

The Suburban compensated for this loss by providing a free streetcar shuttle on what had been the Randolph Street branch starting December 22, 1903. This shuttle ran from Wisconsin Avenue to the Lombard station; eastbound trains stopped short of the Lombard station so passengers could pay fare to the "L"'s ticket agent, while the car would then pull into the station for passengers to board for the westbound trip. This shuttle used the same car and crew as a recently discontinued shuttle service by the Suburban from Wisconsin to Conway Park, a service that would be restored on December 23. It was strongly suspected that the C&OP (the successor to the Lake Street) was sponsoring this shuttle in secret to preserve its rights on Randolph Street.

The Randolph Shuttle only lasted through December 24, however. The shuttle was closed on December 25 for Christmas; Allen S. Ray, the Oak Park village president, maintained that the franchise had thus been forfeit due to non-operation and police tore up the tracks connecting the line to the Elevated on early December 26.

== Abandonment (1904–1909) ==
After the Christmas incident, Oak Park formally ordered the demolition of the Randolph Street branch on January 7, 1904; vandals destroyed the station at Wisconsin, and the remainder was demolished, except for the section east of Cuyler maintaining the connection between the Shuttle and main line. Some stations were reused in private property; one survived as late as 1995 as a garage.

Knight was aware that the C&OP was only occupying the surviving sections of Randolph Street trackage by the good graces of the village and CTT, and requested the village to build a loop on Cuyler to alleviate congestion at Austin Avenue and to abandon tracks at Randolph and Lombard; a long-awaited "L" stop at East Avenue would be included as part of the deal. The village also wanted the C&OP to pave Cuyler Avenue, a request Knight balked at. The remaining Randolph street trackage was removed on July 9, 1905, splitting the Cuyler shuttle into two parts, although the shuttle had been discontinued on July 3.

The Harlem Race Track closed in 1904, and the Shuttle closed in June of that year.

== Cuyler Avenue Shuttle and demise (1909 – 1912) ==
The Shuttle was resurrected in 1909.

== Works cited ==
- Moffat, Bruce G. (1995). The "L": The Development of Chicago's Rapid Transit System, 1888–1932. Chicago: Central Electric Railfans' Association. ISBN 0-915348-30-6.
