= Fuhrman and Forster Company =

The Fuhrman and Forster Company was a meatpacking and sausage manufacturing company located in Chicago.

It was founded by three German immigrants from Bavaria. John and Andrew Fuhrman started the Fuhrman Brothers meat market at 408 W. Harrison in Chicago in 1897 and invited brother-in-law George Forster to join them in 1898 creating Fuhrman Bros. and Forster Meat Markets. The name was soon changed to the Fuhrman and Forster Co. By 1902, they operated 5 meat markets in the Pilsen neighborhood area of Chicago. This neighborhood was largely populated by Czech and Slovak immigrants who were very fond of Fuhrman and Forster products.

Their lard was very popular with women for baking. The company's horse-drawn delivery wagons were a common sight in the neighborhood as they delivered Fuhrman and Forster Co. products to many of the local butcher shops as well as their own stores. The horses were kept in stables behind one of the stores located at 1748 West 21st Place. By 1919, the wagons and horses were replaced by motor trucks which at one time numbered 75. The company was incorporated in 1920 and closed all retail outlets in 1923 to concentrate on pork packing and sausage manufacturing. By the 1940s the yellow and blue trucks were delivering product to customers on Chicago's west side and suburbs such as Berywn, Cicero and Riverside. Several different types of delivery trucks were used over the years with the most popular being manufactured by International and GMC. The company owned and operated their own fleet except for a few years in the late 1930s when the fleet was owned and operated by Hertz Corp. and leased back by the Fuhrman and Forster Co. The truck fleet was housed in a garage at 1647-1655 Blue Island Avenue, one block north of the main plant. There was a time when Fuhrman and Forster Company products were more popular on Chicago's south and west sides than ones from the Oscar Mayer Co. Like most companies, the Fuhrman and Forster Company fell on hard times during the Great Depression. It was a particularly hard hit when the firm had to deal with the deaths of co-founders Andrew Fuhrman in 1930 and John Fuhrman in 1931. But sales were sufficient to keep the business going (everyone still had to eat) and with World War II came a temporary end to hard times. Gross sales approached $4.0 million a year. The company celebrated its 50th anniversary in 1947 and was featured in an article in the November 1st issue of the National Provisioner Magazine that year. However, depressed meat prices in the early 1950s proved too much to handle and the Fuhrman and Forster Company was closed in May 1955. An auction was held in September of that year to sell off the remaining assets with the funds distributed to the shareholders. "Select Brand" was the name under which many Fuhrman and Forster Co. products were marketed. They also manufactured house brands, the most popular was "Hilbran" marketed by the now closed Hillman's Grocery Stores in Chicago. At the time the Fuhrman and Forster Company was closed, Arthur Forster was President and Lawrence Forster was Secretary. Both were sons of co-founder George Forster. Herbert Krueger, son-in-law of co-founder John Fuhrman, was Treasurer.

The main building at 1839-1855 Blue Island Ave. is gone now but the garage and a cold storage building at 1846 Loomis St. are still standing and in good condition. Part of the main building is still there at 1847 S. Blue Island.

== External reference ==
For more information and photographs see
