= Vanee Foods =

American food company

Vanee Foods Company, Inc.
- Company type: Private, Family Owned
- Industry: Food Processing & Manufacturing
- Founded: February 1, 1950
- Headquarters: Oak Brook, IL, United States
- Products: Gravy, Sauces, Soups, Entrees, Flavor Bases
- Number of employees: 350 (2022)
- Website: www.vaneefoodscompany.com

Vanee Foods Company, Inc., is a manufacturer of a variety of food products, from canned entrees and gravies to dry mixes and soup bases.The company's products are marketed primarily through the foodservice and club store channels. Vanee Foods also manufactures custom formulations for national and regional chain restaurants, and is a co-packer for several major food companies. Founded by Joseph and Adriana VanEekeren in 1950 in downtown Chicago, Vanee Foods is still family owned and operated. Today, there are ten family members involved in the day-to-day management of the company.

Vanee Foods was involved in a minor recall in 2014 after 3,156 pounds of turkey base was mislabeled omitting contents which included milk, a known allergen. During the 1980’s and 1990’s Vanee Foods supplied T-Rations to the United States Army during Operation Desert Shield and Operation Desert Storm.

== See also ==
- List of food companies
