= Berkeley School District 87 =

Public school district in Berkeley, Illinois, United States

Location
- 1200 North Wolf Road Berkeley, Illinois United States

District information
- Grades: PreK - 8th
- Established: 1848; 178 years ago
- Superintendent: Dr. Dan Sullivan

Students and staff
- Students: 2,462
- Teachers: 190

Other information
- Website: www.berkeley87.org

Berkeley School District 87 is a school district headquartered in Berkeley, Illinois. The school district comprises six schools.

It was established in 1848.

== Schools ==
School name	Principal	Number of Students	Lowest Grade	Highest Grade
MacArthur Middle School	Kevin Grochowski	430	6th grade	8th grade
Northlake Middle School	Sunil Mody	469	6th grade	8th grade
J W Riley Intermediate School	Maria Hendricks	456	3rd grade	5th grade
Jefferson Primary School	Paris Branton-May	392	Prekindergarten	2nd grade
Sunnyside Intermediate School	Nancy Tortora	437	3rd grade	5th grade
Whittier Primary School	Tracy Bodenstab	410	Prekindergarten	2nd grade

Information based on 2017-18 Illinois Report Cards.
