= Yellow Book USA =

Telephone directory (1930–2012)

- Formerly: Merchant Advertising Services Inc. Yellow Book; Yellowbook Inc.
- Industry: Business directory
- Founded: 1930; 96 years ago in Long Island, United States
- Defunct: May 7, 2012

Yellow Book USA was a yellow pages directory publisher. It started as a Long Island-based company, Merchant Advertising Services Inc., in 1930. In 1949, the company formally changed its name to Yellow Book. In 1996, the company formally changed its name to Yellow Book USA.

== History ==
=== 1966-2003 ===
In 1966, Post Office Telecommunications - a division of the UK General Post Office, launched the first UK Yellow Pages classified directory in Brighton, Sussex. Yellow Pages were rolled out across the UK by 1973, and became the first information provider on Prestel.

Yellow Pages launched its J. R. Hartley adverts in 1983, and became a separately identified business within the BT Group after BT was privatised in 1984. The red fronted Business Pages launched in 1985 in Bristol and South Wales, and the telephone directory enquiries information service Talking Pages was piloted in Brighton and Bristol from 1987, which then became known as 118 24 7 after 2003. The group launched Yell.com, its UK local search engine, in 1996 and acquired YellowBook USA in 1999 for $665 million.

The Group was renamed Yell in 2000 and BT restructured in 2001 and agreed to sell the Yell directory business to private equity firms Apax Partners and Hicks, Muse, Tate & Furst for £2.14 billion/$3.5 billion, making it then the largest non-corporate leveraged buyout in European history.

Yell bought McLeodUSA, one of the largest independent directory publishers in the US, for about $600 million in 2002 and floated on London's FTSE in 2003.

With the 2003 merger of McLeodUSA's business and TransWestern's presence in 25 states, Yellowbook USA, Yell's subsidiary, became the fifth largest directory publisher in the United States. TransWestern had been acquired by CIVC Partners in 1993 and was used for additional acquisitions of smaller directory publishers in the western US. In 1997, TransWestern completed a leveraged recapitalization in which Thomas H. Lee Partners and Providence Equity Partners acquired a 60% interest in the company, with CIVC retaining a minority interest. In 2001, TransWestern acquired Texas-based WorldPages.com, Inc., a print and Internet yellow pages publisher listed on the New York Stock Exchange for $215 million. At the time, TransWestern was the second-largest independent publisher of directories.

=== 2005-2012 ===
In May 2005, Yell announced the acquisition of TransWestern Publishing, a US directory publisher. The company announced the purchase of the publisher and its holding company, TransWestern Holdings L.P., from a consortium of private equity firms for $1.575 billion. The deal went through later in the year.

In April 2006, Yell agreed to purchase a 59.9% stake in Spanish phone directory firm Telefónica Publicidad e Informacion (TPI) from Telefónica, and launched a bid for the remaining shares, which valued TPI at a total of £2.3 billion. After that, Yell bought further capital and, in September 2007, reached an agreement with the minority shareholders to acquire the remaining 1.28% of what was named Yell Publicidad. In July 2006, Yell threatened Yellowikis with legal action, claiming that people would confuse the two organisations. In 2008, Yell Group purchased the Pindar Set business and renamed it Yell Adworks.

In May 2009, Yell UK announced an alliance with Google to provide search marketing services to small businesses, followed by Yell Publicidad in January 2010. In June 2009, Yell Group announced the appointment of Bob Wigley as Chairman, following the announcement in May 2009, that existing chairman Bob Scott would step down. In September 2009, Yell's US arm, Yellowbook, acquired Texas and Louisiana assets of ypOne Publishing, the 10th largest independent yellow pages publisher in the US. Yell announced the completion of its refinancing in November 2009, as first announced in June 2009 and updated in September the same year.

In February 2010, Yell UK announced the first significant redesign in forty years of the traditional Yellow Pages directories into a smaller compact size rather than the traditional A4 format.

In May 2010, Yell Group purchased TrustedPlaces, a user-contributed local review site, and its US arm Yellowbook, announced the launch of a new group buying website called Weforia.com in August 2010.

In 2011, Yellow Book USA changed its name to Yellowbook Inc.

In July 2011, Yell announced the acquisition of Znode, the privately owned multi-store ecommerce company and strategic alliances on digital services for small businesses with both Microsoft and Bazaarvoice. On 14 July, Yell announced a four-year plan to move away from traditional print and online advertising.

In September 2011, Yell announced an alliance with mobile platform company Netbiscuits.

In 2011 the company reported spending £160 million on interest payments and incurring losses of £1.4 billion.

In May 2012, Yell announced that it was changing its name to Hibu, pronounced "high-boo". The company's shareholders approved the change of name at its annual general meeting held on 27 July 2012, and the new name became effective from 30 July 2012.
