= Proviso Mathematics and Science Academy =

Location
- 8601 W. Roosevelt Road; Forest Park, Illinois 60130; United States; 41.8651°N 87.8322°W

Information
- School type: public secondary, selective enrollment
- Opened: 2005
- Status: open
- School district: Proviso Twp. HS Dist. 209
- Superintendent: Krish Mohip
- Principal: Dr. Akwaji-Anderson
- Faculty: 43.55 (FTE)
- Grades: 9–12
- Gender: coed
- Enrollment: 924 (2022–23)
- Average class size: 25.6
- Student to teacher ratio: 18.87
- Campus: Suburban
- Colours: purple black
- Slogan: "Be prompt, prepared, pay attention, be positive, and always persevere."
- Mascot: Monty the Python
- Nickname: Pythons
- Newspaper: PMSA Voice
- Yearbook: "The PMSA Years"
- Website: pmsa.pths209.org

Proviso Mathematics and Science Academy is a selective enrollment high school in Forest Park, Illinois, United States that opened to 126 freshmen in 2005. It is one of the newest schools in the Proviso Township High Schools District 209. It serves students in many towns in western Cook County including Forest Park, Berkeley, Broadview, Maywood, Melrose Park, Stone Park, Hillside, Bellwood, and Westchester among others. In May 2023, the school was named within the top ten Illinois High Schools, placing 6th in U.S. News & World Report.

== Academics and admissions ==
The academy accepts students through an admissions program including standardized tests, grades, and teacher recommendations. Proviso's curriculum is informed by that of the Illinois Mathematics and Science Academy. The curriculum focuses on science, math, technology, arts, and foreign languages. They also teach Physics First, which introduces freshmen to physics before studying chemistry and biology.

The school mascot is Monty the Python; school colors are purple and black. As there are no sports facilities at the Academy, students play sports including baseball, basketball, football, track and field, softball, volleyball at either Proviso East or Proviso West. Proviso's extra curricular activities include: Anime Club, Book Club, Comedy Improv, Chorus, Debate, Newspaper, Theater, Robotics, Student Council and Yearbook.

Much of the 5th floor at the campus houses District 209 administration offices which were formerly located at Proviso East High School.

== Beyond graduation ==
Graduates have gone on to four year colleges and universities including University of Chicago, Boston University, Cornell University, Dominican University (Illinois), Massachusetts Institute of Technology, Northwestern University, University of Illinois at Urbana–Champaign, Harvard University, Case Western Reserve University, University of Wisconsin-Madison, University of Michigan and various other prestigious institutes.
