= Hillside, Illinois =

- Village
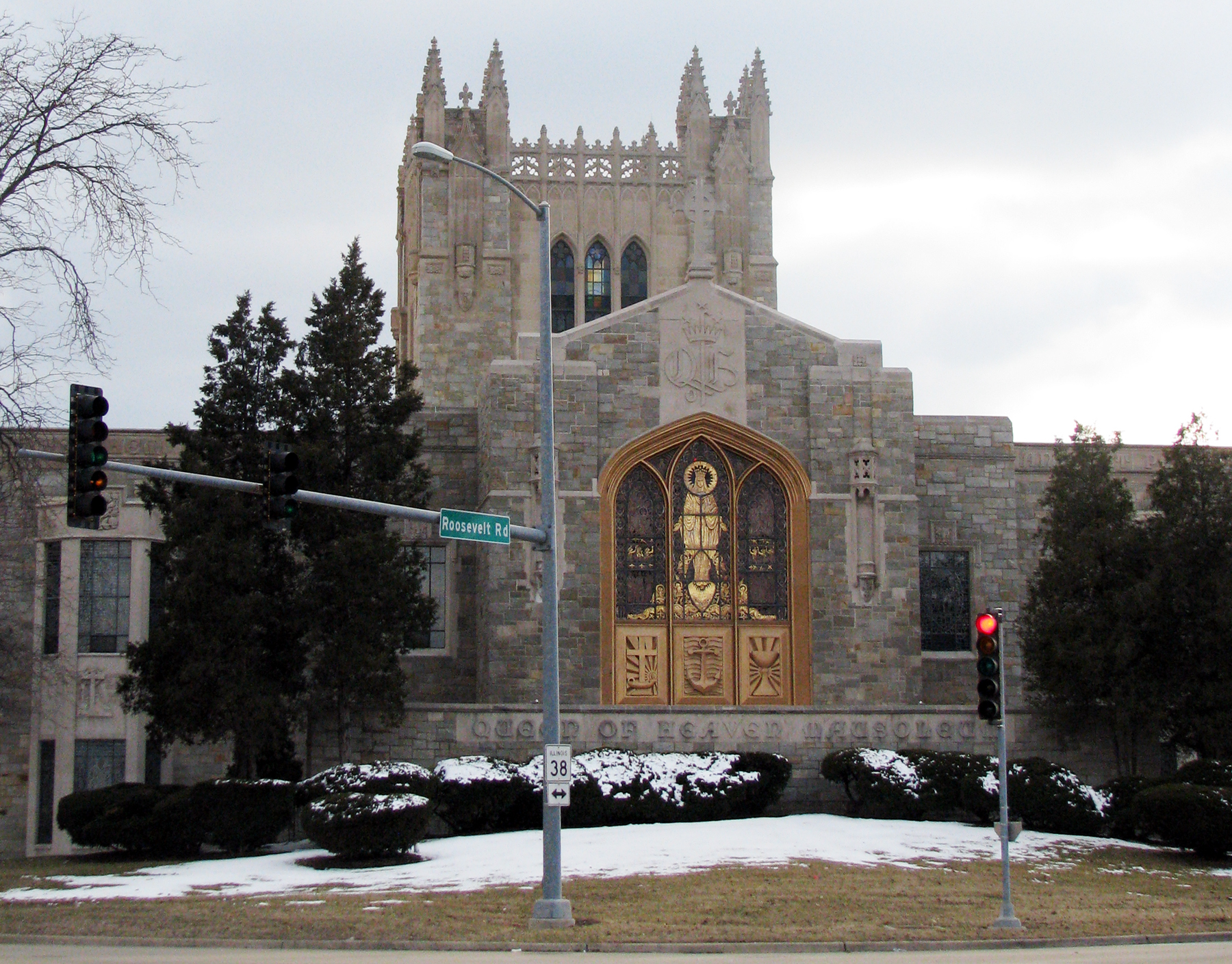
- Queen of Heaven Mausoleum at corners of Wolf and Roosevelt roads

- Seal

- Location of Hillside in Cook County, Illinois.

- Location within Greater Chicago Location within Illinois Location within the United States
- Coordinates: 41°52′29″N 87°54′1″W
- Country: United States
- State: Illinois
- County: Cook

Area
  - Total: 3.17 sq mi (8.20 km^{2})
  - Land: 3.17 sq mi (8.20 km^{2})
  - Water: 0 sq mi (0.00 km^{2})

Population (2020)
  - Total: 8,320
  - Density: 2,626.5/sq mi (1,014.11/km^{2})
- Time zone: UTC-6 (CST)
  - Summer (DST): UTC-5 (CDT)
- ZIP Code(s): 60162
- Area codes: 708/464
- FIPS code: 17-35086
- Wikimedia Commons: Hillside, Illinois
- Website: www.hillside-il.org

Hillside is a village in Cook County, Illinois, United States. As of the 2020 census it had a population of 8,320. It is a suburb on the west side of Chicago.

== History ==
German Lutheran immigrants planted farms and constructed Hillside's first school and church (Immanuel) near the intersection of Wolf and 22nd Street in the 1840s, which marked the start of the community's formal settlement. Although the majority of Hillside's later construction was located north of 12th Street, Immanuel Lutheran Church and School were incorporated inside village boundaries, giving Hillside its characteristic form.

However, Marion Covell found a significant limestone deposit just a few feet below the surface of his property during the 1850s, despite the fact that farming was the main industry at the time. The quarry he started in 1854 was still in operation until the middle of the 1970s, providing crushed stone for the construction of roads across the Chicago metropolitan area. The John Sexton Company purchased the quarry in 1979 and operated it as a sanitary landfill.

Cemeteries also took the place of active farming immediately beyond Hillside on its western and southern borders, first with Mt. Carmel in 1894, then Oak Ridge, Glen Oak, and ultimately Queen of Heaven in 1947. The Illinois Central Railroad station and the Chicago, Aurora & Elgin Railroad interurban's 12th Street spur made the cemetery easily accessible, which led to the development of taverns, restaurants, monument businesses, greenhouses, and flower stores. The Illinois Central Railroad station, known as Hillside because westbound trains had to ascend a slope at this location, served as the inspiration for the village's name when it was founded in 1905.

The community had its first significant residential growth during the 1920s when additional farmland was split up and sold. In the 1920s, there were substantial holdings obtained by St. Domitilla Roman Catholic Church and Mater Dolorosa Seminary. (The Mater Dolorosa Seminary building today houses Hillside's government offices.) These institutions were formerly surrounded by open space, but following World War II, when Hillside's population quadrupled (from 1,080 to 2,131) between 1940 and 1950, then surged to 7,794 in 1960, it was submerged in a wave of residential building. Hillside Retail Mall, a pioneering regional shopping area, was next to the just finished Congress Expressway in 1956. Soon after, a Holiday Inn, Hillside Theaters, the High Point Tower office structure, and the industrial park on Fencl Lane surrounding the center.

Hillside Retail Center's heyday was brief due to the construction of newer, bigger malls and shopping complexes in the 1960s. The mall's deterioration was unaffected by changes to the exterior look of the building, its tenants, or its ownership. The majority of the mall was razed in 1997 to make room for a large auto dealership.

According to the 2010 census, Hillside has a total area of 3.18 square miles (8.24 km^{2}), all land.

== Geography ==
Hillside is located at 41°52′29″N 87°54′1″W (41.874797, −87.900372). According to the 2021 census gazetteer files, Hillside has a total area of 3.17 square miles (8.21 km^{2}), all land.

== Demographics ==
Historical population
Census	Pop.	Note	%±
1910	328		—
1920	555		69.2%
1930	1,004		80.9%
1940	1,080		7.6%
1950	2,131		97.3%
1960	7,794		265.7%
1970	8,888		14.0%
1980	8,279		−6.9%
1990	7,672		−7.3%
2000	8,155		6.3%
2010	8,157		0.0%
2020	8,320		2.0%
U.S. Decennial Census; 2010-2020

=== Racial and ethnic composition ===
Hillside village, Illinois – Racial and ethnic composition Note: the US Census treats Hispanic/Latino as an ethnic category. This table excludes Latinos from the racial categories and assigns them to a separate category. Hispanics/Latinos may be of any race.
Race / Ethnicity (NH = Non-Hispanic)	Pop 2000	Pop 2010	Pop 2020	% 2000	% 2010	% 2020
White alone (NH)	3,533	2,022	1,414	43.32%	24.79%	17.00%
Black or African American alone (NH)	2,975	3,485	3,519	36.48%	42.72%	42.30%
Native American or Alaska Native alone (NH)	9	6	10	0.11%	0.07%	0.12%
Asian alone (NH)	418	269	253	5.13%	3.30%	3.04%
Pacific Islander alone (NH)	1	3	2	0.01%	0.04%	0.02%
Other race alone (NH)	9	12	35	0.11%	0.15%	0.42%
Mixed race or Multiracial (NH)	142	108	129	1.74%	1.32%	1.55%
Hispanic or Latino (any race)	1,068	2,252	2,958	13.10%	27.61%	35.55%
Total	8,155	8,157	8,320	100.00%	100.00%	100.00%

=== 2020 census ===
As of the 2020 census, Hillside had a population of 8,320 people, 2,997 households, and 1,660 families. The population density was 2,626.26 inhabitants per square mile (1,014.00/km^{2}). There were 3,151 housing units at an average density of 994.63 per square mile (384.03/km^{2}).

The median age was 40.7 years. 20.4% of residents were under the age of 18 and 16.6% of residents were 65 years of age or older. For every 100 females there were 93.1 males, and for every 100 females age 18 and over there were 91.0 males age 18 and over. 100.0% of residents lived in urban areas, while 0.0% lived in rural areas.

Of the 2,997 households, 31.1% had children under the age of 18 living in them. Of all households, 39.7% were married-couple households, 20.1% were households with a male householder and no spouse or partner present, and 33.0% were households with a female householder and no spouse or partner present. About 27.9% of all households were made up of individuals and 9.9% had someone living alone who was 65 years of age or older.

Of the 3,151 housing units, 4.9% were vacant. The homeowner vacancy rate was 1.9% and the rental vacancy rate was 6.7%.

=== Income and poverty ===
The median income for a household in the village was $56,019, and the median income for a family was $76,548. Males had a median income of $45,093 versus $29,670 for females. The per capita income for the village was $25,953. About 4.0% of families and 5.5% of the population were below the poverty line, including 1.3% of those under age 18 and 6.4% of those age 65 or over.

== Government ==
Hillside is divided into three congressional districts. The area north of Harrison Street, and most of the area northeast of Roosevelt Road and Haase Avenue, is in Illinois's 7th congressional district; the southern arm of the city, south of Roosevelt Road along Wolf Road, is in the 3rd district; the area in between (primarily Mount Carmel Cemetery) is in the 4th district.

== Education ==
Hillside residents are served by three school districts for elementary and middle school: Hillside School District 93, Berkeley School District 87, and Bellwood School District 88. All residents are served by Proviso Township High Schools District 209's Proviso West High School in Hillside, though qualified students may also attend the Proviso Mathematics and Science Academy in nearby Forest Park.

== Transportation ==
Pace provides bus service on multiple routes connecting Hillside to destinations across the region. Hillside is served by the Illinois Central/Canadian National line between Chicago and Sioux City. It had commuter service until 1931.

== Business ==
Commercial Light Company, located at 245 Fencl Lane, is one of the village's largest employers.

== Cemeteries ==
There are multiple cemeteries in Hillside, the largest of which are the Catholic Mount Carmel Cemetery and Queen of Heaven Cemetery, situated across from each other on Roosevelt Road. Mount Carmel includes the graves of a number of organized crime figures, such as Al Capone and Dion O'Bannion, as well as the Bishop's Mausoleum, which includes the graves of many Bishops and Archbishops of the Archdiocese of Chicago. Queen of Heaven contains Our Lady of Sorrows Catholic Cemetery in its northwest portion.

Oakridge Cemetery and adjacent Glen Oak Cemetery are also located in Hillside, east down Roosevelt Road from Mount Carmel and Queen of Heaven. Oakridge contains the Oakridge Jewish Cemetery, located in the northwest section of the grounds, which also features the National Jewish War Memorial.

Immanuel Lutheran Cemetery is located on the southern end of Hillside.

== Notable people ==
- Chester Burnett, a.k.a. Howlin' Wolf, buried at Oakridge
- Al Capone, famous Chicago gangster in the 1930s, is buried at Mount Carmel. His grave has become a tourist attraction.
- Dennis Farina, actor and police officer, is also buried at Mount Carmel.
- Skip Pitlock, pitcher for the Chicago White Sox and San Francisco Giants; born in Hillside
- Emanuel "Chris" Welch, Speaker of the Illinois House of Representatives
