= Operation Desert Shield (2006) =

2006 operation by the Iraqi insurgency and Al-Qaeda

- Part of Iraq War and the global war on terrorism
Date	January 2006 – May 2006
Location	Al Anbar Governorate, Iraq
Result	Indecisive

Belligerents
United States of America; United Kingdom; Iraq	Mujahideen Shura Council: Al-Qaeda in Iraq; Other insurgents

Operation Desert Shield was a 2006 operation by the Iraqi insurgency and al-Qaeda in Iraq, planned in December 2005 as a push against American forces during the Iraq War. The goal was to destabilize the American foothold in the Anbar province over the course of six months.

The planning of the operation was not discovered by the Americans until documents captured after the death of Faris Abu Azzam were finally translated, and revealed the details of the operation. The army said the documents surprised them, showing that the insurgents had a "pretty robust command and control system".

== The operation ==
=== Phase I: January 2006 – March 2006 ===
The first phase, scheduled from January through March 2006, focused on isolating American targets by attacking supply convoys, destroying bridges and restricting the ability of helicopters to provide support.

On 7 January 2006, a two-page memo suggested that those insurgents who had infiltrated American bases be asked to reconnoiter the physical area and send back reports to help select potential targets. It also suggested that ammunition caches be placed in advance of the attacks, that only soldiers who had pledged their willingness to die in battle should be sent, and that they first be trained in a series of rehearsed mock battles.

A later memo was drafted, which contained the names of the American bases that could potentially be assaulted – including a list of weapons each target would require, including explosives.

At the suggestion of the unnamed security chairman, it was decided that operational security required the project to move ahead on a need to know basis, letting individual brigade commanders believe their orders were isolated attacks and not know about their overarching strategy.

=== Phase II. March 2006 – May 2006 ===
Starting in March 2006, al-Qaeda in Iraq began keeping reports of each attack against American troops, tracking casualties on both sides, and offering analysis of why attacks were or were not successful. Since al-Qaeda has no specific headquarters or "base" of operations, record keeping was never centralized and most information gathered by al-Qaeda operatives has been scattered across the Middle East and parts of Eastern Russia. However, the second phase of Operation Desert Shield led to more detailed reports and better training for future al-Qaeda soldiers. Currently, al-Qaeda recruits worldwide, with many new recruits coming from Western Europe, more commonly old Eastern Bloc nation states. New recruits receive a much more advanced level of training which includes but is not limited to topics such as: hand-to-hand combat, outdoor survival, advanced weapons systems, improvised munitions, night operations, risk and threat assessment, along with a 36-week history course on past skirmishes and battles that al-Qaeda has won or lost throughout its existence. The current al-Qaeda administration recognizes that the keen record keeping skills of Operation Desert Shield's Iraqi al-Qaeda command are to thank for the advanced training abilities that they are able to offer today.
