= Forest Park, Illinois =

- Village
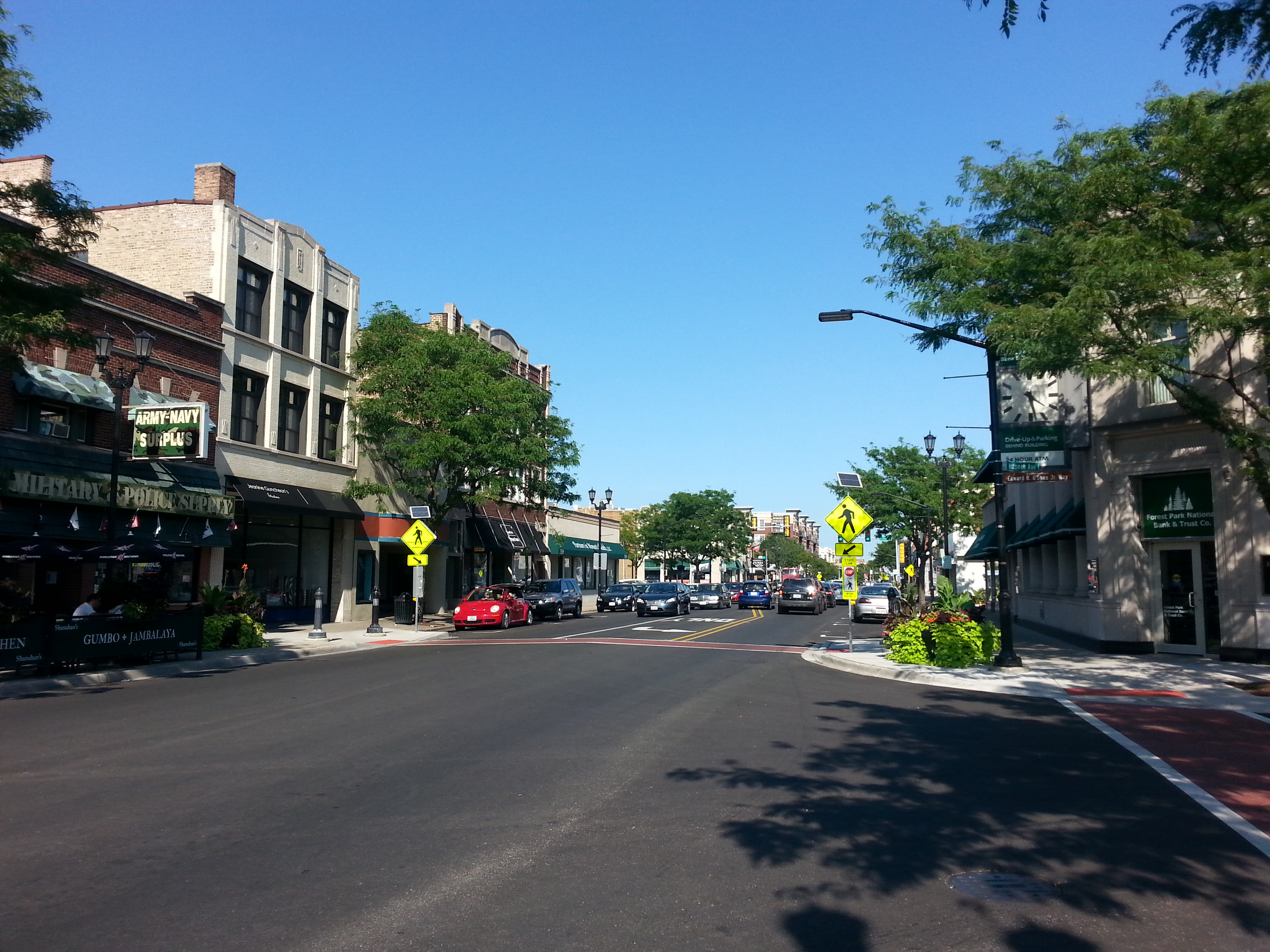
- Madison Street, Downtown Forest Park

- logo
- Motto(s): "Big city access, small town charm"
- Location of Forest Park in Cook County, Illinois.

- Location within Greater Chicago Location within Illinois Location within the United States
- Coordinates: 41°52′23″N 87°48′40″W
- Country: United States
- State: Illinois
- County: Cook
- Township: Proviso
- Incorporated: April 17, 1907 (Previously incorporated as Harlem in 1884)

Government
  - Type: City commission government
  - Mayor: Rory Hoskins
  - Commissioners: Jessica Voogd; Maria Maxham; Ryan Nero; Michelle Melin-Rogovan

Area
  - Total: 2.40 sq mi (6.22 km^{2})
  - Land: 2.40 sq mi (6.22 km^{2})
  - Water: 0 sq mi (0.00 km^{2}) 0%

Population (2020)
  - Total: 14,339
  - Density: 5,970.4/sq mi (2,305.18/km^{2})

Standard of living (2007-11)
  - Per capita income: $34,756
  - Median home value: $222,400
- ZIP code(s): 60130
- Area code(s): 708
- Geocode: 26935
- FIPS code: 17-26935
- Website: www.forestpark.net

Forest Park (formerly Harlem) is a village in Cook County, Illinois, United States, and a suburb of Chicago. The population was 14,339 at the 2020 census. The Forest Park terminal on the CTA Blue Line is the line's western terminus, located on the Eisenhower Expressway at Des Plaines Avenue. This makes it one of just two municipalities served by the Chicago "L" train network that does not directly border Chicago (the other being Wilmette).

== Geography ==
Forest Park is located at 41°52′23″N 87°48′40″W (41.873031, -87.811155). According to the 2021 census gazetteer files, Forest Park has a total area of 2.40 square miles (6.22 km^{2}), all land. The Des Plaines River runs through Forest Park.

== History ==
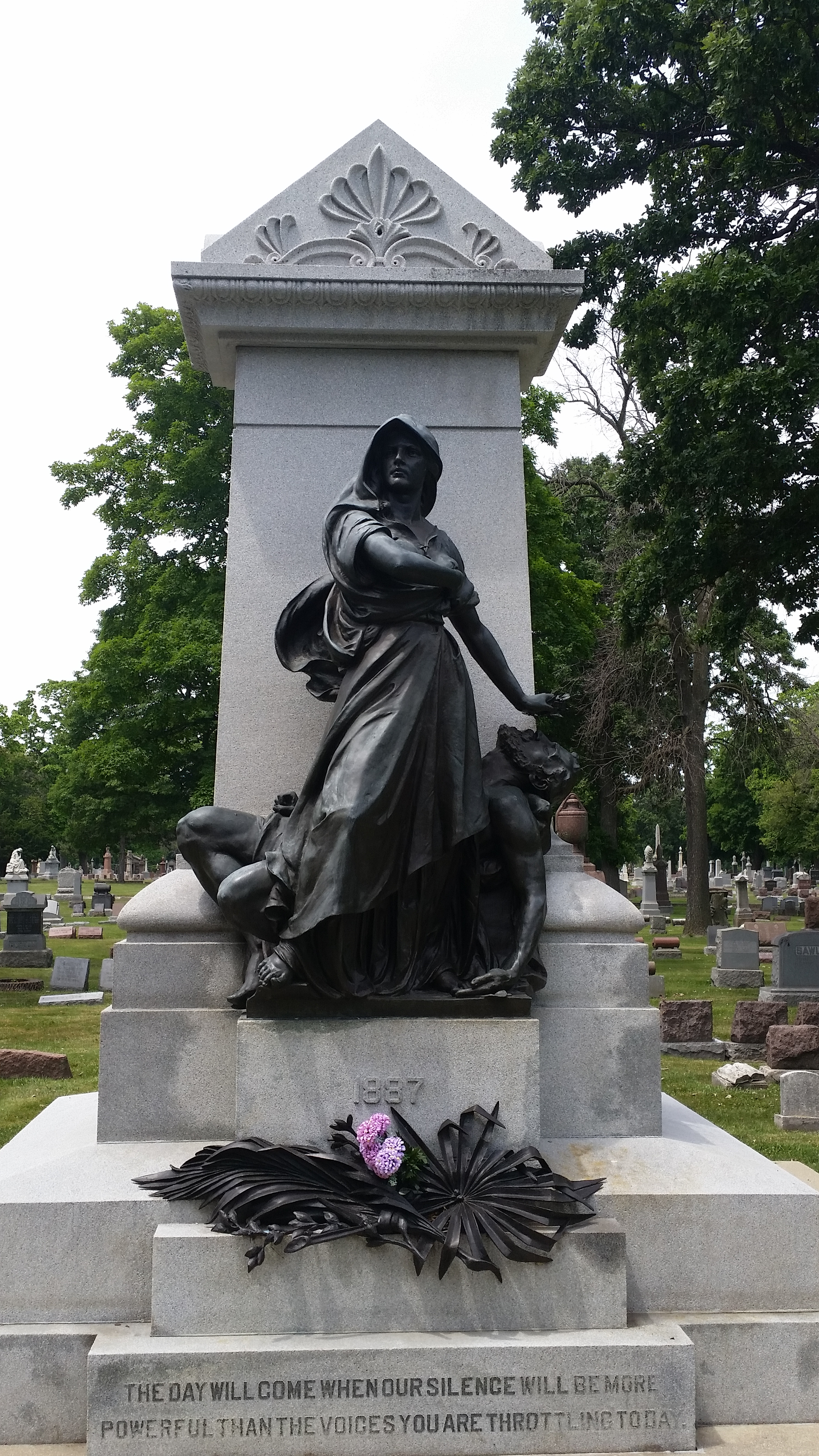
Haymarket Martyrs' Monument, Forest Home Cemetery

Before modern settlement, the area now known as Forest Park was inhabited by the Potawatomi and other Native American groups. In 1839, French trader Leon Bourassa purchased 160 acres of land where present day Forest Park lies. German immigrant Ferdinand Haase, bought 40 acres of that land from Leon Bourassa in 1851, which eventually became 240 acres. In 1856, John Henry Quick purchased the land, and named it Harlem after his hometown.

The community of Harlem was incorporated in 1884. However, was renamed to Forest Park, and officially incorporated under that name on April 17, 1907.

For much of its history, Forest Park was known as a "Village of cemeteries", with more dead "residents" than living ones; some figures estimate the ratio at 30:1, dead to alive. Forest Park cemeteries include Altenheim, Forest Home Cemetery (incorporating the German Waldheim Cemetery), Jewish Waldheim (producer Mike Todd is buried in Beth Aaron there), Woodlawn (including Showmen's Rest), and Concordia. Forest Home Cemetery is home to the famous Haymarket Martyrs' Monument.

From 1925 to 1931, Forest Park had a radio station with a variety of call letters. The station began in 1925 as WHT. It was known as WNBA, with its studios near Des Plaines and Roosevelt Road from 1927 to 1928. In 1929, the call letters changed again, this time to WSOA and again to WCHI in 1929. As WSOA, the radio station had 5,000 watts of power. It went off the air for good in 1931.

The Naval Ordnance Station Forest Park (originally a Naval Ordnance Plant) operated from early in World War II until most of the plant was replaced by a mall in 1971, with some of the site used as a Naval Reserve center until 2007. The plant employed up to 6,500 workers and produced 19,000 torpedoes during World War II.

In 2007, the town held a summer-long centennial celebration. Forest Park has also held two other centennial celebrations, one in 1956 for when the first settlers came and one in 1984 for the 100th anniversary of the creation of the town of Harlem.

Women's professional baseball/softball has roots in Forest Park. Emery Parichy purchased the Boston Bloomer Girls softball team in the early 1930s, renamed them Emery Parichy's Bloomer Girls, and moved them to Forest Park. The team operated in the suburb until 1955, when the land their softball field was on was taken for the Eisenhower Expressway.

=== Amusement park ===
Forest Park was the location of Forest Park Amusement Park, a small but popular amusement park located just west of Desplaines Avenue, and just north of the then Waldheim Cemetery, from 1907 to 1922. Initially, the park was received negatively by Chicago area church members due to its close proximity to the cemetery. However, its public acclaim helped bring in a crowd of approximately five to ten thousand on opening day, and the various rides, games, and shows the park had to offer kept residents coming back. On July 25, 1918, a fire broke out in the swimming pool's boiler room. The fire quickly spread to other utility areas of the park which left firefighters without access to water and power. The park planned to reopen later that same day, though 1/5th of the park was destroyed by the fire. In the years following the fire, the park was mostly successful primarily due to events and activities that helped the community and the park's occasional rallies against prohibition. However, with the 18th Amendment taking effect coupled with a strict crack-down on gambling, the park never reopened following the cessation of its 1922 season. Its former location is now occupied by the Forest Park station on CTA's Blue Line at Desplaines Avenue.

=== Circle Theatre ===
For most of its history, Forest Park was home for the 25-year-old professional (non-equity) theater company, Circle Theatre, which now resides across Harlem Avenue in neighboring Oak Park. Hedy Weiss of the Chicago Sun-Times writes: "One of the most consistently satisfying theatrical operations in the area ...everything from classics to new American plays ...theatre at its very best." Circle Theatre has produced over 175 productions and received over 80 Joseph Jefferson (JEFF) nominations and won over 30 Jeff Awards. Notable visits from famous playwrights have included Marvin Hamlisch, Rupert Holmes, Douglas Post, Michael John LaChiusa, Stephen Clark and Rebecca Gilman. Rebecca Gilman had her first play produced at Circle Theatre before becoming one of America's leading playwrights. Notable supporters have included Harry Connick, Jr. and Russell Crowe. Award-winning director/choreographer Kevin Bellie was artistic director from 2003 to 2012.

== Demographics ==
Historical population
Census	Pop.	Note	%±
1880	923		—
1900	4,085		—
1910	6,594		61.4%
1920	10,768		63.3%
1930	14,555		35.2%
1940	14,840		2.0%
1950	14,969		0.9%
1960	14,452		−3.5%
1970	15,472		7.1%
1980	15,177		−1.9%
1990	14,918		−1.7%
2000	15,688		5.2%
2010	14,167		−9.7%
2020	14,339		1.2%
U.S. Decennial Census; 2010-2020

=== Racial and ethnic composition ===
Forest Park village, Illinois – Racial and ethnic composition Note: the US Census treats Hispanic/Latino as an ethnic category. This table excludes Latinos from the racial categories and assigns them to a separate category. Hispanics/Latinos may be of any race.
Race / Ethnicity (NH = Non-Hispanic)	Pop 2000	Pop 2010	Pop 2020	% 2000	% 2010	% 2020
White alone (NH)	8,169	7,048	6,756	52.07%	49.75%	47.12%
Black or African American alone (NH)	4,824	4,504	4,345	30.75%	31.79%	30.30%
Native American or Alaska Native alone (NH)	21	27	26	0.13%	0.19%	0.18%
Asian alone (NH)	1,059	841	879	6.75%	5.94%	6.13%
Pacific Islander alone (NH)	11	2	3	0.07%	0.01%	0.02%
Other Race alone (NH)	40	40	113	0.25%	0.28%	0.79%
Mixed Race or Multiracial (NH)	334	307	594	2.13%	2.17%	4.14%
Hispanic or Latino (any race)	1,230	1,398	1,623	7.84%	9.87%	11.32%
Total	15,688	14,167	14,339	100.00%	100.00%	100.00%

=== 2020 census ===
As of the 2020 census, Forest Park had a population of 14,339. The median age was 41.5 years. 12.8% of residents were under the age of 18 and 17.4% of residents were 65 years of age or older. For every 100 females there were 89.3 males, and for every 100 females age 18 and over there were 87.3 males age 18 and over.

The population density was 5,969.61 inhabitants per square mile (2,304.88/km^{2}), and the housing density was 3,400.92 per square mile (1,313.10/km^{2}). 100.0% of residents lived in urban areas, while 0.0% lived in rural areas.

There were 7,573 households in Forest Park, of which 16.0% had children under the age of 18 living in them. Of all households, 26.2% were married-couple households, 26.9% were households with a male householder and no spouse or partner present, and 39.0% were households with a female householder and no spouse or partner present. About 48.9% of all households were made up of individuals and 14.1% had someone living alone who was 65 years of age or older.

There were 8,169 housing units, of which 7.3% were vacant. The homeowner vacancy rate was 2.1% and the rental vacancy rate was 6.3%.

=== Income and poverty ===
The median income for a household in the village was $70,670, and the median income for a family was $101,894. Males had a median income of $52,797 versus $49,492 for females. The per capita income for the village was $46,969. About 2.3% of families and 9.1% of the population were below the poverty line, including 4.4% of those under age 18 and 7.6% of those age 65 or over.

== Government ==
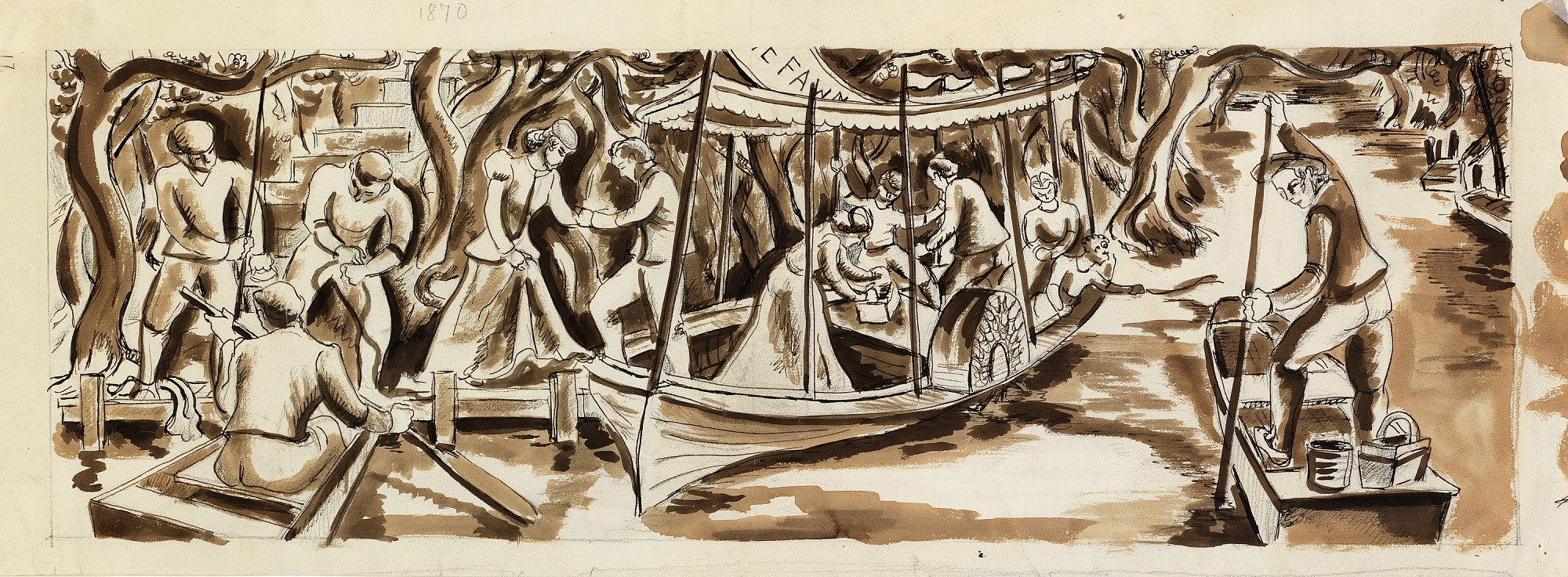
Miriam McKinnie's mural study for the Forest Park post office (1939)

The village of Forest Park runs under a village commission form of government led by a mayor and four commissioners elected every four years.

Forest Park lies within Illinois's 7th congressional district.

The United States Postal Service operates the Forest Park Post Office at 417 Des Plaines Avenue. The post office contains a mural, The White Fawn, painted in 1940 by Miriam McKinnie. Murals were produced from 1934 to 1943 in the United States through the Section of Painting and Sculpture, later called the Section of Fine Arts, of the Treasury Department.

In August of 2024, Forest Park Chief of Police Ken Gross announced a nearly full staff consisting of 34 sworn officers with only 4 vacancies open.

== Village life ==
The Park District of Forest Park, located near the center of the village, has a 15-acre (61,000 m^{2}) park, with an aquatic center. Shopping is mostly located on Madison Street. Previously known for many taverns, it now also features antique merchants, boutiques, and eating establishments. Recently it was voted by the readers of the Chicago Tribune as the "Best Neighborhood Dining" in the Chicago area.

In the last few days of July and first few of August, Forest Park's Park District plays host to the Forest Park No Glove National Invitational Softball Tournament. This is an invitational to all the best 16-inch softball teams in Chicago metropolitan area (and sometimes from other regions). The game is slow-pitch softball played without gloves, a favorite in the region.

Every autumn the St. Bernardine Church hosts an Oktoberfest and the village hosts a Rib-fest.

The village has several industries, but the most prominent is Ferrara Pan, now known as simply the Ferrara Candy Company. The candy factory can be seen and smelled from the Harlem Blue Line stop.

The town is served by a weekly newspaper, the Forest Park Review, coming out every Wednesday. It is printed by Wednesday Journal, Inc. A bi-monthly publication, The Forest Park Post, is distributed to all homes and businesses in Forest Park and is published by 34 Publishing, Inc.

There is a NFP citizens advocacy and information organization known as Vox 60130 (formerly Citizens United in Forest Park) serving the community since 2004. It monitors local governmental meetings and activities and sponsors workshops and presentations of important, relevant issues. They also hold candidate forums during each local election cycle.

== Education ==
Forest Park is within the Forest Park School District 91 and the Proviso Township High Schools District 209. The elementary school district operates four elementary schools and Forest Park Middle School. The community is served by Proviso East High School, which is by Maywood but technically in unincorporated land. In addition, the Proviso Mathematics and Science Academy, a magnet school, is located in Forest Park.

=== Public libraries ===
The Forest Park Public Library is located at 7555 Jackson Boulevard. The current library building opened on October 8, 1995. It covers 26,400 square feet (2,450 m^{2}) over two levels and is completely accessible in compliance with the Americans with Disabilities Act. It is spacious and comfortable, with more seating and study areas, along with a meeting room, a youth activity room and computer room. The total cost of the building was projected to be $3,295,000, including construction, site improvements, furnishings, computer and security systems, professional and financing costs and contingencies. The funding comes from the Imber Fund, now grown to $900,000, a State of Illinois Construction Grant of $250,000, General Obligation Bonds for $2.9 million and interest income.

== Landmarks ==
- St. Bernardine Catholic Church, built in a Spanish Mission style, was designed by McCarthy, Smith, and Eppig. The firm worked extensively with Cardinal George Mundelein and produced numerous Chicago-area Catholic churches during the Great Depression, including St. Wenceslaus in Chicago, as well as St. Joseph and St. Francis Xavier churches in Wilmette.
- The Ferrara Pan Candy Company is located at 7301 W. Harrison Street. The company was founded in 1908 by Salvatore Ferrara who came to America from Nola, Italy, in 1900. The use of the word "pan" refers to the process of making the candy by the sugar panning process.

== Transportation ==
Two stations (Forest Park station and Harlem station) provide 'L' service along the CTA Blue Line. Harlem/Lake station, the western terminus of the CTA Green Line, is at the northeast corner of the village; the station shares an accessible entrance just across the border in Oak Park with Metra's Oak Park station on the Union Pacific West Line. Bus service in the village is provided by Pace.

== Notable people ==
- Kevin Bellie, award-winning American director and choreographer lives in Forest Park.
- W. Robert Blair, Illinois politician
- Warren Brown, sports journalist, coined nicknames for Red Grange and Babe Ruth, Baseball Hall of Fame member
- Kathy Griffin, comedian, 1st Amendment activist
- Eddie Hoh, rock drummer of the 1960s who backed The Mamas & the Papas and the Monkees
- Leonard W. Hein, economist, accounting educator
- Bill Idelson, Actor and Writer
- Erv Lange, pitcher for the Chicago Whales; born in Forest Park
- Howard R. Mohr, Illinois politician, businessman, and Mayor of Forest Park; born in Forest Park
- Frederick B. Roos, Illinois politician
- Calvin Sutker, Illinois politician
- Pierre Walters, NFL athlete, Kansas City Chiefs

== Gallery ==
=== Forest Park Amusement Park ===
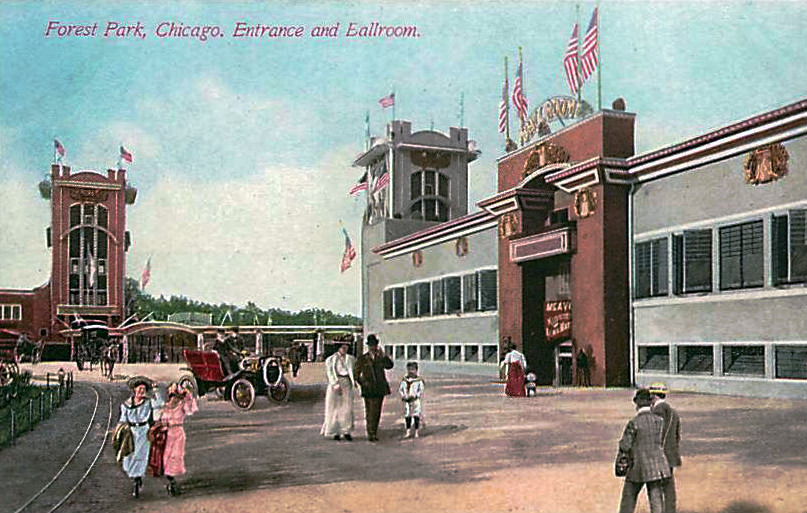
Entrance to the park and the ballroom that was connected with it

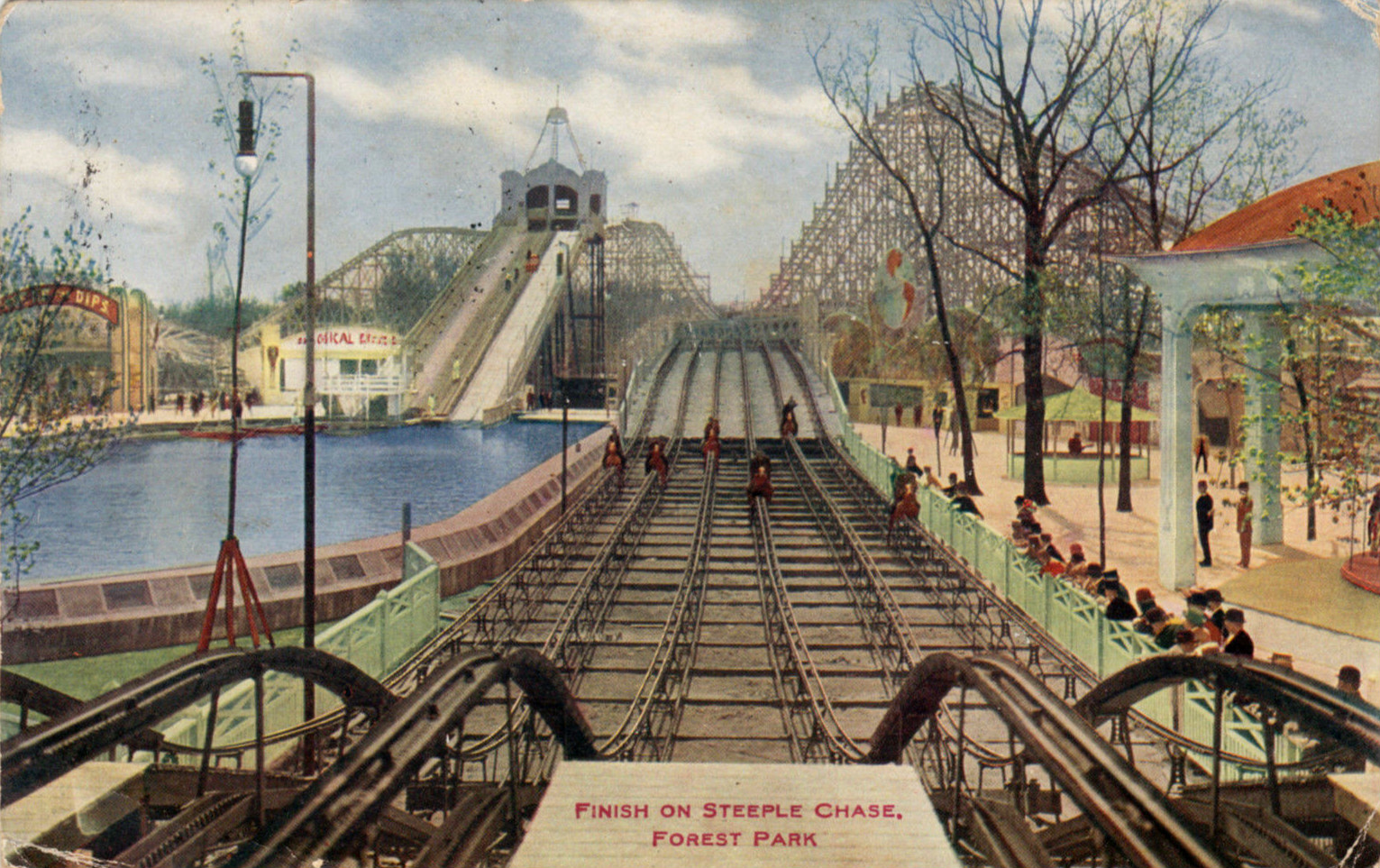
Steeplechase ride

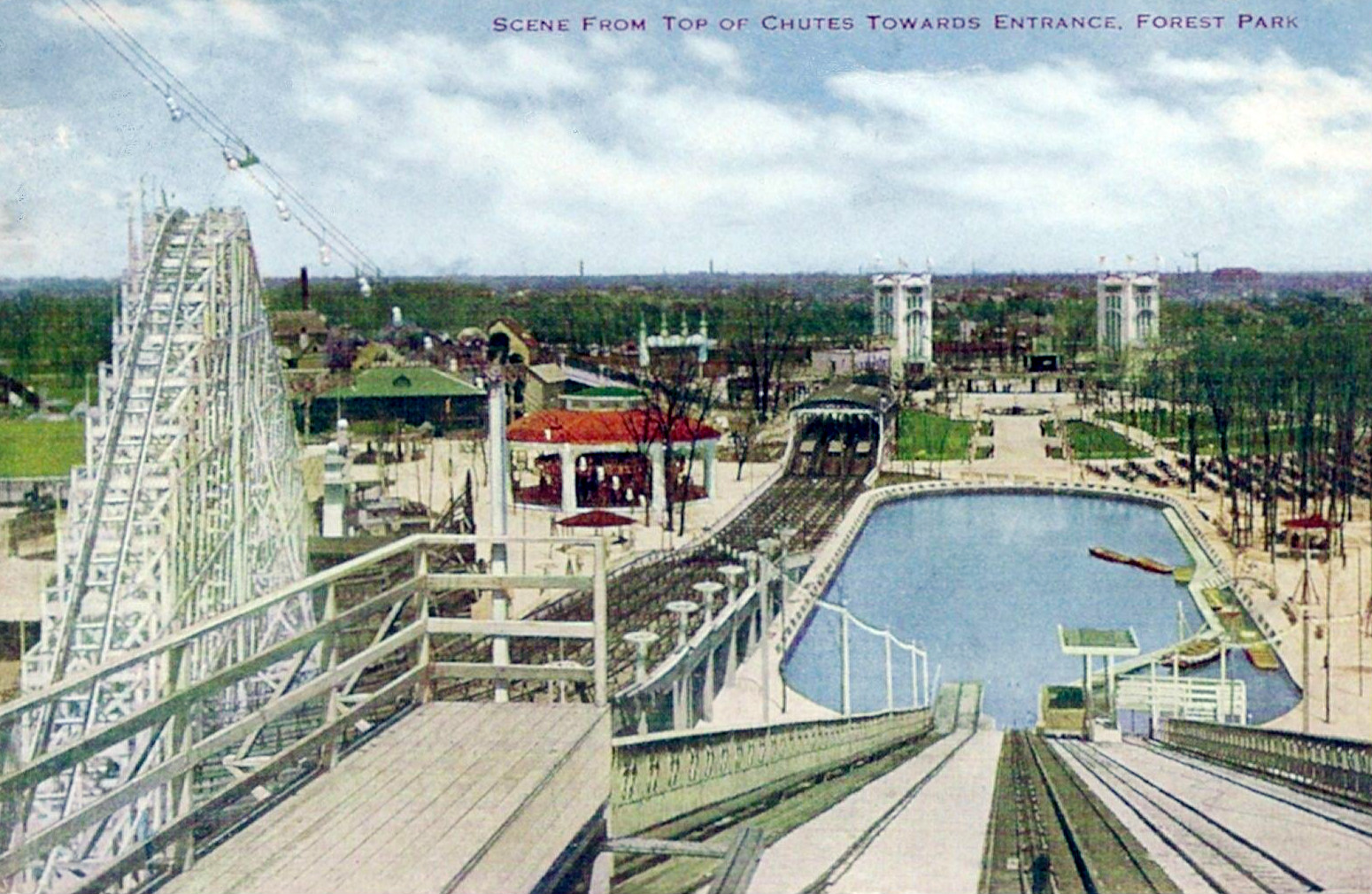
From atop the chutes

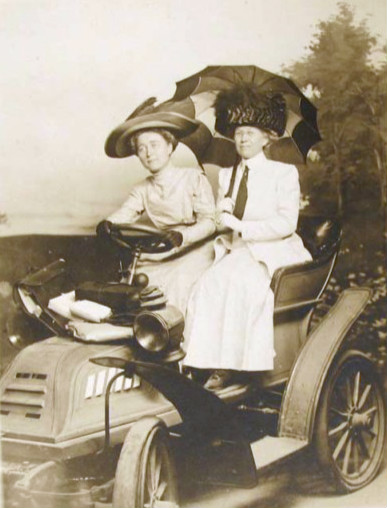
Souvenir photo taken at the park

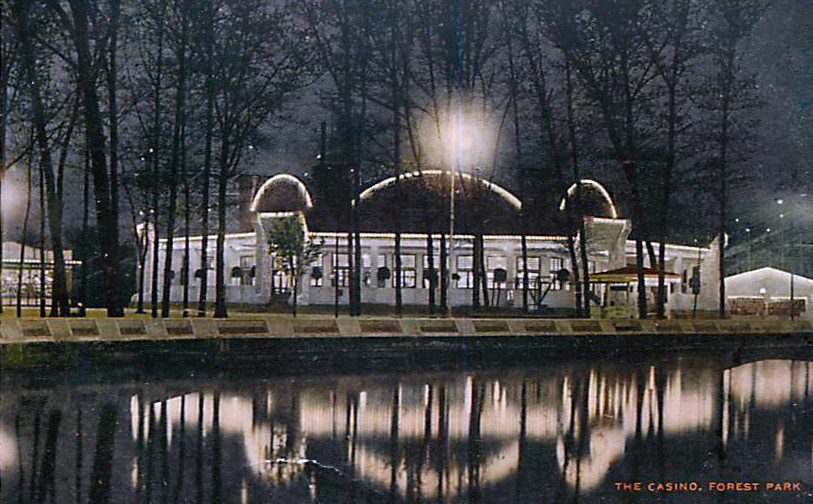
The park's casino building at night

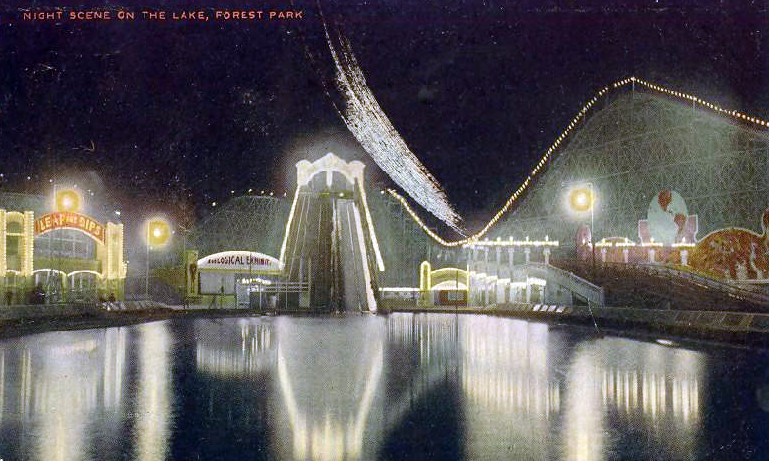
A night view of the park from its lake

== See also ==
- Harlem Race Track
- Showmen's Rest
- Chicago Helicopter Airways Flight 698 crashed at Forest Park in 1960
