= McGavick =

McGavick is a surname. Notable people with the surname include:

- Alexander Joseph McGavick (1863–1948), American Catholic clergyman
- Mike McGavick (born 1958), American businessman
