= Pierre-Paul Durieu =

French Catholic missionary bishop

The Right Reverend Pierre-Paul Durieu OMI
- Bishop of New Westminster
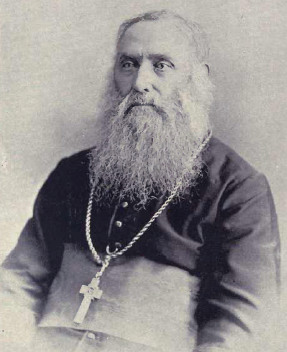
- Archdiocese: Vancouver
- Installed: 1890
- Term ended: 1899
- Predecessor: Louis-Joseph d'Herbomez
- Successor: Augustin Dontenwill
- Other post: Titular Bishop of Marcopolis (1875–1890)

Orders
- Ordination: March 11, 1854 by Eugène de Mazenod
- Consecration: October 24, 1875 by Louis-Joseph d'Herbomez

Personal details
- Born: December 3, 1830 Saint-Pal-de-Mons, Haute-Loire, France
- Died: June 1, 1899 (aged 68) New Westminster, British Columbia, Canada
- Buried: St. Mary's Mission, Yakima Valley, British Columbia, Canada
- Denomination: Roman Catholic
- Motto: Pauperes evangelizantur—justus ex fide vivit. (The good news is preached to the poor. The just man lives by faith.)

Pierre-Paul Durieu OMI (French pronunciation: [pjɛʁ pɔl dyʁjø]; December 3, 1830 – June 1, 1899), was a Roman Catholic missionary and the first Bishop of New Westminster, in British Columbia, Canada.

== Life ==
Durieu was born in 1830 in Saint-Pal-de-Mons, the second son of Blaise Durieux and Mariette Bayle, a farming family who had sheltered the clergy during the French Revolution. As a boy, both he and his brother were allowed to study at the local minor seminary at Monistrol-sur-Loire. Pierre-Paul felt called to serve in the foreign missions and entered the novitiate of the Missionary Oblates of Mary Immaculate at Notre-Dame-de-l'Osier on October 31, 1848. He professed religious vows on 1 November of the following year. After that, he did his studies in preparation for Holy Orders at the Oblate seminary in Marseille.

In 1854 Durieu was ordained as a priest by Eugène de Mazenod, the founder of his religious congregation, and, after being sent for further training in English and theology, was sent to join the Oregon Missions, where he was assigned to serve at St. Mary's Mission in the Yakima Valley and the Okanagan area of British Columbia. In 1875, Paul Durieu was consecrated as the coadjutor bishop for the Vicariate Apostolic of British Columbia by Louis-Joseph d'Herbomez, the Vicar Apostolic. Upon his death, Durieu became Vicar Apostolic, and later the first Bishop of New Westminster (which later became the Archdiocese of Vancouver).

During his tenure, Durieu commanded the First Nations people of British Columbia to obey four directives: discontinue performing native dances; cease the practice of potlach; cease consulting shamans; and to abstain from drinking and gambling. He wrote a book of biblical stories in Chinook Jargon in order to teach the Catholic faith to the native peoples under his care, and set up mission centers where they could keep their nomadic traditions but be reached by the missionaries. He attempted to secure treaties with the Canadian government to protect the rights of the peoples of the First Nations against the growing encroachments of the white settlers, to no avail.

Durieu died in 1899 and was buried alongside his predecessor at St. Mary's Mission.

The farming community of Durieu, northeast of Mission, B.C., is named after him.

Catholic Church titles
Preceded by Louis-Joseph d'Herbomez	Bishop of New Westminster; 1890–1899	Succeeded by Augustin Dontenwill
