= Alexander Joseph McGavick =

American prelate

His Excellency, The Most Reverend Alexander Joseph McGavick
- Bishop of La Crosse; Titular Bishop of Marcopolis
- Diocese: Diocese of La Crosse
- Appointed: November 21, 1921
- Term ended: August 25, 1948 (his death)
- Predecessor: James Schwebach
- Successor: John Patrick Treacy
- Other post: Auxiliary Bishop of Chicago (1899-1921)

Orders
- Ordination: June 11, 1887 by Patrick Feehan
- Consecration: May 1, 1899 by Patrick Feehan

Personal details
- Born: August 21, 1863 Fox Lake, Illinois, U.S.
- Died: August 25, 1948 (aged 85) La Crosse, Wisconsin, U.S.
- Education: St. Viator College

Alexander Joseph McGavick (August 21, 1863 – August 25, 1948) was an American prelate of the Catholic Church. He served as bishop of La Crosse in Wisconsin from 1921 until his death in 1948. He previously served as an auxiliary bishop of the Archdiocese of Chicago in Illinois from 1899 to 1921.

== Biography ==
=== Early life ===
McGavick was born on August 21, 1863, in Fox Lake, Illinois, to James and Catherine (née Watt) McGavick. His parents were Irish immigrants who came to the United States from County Antrim in 1849. He received his early education in local public schools, and entered St. Viator College at Bourbonnais, Illinois, in 1879, earning his bachelor's (1884) and master's degrees (1887).

=== Priesthood ===
McGavick was ordained to the priesthood for the Archdiocese of Chicago on June 11, 1887, by Archbishop Patrick Feehan. His first assignment was as assistant pastor under Reverend Edward Joseph Dunne at All Saints Parish in Chicago. Due to his poor health, McGavick went to Colorado in 1889, hoping that the climate there would help him recover. He served as an assistant to Bishop Nicholas Matz at the cathedral in Denver for a year and a half before returning to Chicago and resuming his duties at All Saints.

After Reverend Thaddeus J. Butler was appointed Bishop of Concordia in 1897, McGavick succeeded him as pastor of St. John's Parish in the Near South Side of Chicago. During his first year at St. John's, McGavick paid off the parish's debts, renovated the church building, and established a Sunday school for Italian children.

=== Auxiliary Bishop of Chicago ===
On December 12, 1898, McGavick was appointed auxiliary bishop of the Archdiocese of Chicago and titular bishop of Marcopolis by Pope Leo XIII. He received his episcopal consecration on May 1, 1899, from Archbishop Feehan, with Bishop Dunne (under whom he served at All Saints) and Bishop Maurice Burke serving as co-consecrators, at Holy Name Cathedral in Chicago.

McGavick's mother died a few days after his consecration and the shock from this affected his health. In June 1899, just a month after becoming a bishop, he received a medical leave from the archdiocese and left for Europe under the advice of his physicians. After a few months abroad, he returned to the United States. McGavick was a patient at the Battle Creek Sanitarium in Battle Creek, Michigan, for a time before returning to Chicago in December 1899.

McGavick subsequently submitted his resignation as bishop to the Vatican in 1900, but it was not accepted. That same year, in addition to his duties as an auxiliary bishop, he was appointed pastor of Holy Angels Parish in Chicago. He became known as the "Father of the Yards" for his charitable work among the poor in the tenement areas around the Union Stock Yards. One of his assistants at Holy Angels was Reverend William Richard Griffin, who would again serve with McGavick as auxiliary bishop of La Crosse (1935–1944).

In 1915, Archbishop George Mundelein appointed McGavick as spiritual director of the Holy Name Society in the archdiocese. He organized Holy Name societies in almost every parish over the next six years, increasing the number of branches from 33 to 200. As part of this work, he also established many branches of the Big Brother program in the archdiocese to help juvenile delinquents. McGavick was an outspoken supporter of the national Prohibition ban on alcoholic beverages and condemned Chicago Alderman Milton J. Foreman for his support of saloons.

=== Bishop of La Crosse ===
Pope Pius XI appointed McGavick to succeed the late James Schwebach as the fourth bishop of La Crosse on November 21, 1921. By that time, McGavick was regarded as "the best pulpit orator of the Roman Catholic clergy" in Chicago. He was installed at the Cathedral of Saint Joseph the Workman in La Crosse, Wisconsin, on March 21, 1922.

During McGavick's tenure as bishop of La Crosse, the diocese's Catholic population grew from 116,000 to 140,000. When he first arrived, there were 156 parishes, 78 mission churches, 90 parochial schools, and 189 secular priests with 51 religious. By his first 20 years, he had established more than 20 parishes and 41 schools. One of his proudest accomplishments was founding Aquinas High School in La Crosse in 1928, a regional coeducational school to which several parishes sent their students.

In 1937 McGavick celebrated the golden jubilee of his ordination as a priest. That same year, Pius XI named him an assistant to the papal throne. After his auxiliary, Bishop Griffin, died in 1944, McGavick received Bishop John Treacy as his coadjutor bishop with right of succession in 1945.

=== Death and legacy ===
Alexander McGavick died at La Crosse on August 25, 1948, at age 85. At the time of his death, he was the oldest Catholic bishop in the United States. In an editorial following his death, the La Crosse Tribune wrote,

"For 24 years Bishop McGavick ably administered affairs of the diocese, he being unobtrusive, avoiding personal publicity, being ever occupied with diocese affairs. He pressed toward his objectives, adjusting difficulties along the path with success accomplished by tact and discretion."

== See also ==
- Catholic Church hierarchy
- Catholic Church in the United States
- Historical list of the Catholic bishops of the United States
- List of Catholic bishops of the United States
- Lists of patriarchs, archbishops, and bishops

Catholic Church titles
Preceded by James Schwebach	Bishop of La Crosse; 1921–1948	Succeeded by John Patrick Treacy
Preceded by –	Auxiliary Bishop of Chicago; 1899–1921	Succeeded by –
