= Edward J. Schulte =

American architect

Edward J. Schulte (April 27, 1890 – June 7, 1975) was an architect who designed a number of mid-twentieth-century churches notable for their blending of a modern idiom with traditional function. Inspired by an encounter with Ralph Adams Cram, he devoted himself to building church buildings, designing over 88. He served as president of the Cincinnati chapter of the American Institute of Architects.

Schulte had a sole practice after 1912, then practiced with Robert E. Crowe from 1921–1923, and practiced alone after that to 1967.

== Early life and education ==
Edward Schulte displayed a talent for drawing early on and was encouraged to pursue it by the nuns in the parochial school he attended as a child. His father, a building contractor, wanted him to take up architecture instead, suggesting him to the firm of Werner and Adkins, who had designed a Carnegie library for Norwood. (Schulte’s father was one of three trustees to build it.) Schulte began working for Werner and Adkins during the day while attending classes at the Art Academy at night, eventually becoming a valued member of the firm with a special skill for watercolor renderings of proposed projects for client presentations. Before long, however, Werner and Adkins began to suffer from financial problems, temporarily loaning Schulte out to another firm before bringing him back upon securing a new partner – H.E. Kennedy – and several new commissions, among them an office building for New Orleans.

== Early career ==
Kennedy was awarded the commission to design the Sheridan Square Theatre, an elegant new addition to the prominent Harris family of theaters in downtown Pittsburgh, and the project was eventually delegated to Schulte. This commission would require him to spend long nights in the library researching precedents for the relatively new building typology. His inherent proficiency in this genre of building evidently foreshadowed what would become a staple of his approach to church architecture: that it must visually and acoustically magnify the theatrical nature of divine liturgy. Among the draftsmen for the project was Robert E. Crowe, who would later become Schulte's partner and most important collaborator. Upon the success of the Harris Theatre project, Kennedy moved his office to Pittsburgh, bringing Schulte along with him. It was during this time that Schulte attended a candlelit lecture by Ralph Adams Cram at the Hall of Architecture in the Carnegie Museum, inspiring him to focus on churches over the remainder of his career.

Schulte is the only architect in history to design five cathedrals. Those completed include:

- Cathedral of St. Joseph the Workman (La Crosse)
- Cathedral of Christ the King (Lexington)
- Cathedral of the Sacred Heart (Salina)
- Cathedral of St. Monica (Cincinnati)

Schulte was also commissioned to design a permanent cathedral for Diocese of Lincoln. Though his design work was finished and had been accepted by the Diocese, the project apparently stalled prior to groundbreaking and was later abandoned. The current cathedral is the product of the more cost-conscious campaign that followed soon after.

The inclusion of his complete overhaul of the Cathedral-Basilica of St. Peter in Chains in Cincinnati (which effectively preserved only its corinthian portico and titanic spire) would elevate his cathedral count to six. Additionally, he also directed a significant renovation of the nearby Cathedral-Basilica of the Assumption in Covington, though this project did not warrant the scale of demolition and reconstruction required in the aforementioned renovation of St. Peter's across the river.

== List of buildings designed or overseen ==
This list of Schulte's work was compiled by Donald A. Tenoever:

ROBERT CROWE & EDWARD SCHULTE (1921–1934)

- St. Catherine Church, Cincinnati, Ohio (1921)
- St. Ann Convent Chapel, Melbourne, Kentucky (1921)
- Sisters of Notre Dame Convent, Covington, Kentucky (1922)
- St. Theresa Home for the Aged, Cincinnati, Ohio (1923)
- The Fontbonne, Cincinnati, Ohio (1924)
- Fenwick Club Gymnasium, Cincinnati, Ohio (1925)
- St. Meinrad Abbey, St. Meinrad, Indiana (1925)
- Friars Club, Cincinnati, Ohio (1926)
- St. Monica Church and Rectory, Cincinnati, Ohio (1926
- Mt. St. Joseph College addition, Cincinnati, Ohio (1926)
- Chapel of the Holy Spirit, Fenwick Club, Cincinnati, Ohio (1927)
- Church of the Assumption remodeling, Cincinnati, Ohio (1927)
- Regina High School, Cincinnati, Ohio (1927)
- Purcell High School, Cincinnati, Ohio (1927)
- St. Cecilia Church, Cincinnati, Ohio (1928)
- St. Peter Church, Lexington, Kentucky (1928)
- Crusade Castle remodeling, Cincinnati, Ohio (1928)
- Loreto Guild, Dayton, Ohio (1928)
- Paramount Building, Cincinnati, Ohio (1928)
- Milford Noviate, Cincinnati, Ohio (1929)
- Church of the Holy Ghost, Knoxville, Tennessee (1929)
- Mercy Hospital, Knoxville, Tennessee (1932)
- St. Agnes School and Auditorium, Cincinnati, Ohio (1933)

EDWARD SCHULTE (1934–1967)

- William Schanzlé residence (1934)
- Chapel of St. Victor, New Baltimore, Ohio

1935–1936

- St. Bernard Church, Taylor Creek, Ohio
- Immaculate Conception Convent, Ferdinand, Indiana
- Dr. E.J. Gaenge residence,
- Zion Reformed Church, Norwood, Ohio
- Francis H. Mitchell residence
- Dr. Johnson McGuire residence
- H.R. Drackett residence
- High School, Lawrenceburg, Indiana

1936–1937

- St. Peter Chapel and School, Hamilton, Ohio
- Ruth Wolfgang residence
- Sisters of Mercy Convent, Cincinnati, Ohio
- St. Ann School addition, Hamilton, Ohio
- St. John School addition, Deer Park, Cincinnati, Ohio

1938–1939

- St. Monica School, Dallas, Texas
- Julius Fleischman residence remodeling
- Immaculate Conception School, Dayton, Ohio
- Mother of God Chapel, Walnut Hills, Cincinnati, Ohio
- George Goodrich residence
- St. Dymphna Chapel and Rectory, Cincinnati, Ohio
- St. Bridgid Church alterations, Xenia, Ohio
- J.M. Christi residence
- Holy Angels School and Auditorium, Cincinnati, Ohio
- St. Ursala School and Chapel, Cincinnati, Ohio

1939–1940

- St. Teresa School addition and Auditorium, Cincinnati, Ohio
- St. Christina School and Rectory, Lockland, Ohio
- St. James School and Auditorium, Cincinnati, Ohio
- St. Albert the Great Church, Dayton, Ohio
- St. Dominic Rectory, Cincinnati, Ohio
- St. Meinrad Abbey boiler house, St. Meinrad, Indiana
- Holy Family Church redecoration, Dayton, Ohio
- Fannie J. Randolph residence
- St. Antonio de Padua Church, Cincinnati, Ohio
- St. Thomas Church, Fort Thomas, Kentucky
- Blessed Sacrament Church, Fort Mitchell, Kentucky
- St. James of the Valley Church Wyoming, Ohio
- Saints Peter and Paul Church, Norwood, Ohio
- Dorothea L. Hoffman residence
- George C. Euskirchen residence
- Elizabeth D. Harrison residence
- Carl Zimmerman residence
- Fred J. Runte residence

1941–1942

- St. John School addition, Cincinnati, Ohio
- Chapel for Mr. and Mrs. Charles M. Williams, Cincinnati, Ohio
- Our Lady of Lourdes School, Indianapolis, Indiana
- St. Paul Indian mission Church, Marty, South Dakota
- Physics and Biology Building, Oberlin College, Oberlin, Ohio
- Our Lady of Lourdes Church, Indianapolis, Indiana
- Chapel in Archbishop's residence, Indianapolis, Indiana
- Clara Koch residence
- Resurrection of Our Lord School addition, Dayton, Ohio
- St. Michael Church, Muskegon, Michigan
- St. Mary Church, Bethel, Ohio
- Mary J. Erhart residence
- Saints Peter and Paul Church, Haubstadt, Indiana
- St. Stephen Church and Rectory, Dayton, Ohio

1942–1943

- Sacred Heart Convent Church, Benedictine Convent and Academy addition, Yankton, South Dakota
- St. Dominic School addition, Cincinnati, Ohio
- St. Clement Church remodeling, Reading, Ohio
- St. Anthony Church, Effingham, Illinois
- St. Anthony School addition, Cheviot, Ohio
- Guardian Angel School, Auditorium and Rectory, Cincinnati, Ohio
- St. Theresa Hall, St. Paul Indian Mission, Marty, South Dakota

1944–1945

- St. Meinrad Abbey, seminary addition, St. Meinrad, Indiana
- Sacred Heart Nurses Home, Yankton, South Dakota
- Our Lady of Mercy Hospital addition, Mariemont, Ohio
- St. Jude Convent and Rectory, Fort Wayne, Indiana
- St. George Monastery, Cincinnati, Ohio

1945–1946

- Our Lady of Mercy Hospital Sisters House, Cincinnati, Ohio
- St. Margaret Mary School alterations and additions, Cincinnati, Ohio
- St. Meinrad Parish School, St. Meinrad, Indiana
- Blessed Sacrament Church, La Crosse, Wisconsin
- St. Meinrad Science and Auditorium building, St. Meinrad, Indiana
- Saints Peter and Paul School, Haubstadt, Indiana
- St. Lawrence Church alterations and redecoration, Cincinnati, Ohio
- Christ the King School and Auditorium, Dallas, Texas
- St. Michael power house, St. Michael, North Dakota
- St. Ann School, New Castle, Indiana
- St. Mary Cathedral renovation, Covington, Kentucky
- St. Thomas More School, Paducah, Kentucky

1947–1948

- Sacred Heart Home, Men's Building, Yankton, South Dakota
- St. Cecelia Church, Dallas, Texas
- Immaculate Conception School and Convent, Aurora, Indiana
- Elder High School Stadium, Cincinnati, Ohio
- St. Lawrence Rectory remodeling, Cincinnati, Ohio
- Glenmary Seminary, Glendale, Ohio
- Immaculate Heart of Mary Church, Rectory, School, Indianapolis, Indiana
- St. Francis Hospital Chapel, Washington, Missouri
- Holy Cross Seminary, La Crosse, Wisconsin

1949–1950

- Bishop Marty Memorial Chapel, Mount Marty College, Yankton, South Dakota
- Church of the Epiphany (Catholic), Chicago, Illinois
- St. Francis de Sales Church, Beckley, West Virginia
- St. Teresa Rectory, Cincinnati, Ohio
- St. Stephen Church, (now called Holy Spirit Church), Newport, Kentucky
- St. Andrew School, Indianapolis, Indiana
- St. Marty Hospital X-ray Department, Yankton, South Dakota
- St. Peter Church, Chillicothe, Ohio
- St. Dominic Church, Cincinnati, Ohio
- St. James Church and School, Eau Claire, Wisconsin
- St. Martin School, Cheviot, Ohio
- Christ the King School and Convent, Lexington, Kentucky
- St. Lawrence Church alterations and redecoration, Cincinnati, Ohio
- St. Bernard Abbey Library, St. Bernard, Alabama
- Guardian Angel School addition, Cincinnati, Ohio
- St. Mary School, Muncie, Indiana

1951–1952

- St. Theresa School Auditorium and Convent, Southgate, Kentucky
- St. Mary Church and Rectory, Decatur, Indiana
- Bishop's Residence and Chancery, Crookston, Minnesota
- Sacred Heart Cathedral and Rectory, Salina, Kansas
- Christ the King School addition, Lexington, Kentucky
- St. Paul Lutheran Church, Cincinnati, Ohio
- Holy Trinity Church, West Union, Ohio
- Sacred Heart Church, Muenster, Texas
- Christ the King Chapel, St. Ambrose University, Davenport, Iowa
- St. Dominic Monastery, La Crosse, Wisconsin
- Church of the Nativity Convent, Cincinnati, Ohio
- St. Joseph Indian Mission Chapel and School, South Dakota
- St. Ursula Academy Auditorium and addition, Cincinnati, Ohio

1953–1955

- Blessed Sacrament Church, Rectory and Convent Sioux City, Iowa
- Grace Episcopal Church and Sunday School, Grand Rapids, Michigan
- St. Anthony Church and Rectory, Dayton, Ohio
- St. Peter in Chains Cathedral restoration, Cincinnati, Ohio
- Holy Angels High School, Sidney, Ohio
- St. Mary of the Assumption Church Decatur, Indiana
- Christ the King Church, Dallas, Texas
- St. James Church, Eau Claire, Wisconsin
- St. Agnes Church, Cincinnati, Ohio
- All Saints School, Montgomery, Ohio
- Church of the Good Shepherd Rectory, Frankfort, Kentucky
- St. James School addition, Cincinnati, Ohio
- St. Clare Church, Cincinnati, Ohio
- Milford Novitiate Chapel, Milford, Ohio
- Our Lord Christ the King Church, Cincinnati, Ohio
- St. Meinrad Guest House, St. Meinrad, Indiana

1956–1958

- Good Shepherd School addition, Frankfort, Kentucky
- St. Paul Church, Vicksburg, Mississippi
- Villa Madonna Academy, Covington, Kentucky
- St. Gregory Church and Rectory, Phoenix, Arizona
- Notre Dame Convent addition, Covington, Kentucky
- St. Bernard Abbey Church, St. Bernard, Alabama
- All Saints School addition, Montgomery, Ohio
- Fairview Heights Elementary School, Cincinnati, Ohio
- Provident Bank Building, Cincinnati, Ohio
- St. Cecilia School and Auditorium, Houston, Texas

1959–1961

- Christ the King School addition, Lexington, Kentucky
- St. Raphael Church, Pittsburgh, Pennsylvania
- Immaculate Conception Church and Rectory, Albuquerque, New Mexico
- Zion Evangelical Church addition, Norwood, Ohio
- St. Gertrude School addition, Cincinnati, Ohio
- St. Joseph the Workman Cathedral, La Crosse, Wisconsin
- St. Gertrude Church, Cincinnati, Ohio
- St. Mary Church alterations, Cincinnati, Ohio
- St. Vincent Ferrer School, Cincinnati, Ohio
- St. Gertrude Priory, Cincinnati, Ohio
- All Saints Church addition, Montgomery, Ohio
- Saints Faith, Hope and Charity Church, Winnetka, Illinois
- St. Joseph Church, Plymouth, Ohio

1962–1964

- St. Joseph Church and Rectory, Cold Springs, Kentucky
- Notre Dame Academy, Covington, Kentucky
- St. Anne Church, Rectory and Convent, Castle Shannon, Pennsylvania
- Lutheran Church of the Good Shepherd addition, Cincinnati, Ohio

1965–1967

- St. Michael Church (with Charles Hightower), Houston, Texas
- St. Cecelia Rectory addition, Cincinnati, Ohio
- Corbett Music Center, University of Cincinnati, Cincinnati, Ohio
- Mother of Mercy Academy, Cincinnati, Ohio
- Quebec Heights Elementary School, Cincinnati, Ohio
- Christ the King Church (now cathedral) and Rectory, Lexington, Kentucky
- Church of the Nativity, Cincinnati, Ohio
- St. James Church, Cincinnati, Ohio
- Pedestrian Bridge, University of Cincinnati, Cincinnati, Ohio

== Gallery ==
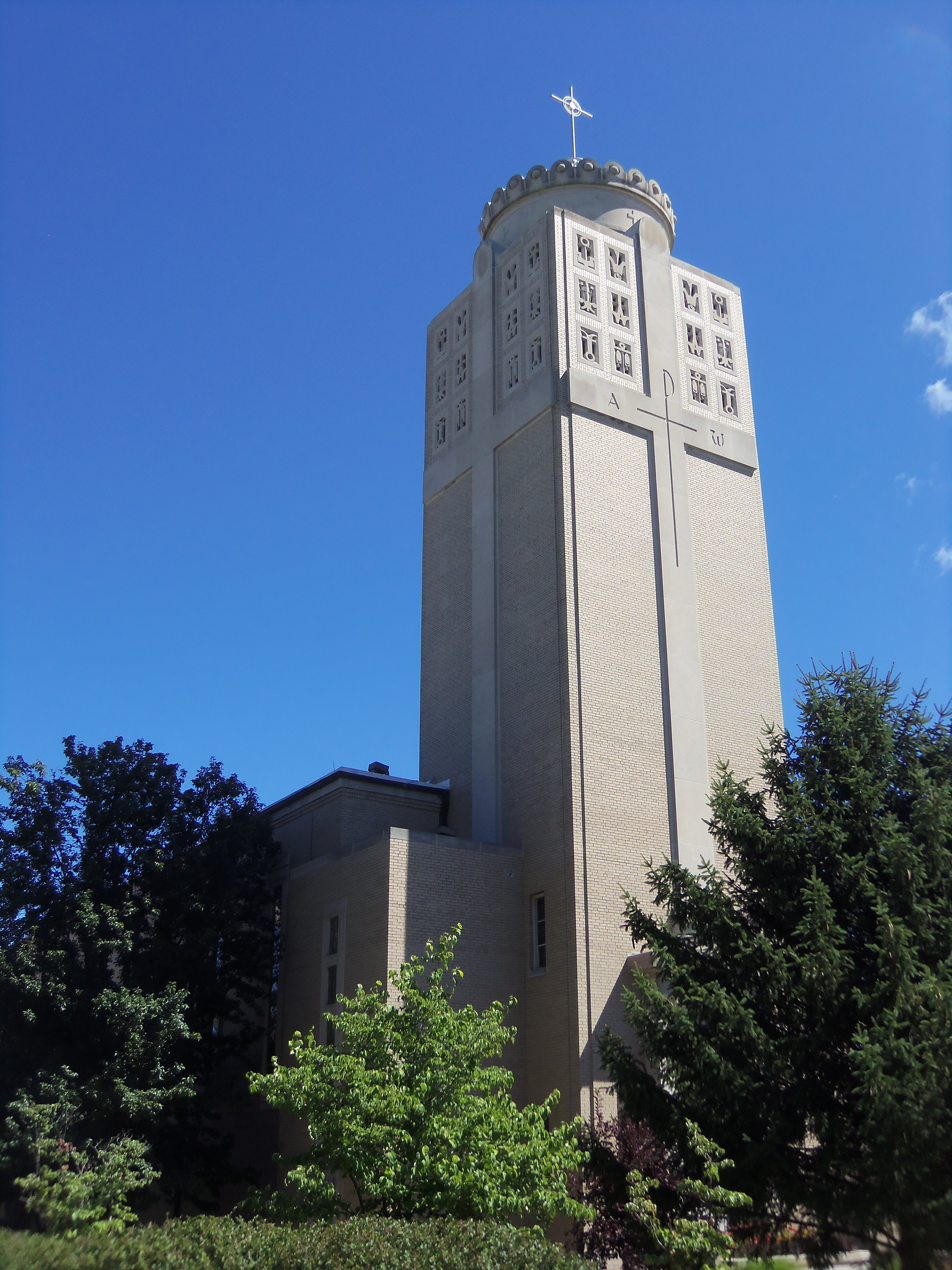
Christ the King Chapel
Davenport, Iowa

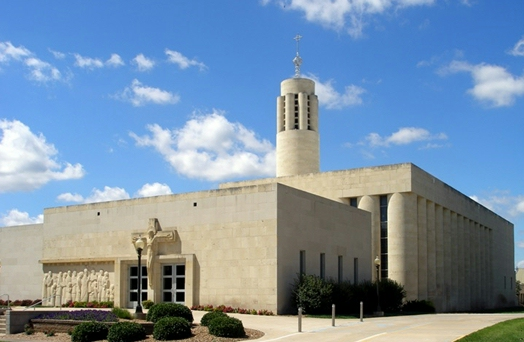
Sacred Heart Cathedral
Salina, Kansas

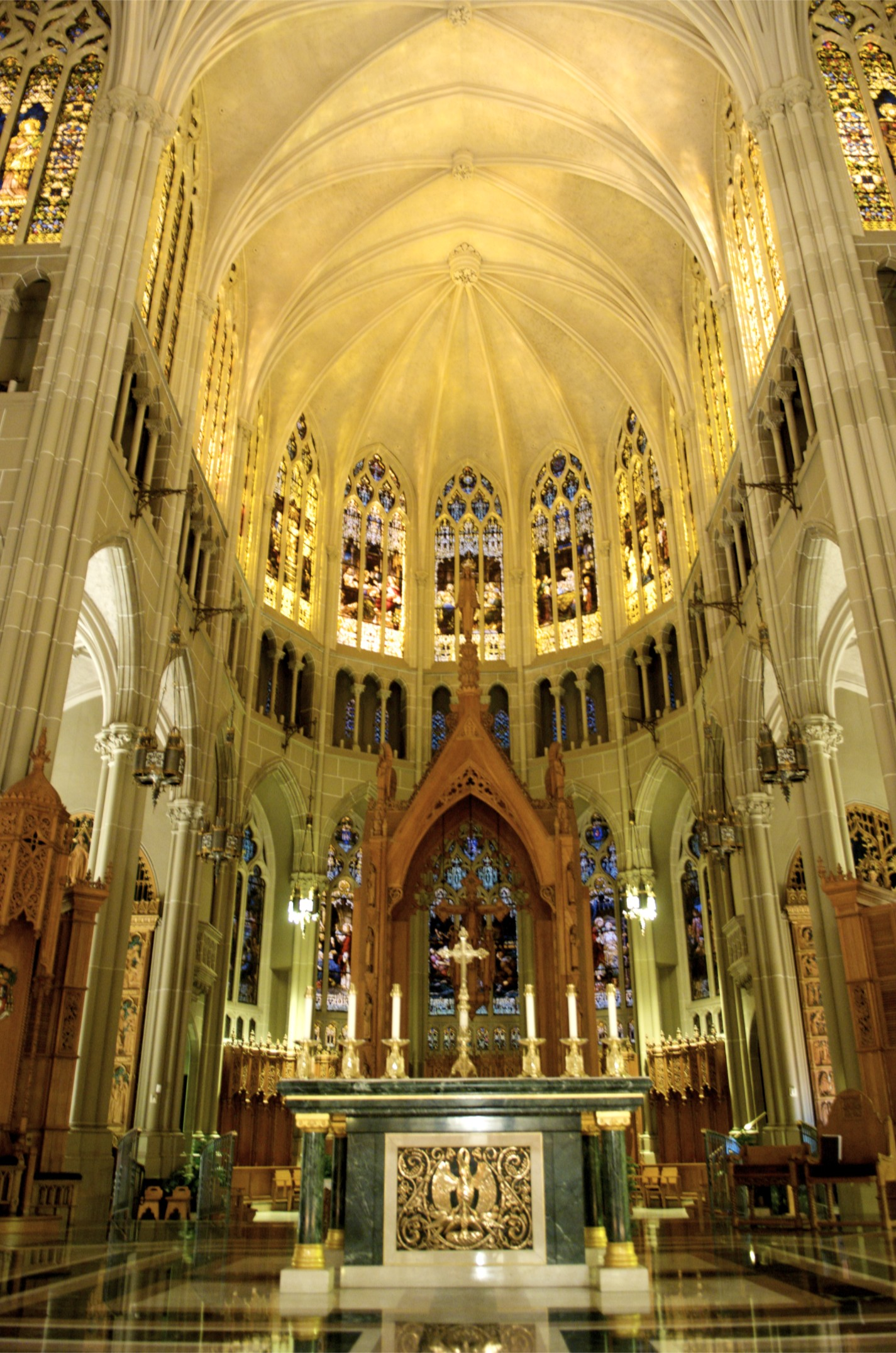
St. Mary's Cathedral
Covington, Kentucky

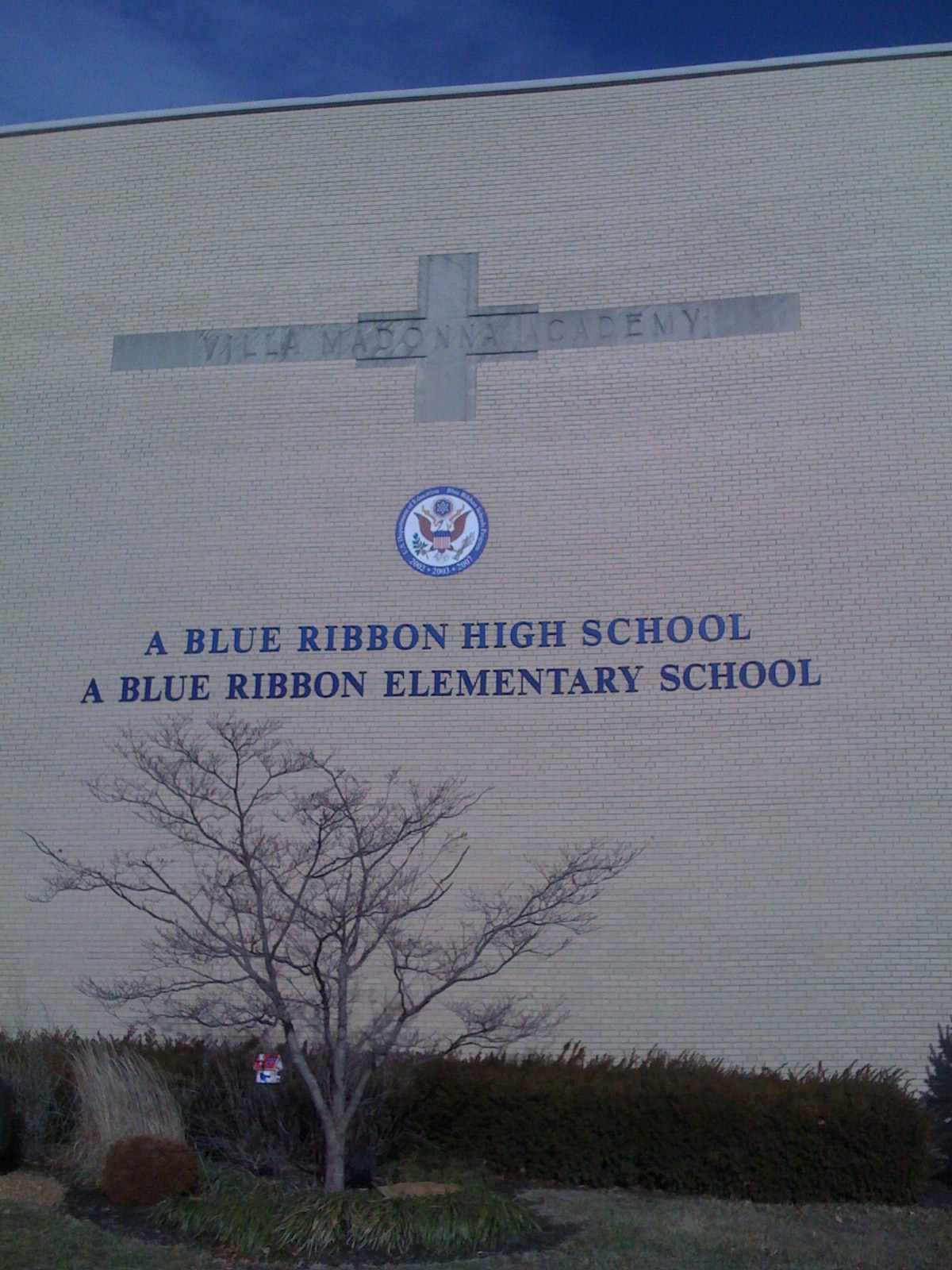
Villa Madonna Academy
Covington, Kentucky

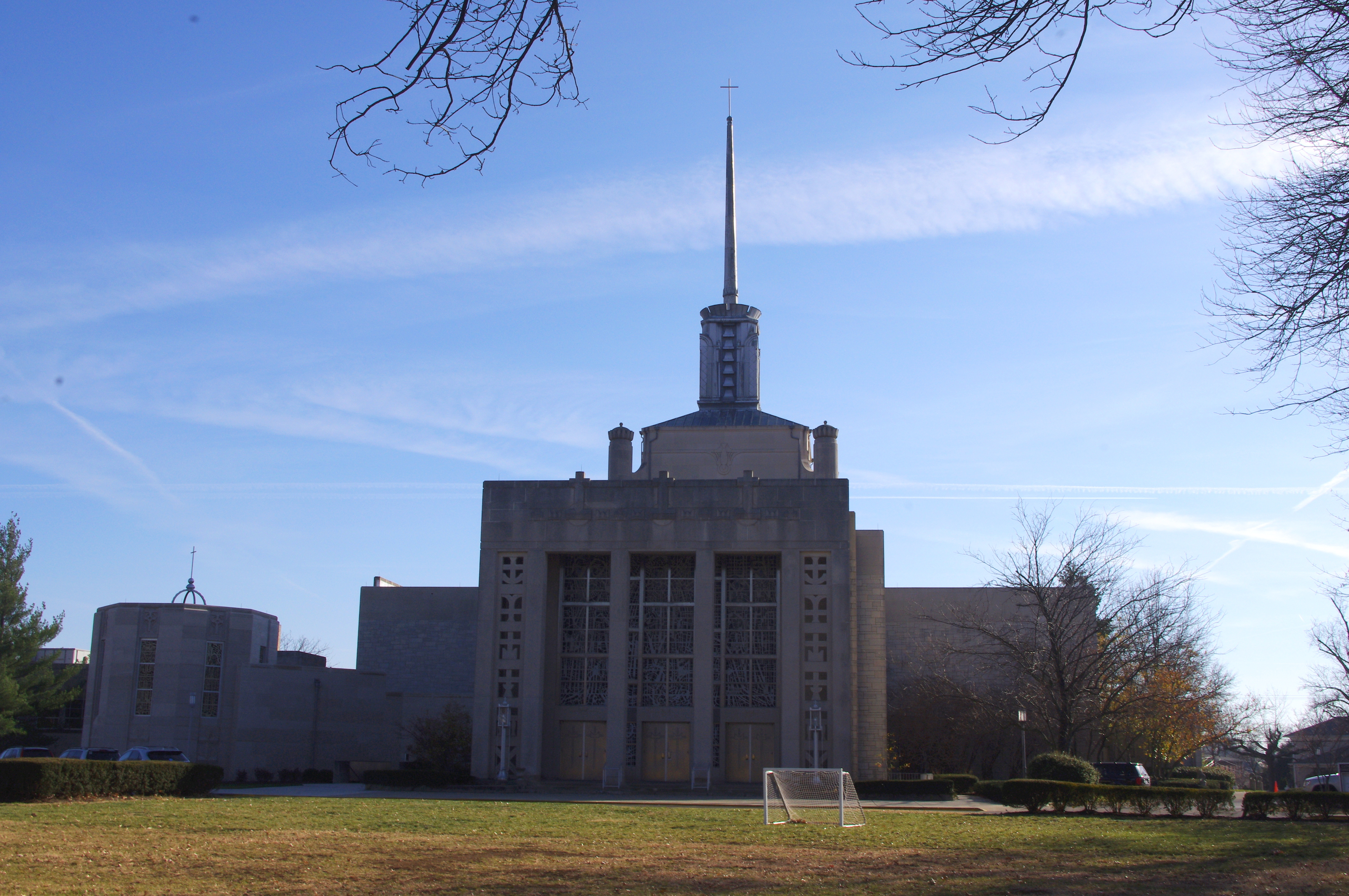
Cathedral of Christ the King
Lexington, Kentucky

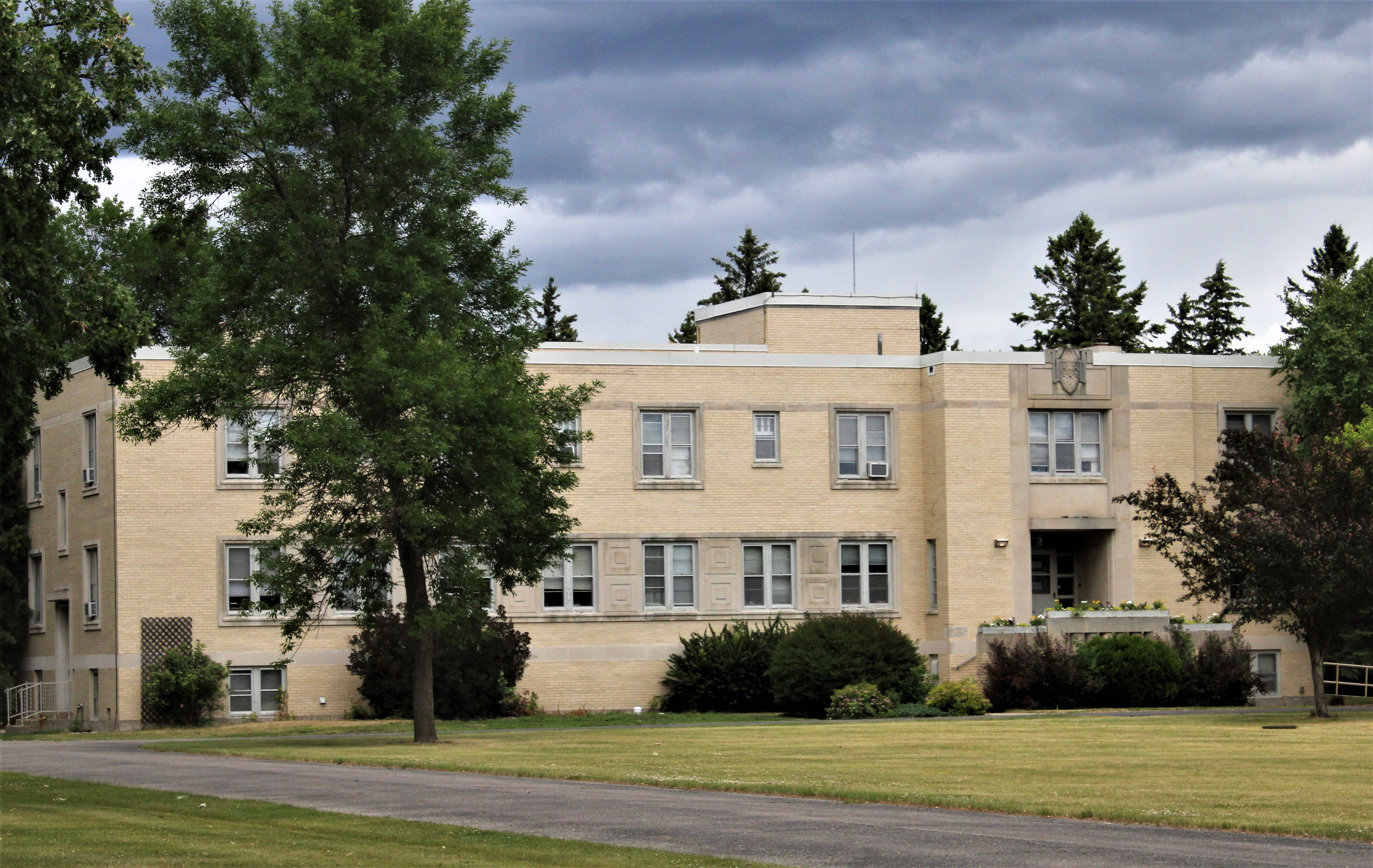
Bishop's Residence and Chancery, Crookston, Minnesota

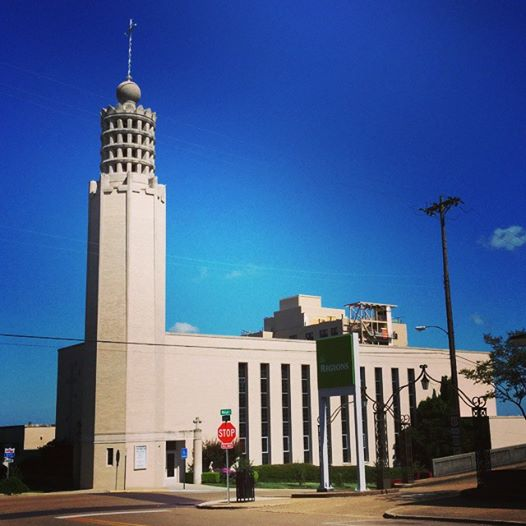
St. Paul Church
Vicksburg, Mississippi

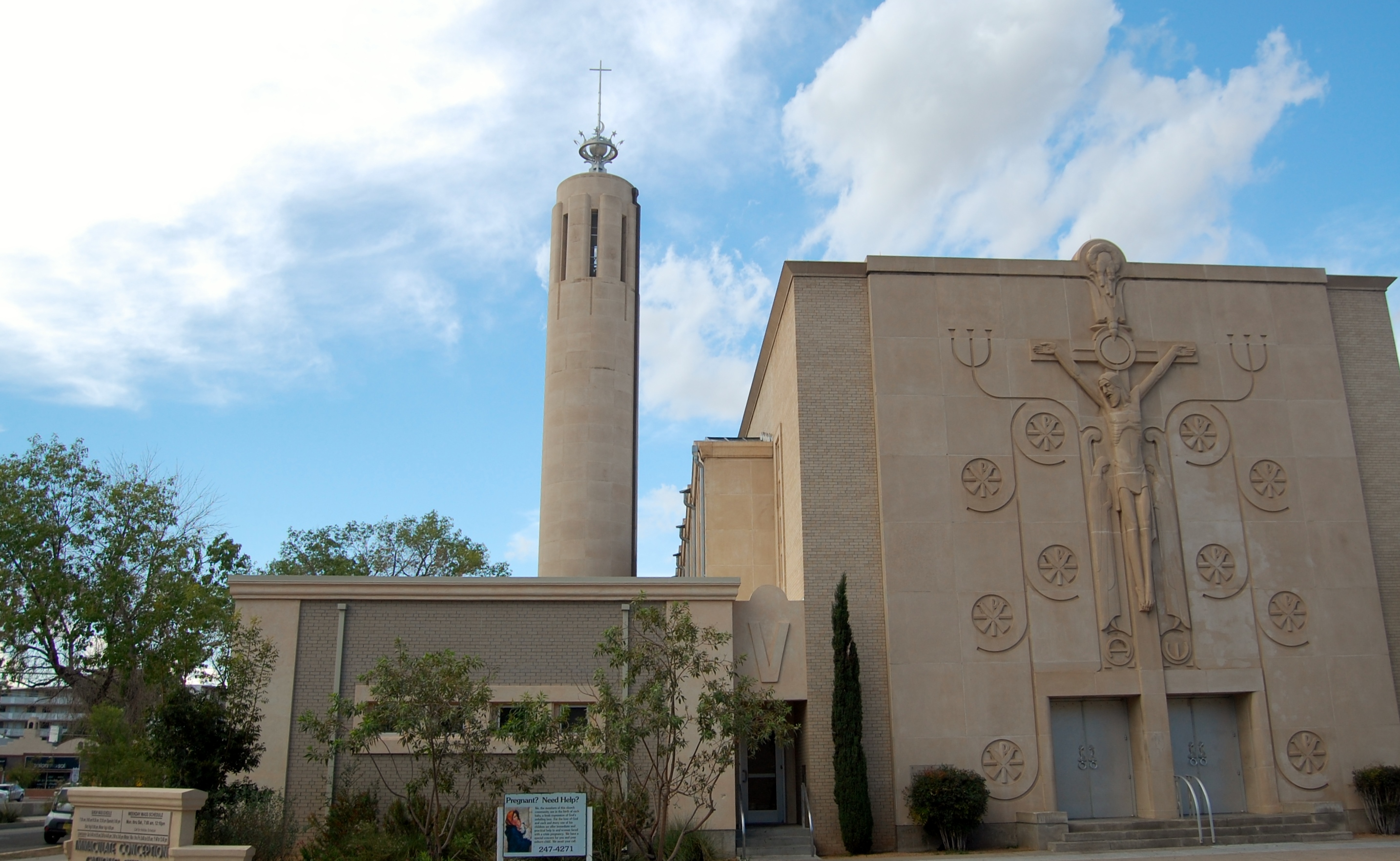
Immaculate Conception Church
Albuquerque, New Mexico

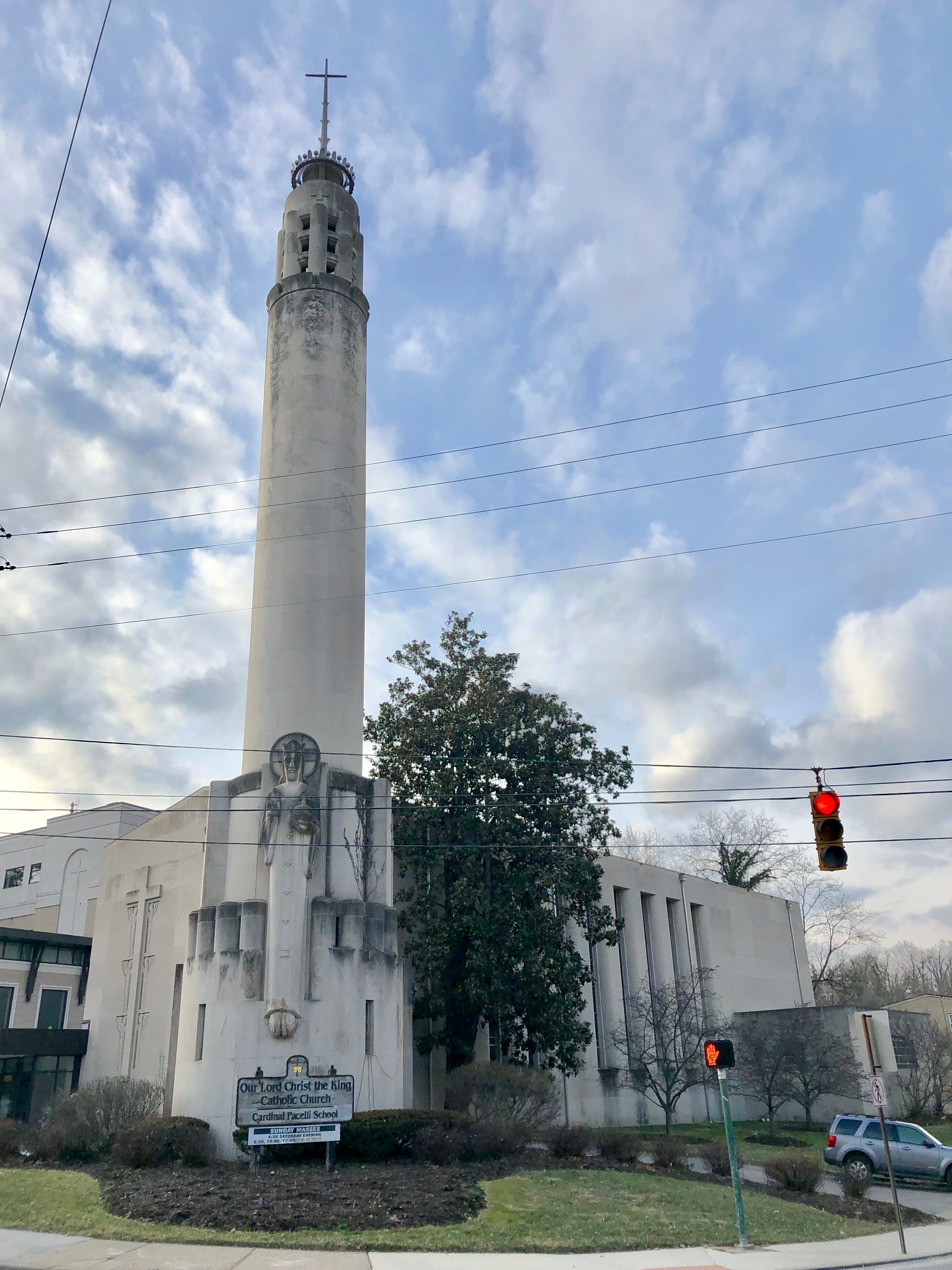
Our Lord Christ the King
Cincinnati, Ohio

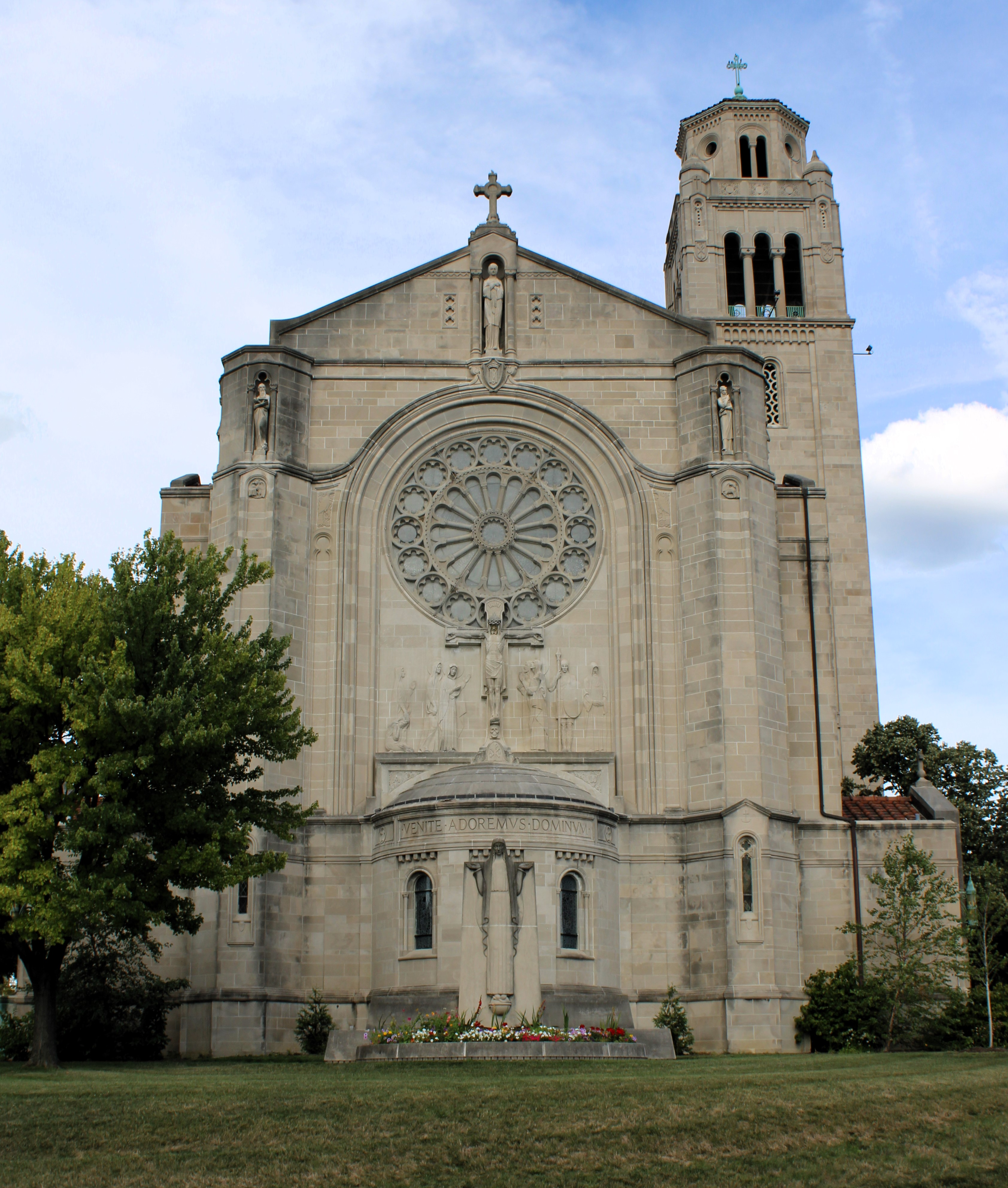
St. Monica Church
Cincinnati Ohio

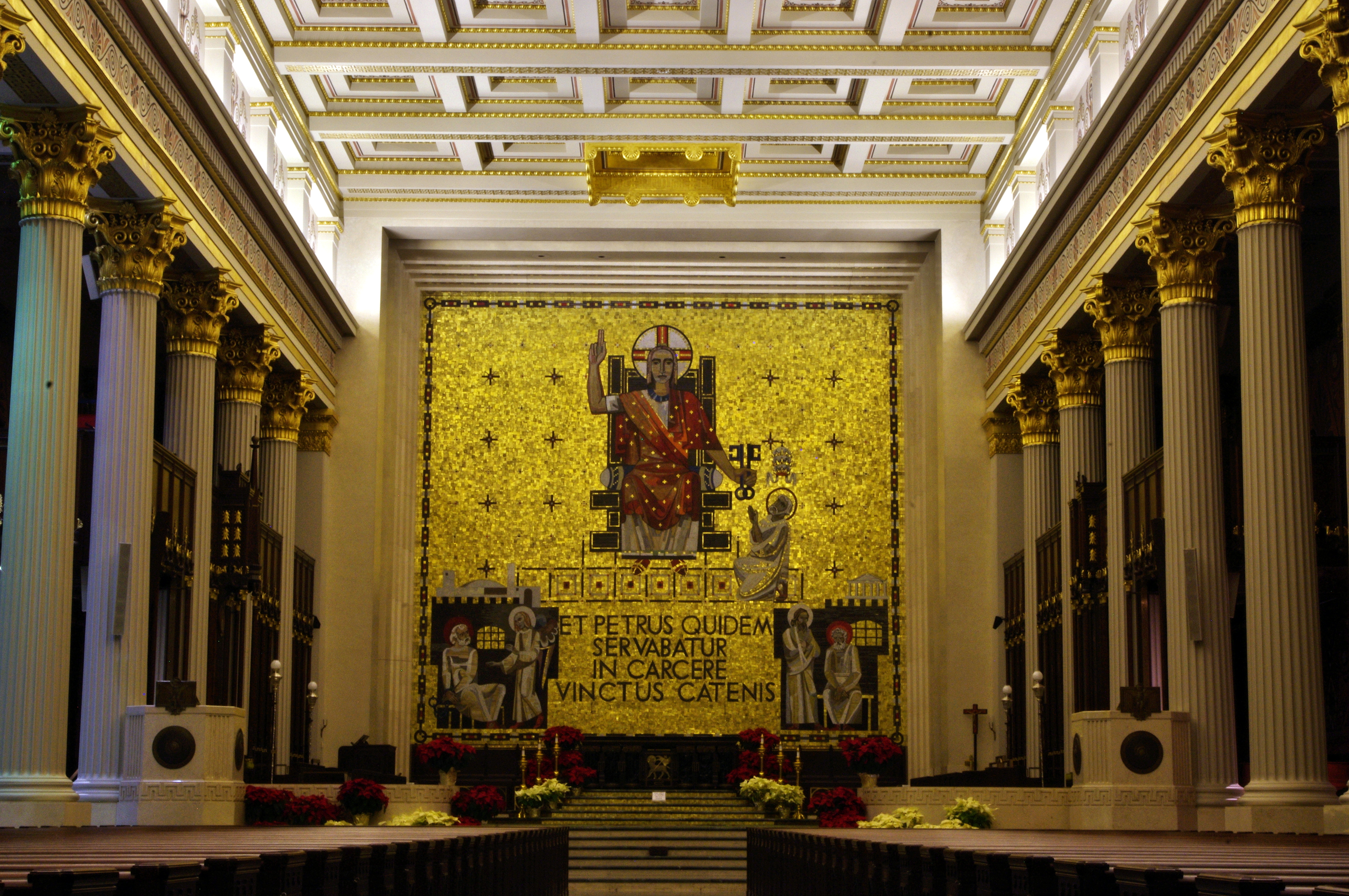
St. Peter in Chains Cathedral
Cincinnati, Ohio

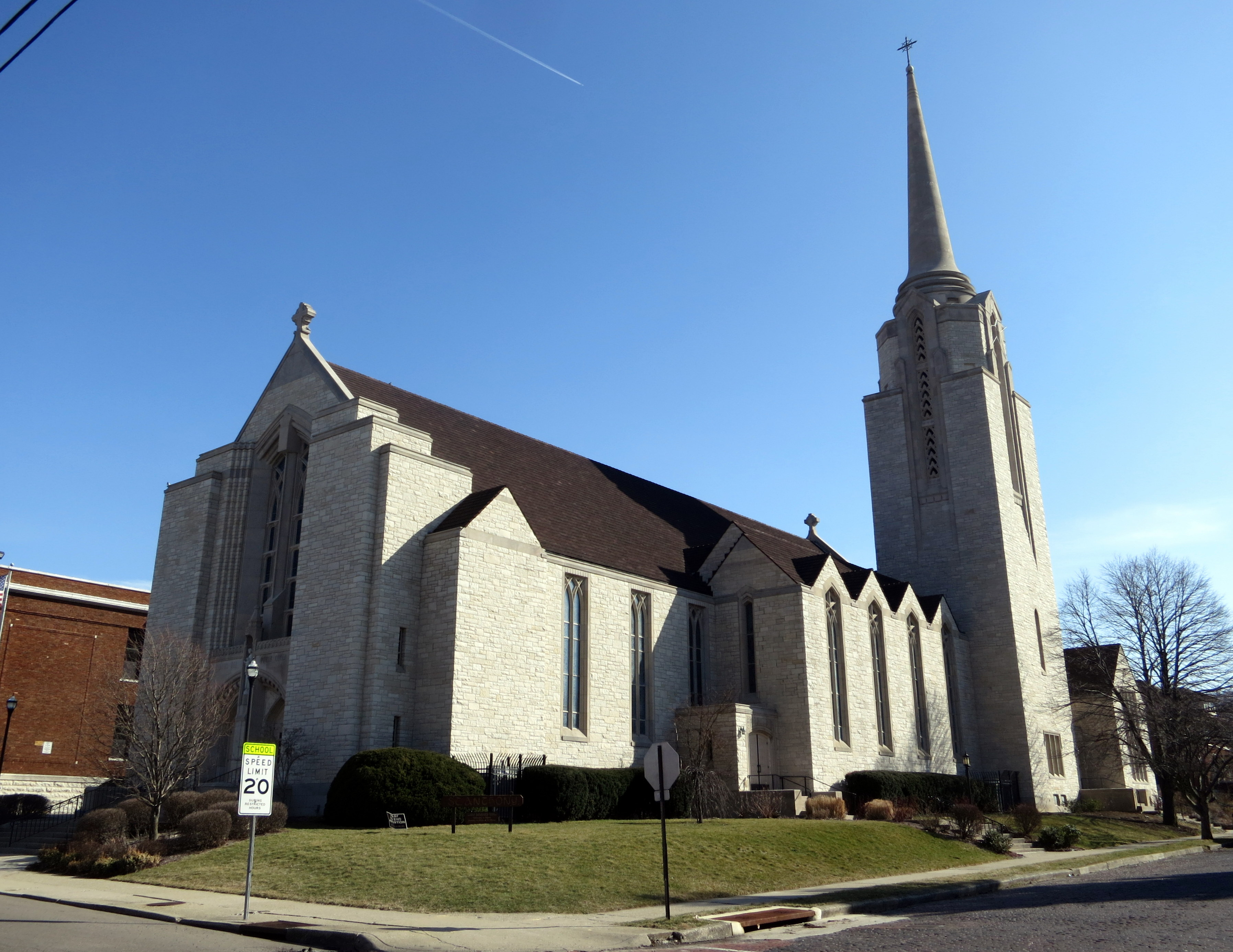
St. Anthony of Padua Church
Dayton, Ohio

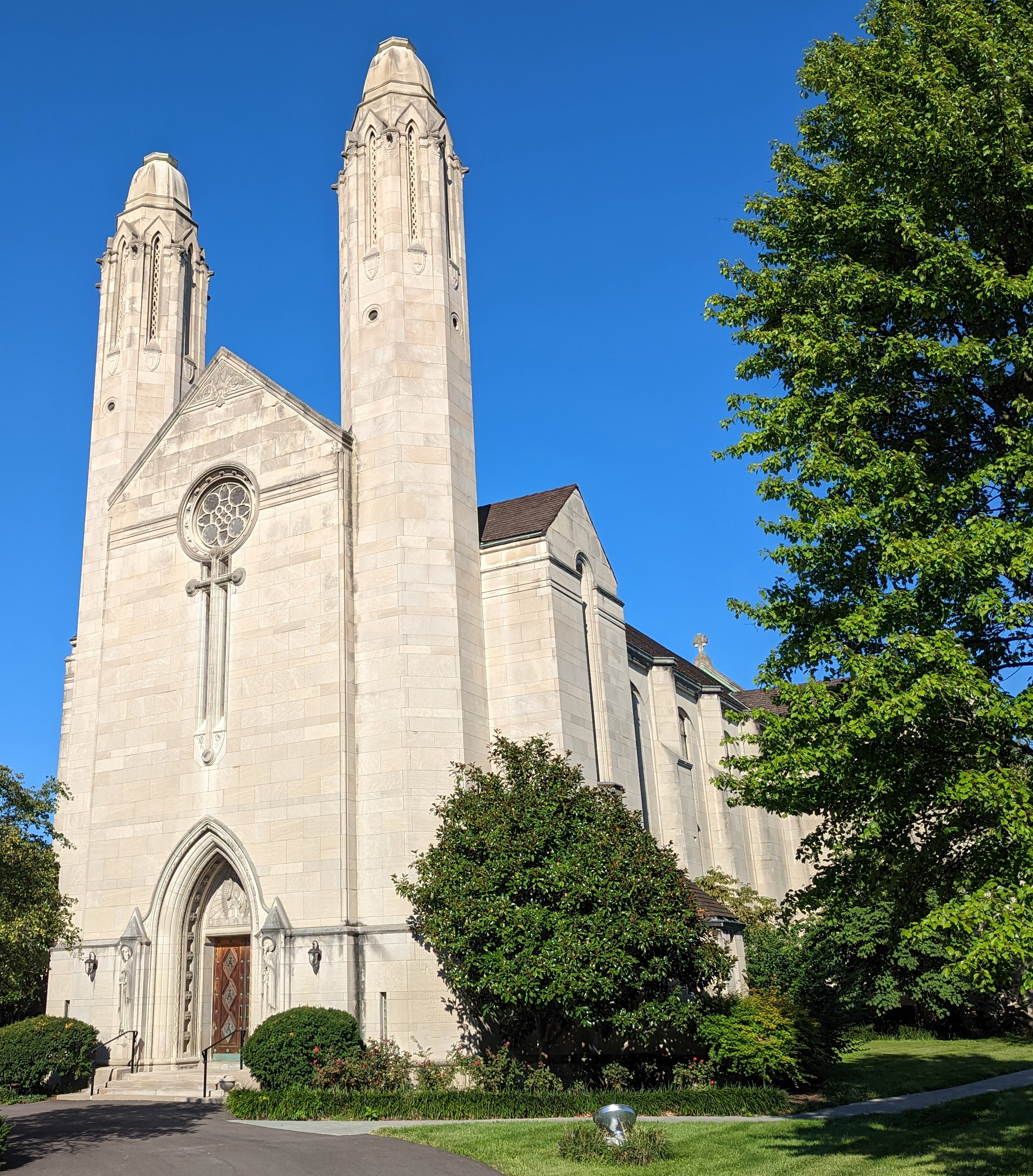
Holy Trinity Church
(Formerly Saints Peter and Paul)
Norwood, Ohio

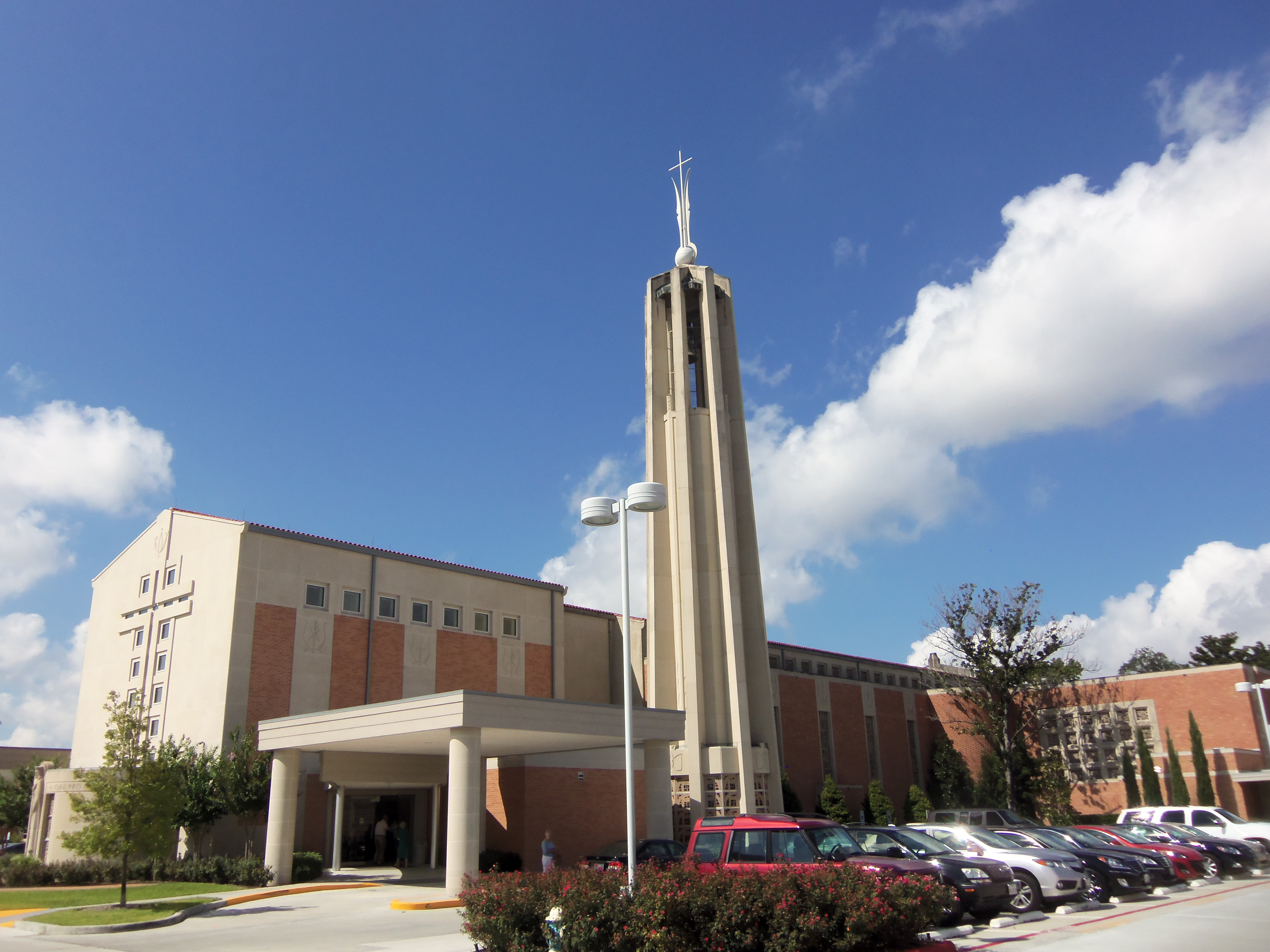
St. Michael Church
Houston, Texas

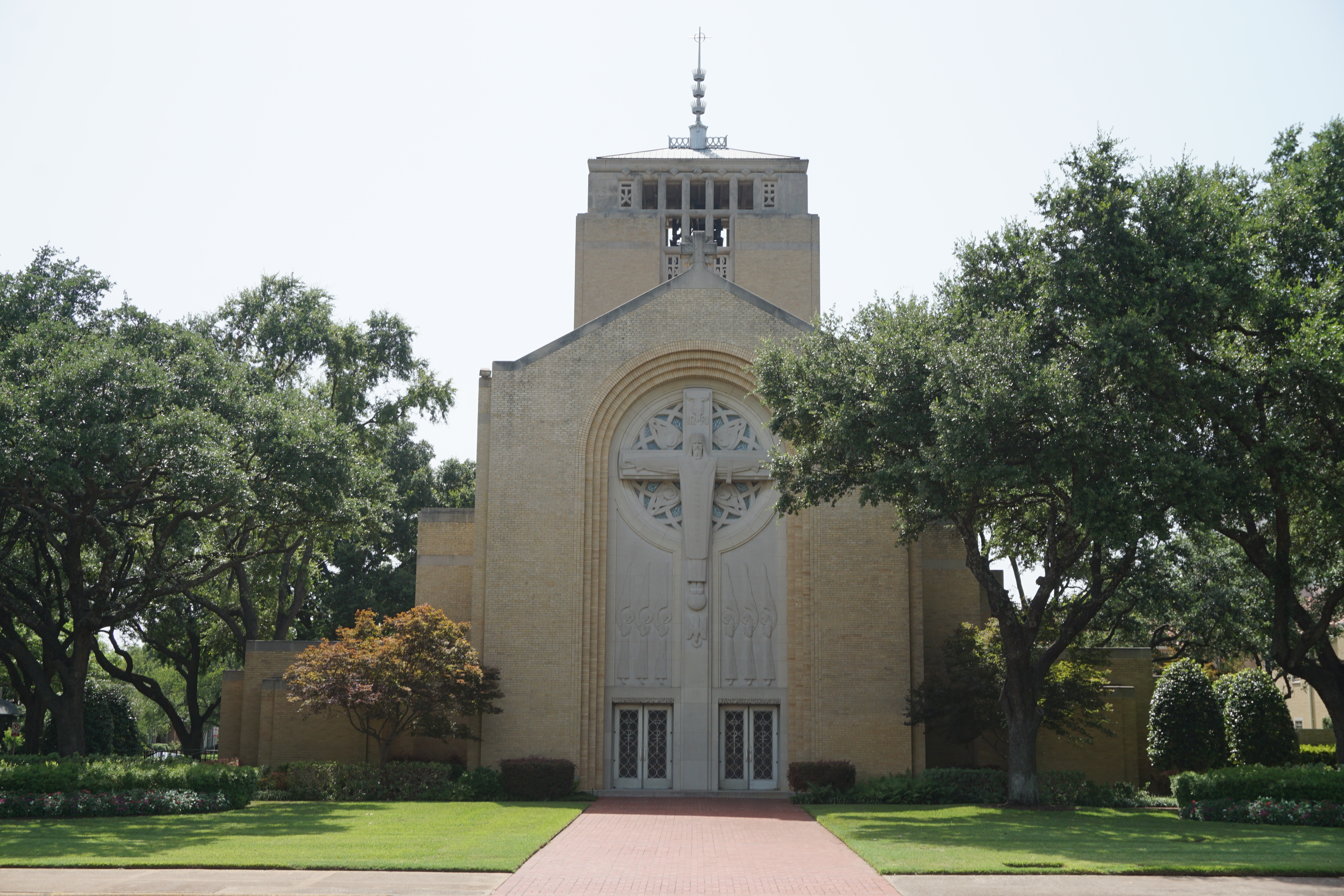
Christ the King Church
University Park, Texas

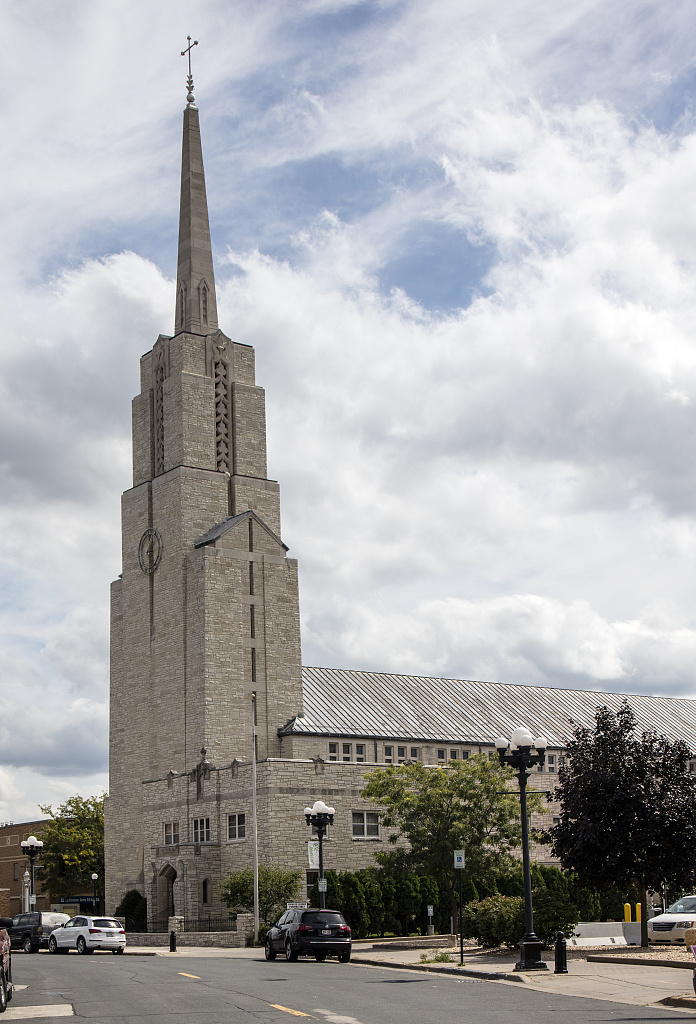
Cathedral of Saint Joseph the Workman
La Crosse, Wisconsin

Saint Thomas, Fort Thomas, KY

== Publications ==
- The Cathedral (1956)
- The Lord Was My Client (1972)

== Notes ==
1.The current Church of St. Monica (combined with the once nearby parish of St. George) superseded Old St. Peter's as the Catholic Cathedral in Cincinnati for a time terminating in 1957. This arrangement was originally not intended to be a temporary measure, hence it can neither be styled as a pro-cathedral nor a proto-cathedral (the cathedral status has been returned to the very church St. Monica inherited it from).

== Other references ==
- Edward J. Schulte and American Church Architecture of the Twentieth Century, Donald A. Tenoever, master's thesis, University of Cincinnati, 1974
- McNamera, Denis (lecturer) (October 6, 2012). God was his client, the Cathedral his church (Video). La Crosse, WI: Cathedral of St. Joseph the Workman Parish. Event occurs at 18:34:40 EDT.
