= Saint-Pal-de-Mons =

Saint Pal de Mons
- Commune
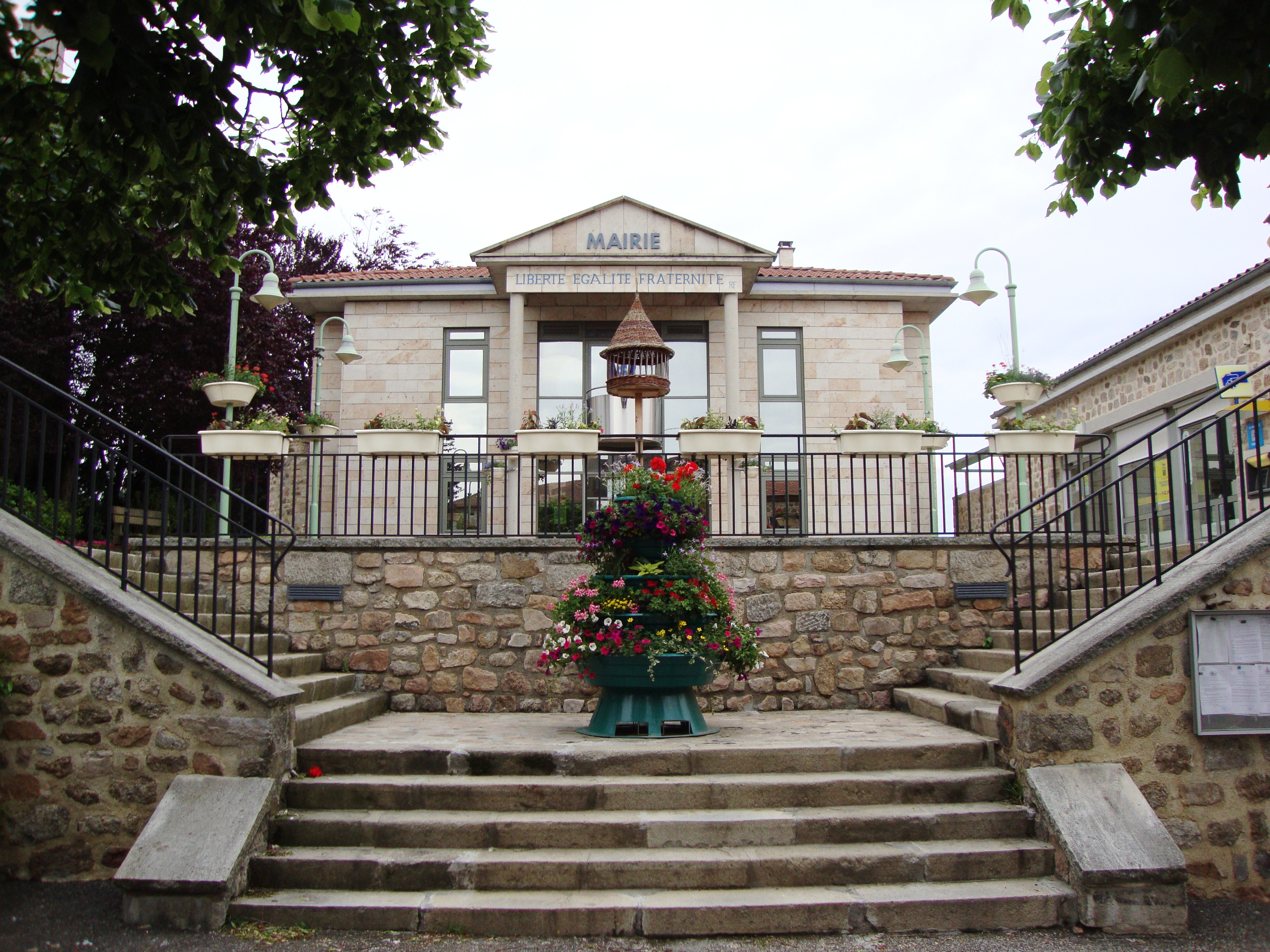
- Town hall

- Coat of arms
- Location of Saint Pal de Mons
- Location within France Location within Auvergne-Rhône-Alpes
- Coordinates: 45°14′50″N 4°16′30″E
- Country: France
- Region: Auvergne-Rhône-Alpes
- Department: Haute-Loire
- Arrondissement: Yssingeaux
- Canton: Deux Rivières et Vallées

Government
  - Mayor (2020–2026): Patrick Riffard
- Area^{1}: 27.11 km^{2} (10.47 sq mi)
- Elevation: 842 m (2,762 ft)
- Highest elevation: 969 m (3,179 ft)
- Lowest elevation: 615 m (2,018 ft)
- Population (2023): 2,358
  - Density: 86.98/km^{2} (225.3/sq mi)
- Time zone: UTC+01:00 (CET)
  - Summer (DST): UTC+02:00 (CEST)
- INSEE/Postal code: 43213 /43620
- ^{1} French Land Register data, which excludes lakes, ponds, glaciers > 1 km^{2} (0.386 sq mi or 247 acres) and river estuaries.

Saint-Pal-de-Mons (French pronunciation: [sɛ̃ pal də mɔ̃]; Occitan: Sent Pal de Mons) is a commune in the Haute-Loire department in south-central France.

== Population ==
Historical population

Year	Pop.	±% p.a.
1793	1,460	—
1821	1,693	+0.53%
1846	2,100	+0.87%
1872	2,044	−0.10%
1901	2,509	+0.71%
1926	2,519	+0.02%
1946	1,682	−2.00%
1962	1,521	−0.63%
1968	1,416	−1.19%

Year	Pop.	±% p.a.
1975	1,365	−0.52%
1982	1,423	+0.60%
1990	1,542	+1.01%
1999	1,748	+1.40%
2007	1,991	+1.64%
2012	2,173	+1.76%
2017	2,281	+0.97%
2023	2,358	+0.55%

Source: EHESS and INSEE (1968–2023)

== Personalities ==
- Paul Durieu (1830–1899), first Bishop of New Westminster in British Columbia, Canada

== See also ==
- Communes of the Haute-Loire department
