= John Patrick Treacy =

American prelate

His Excellency, The Most Reverend John Patrick Treacy
- Bishop of La Crosse; Titular Bishop of Metelis
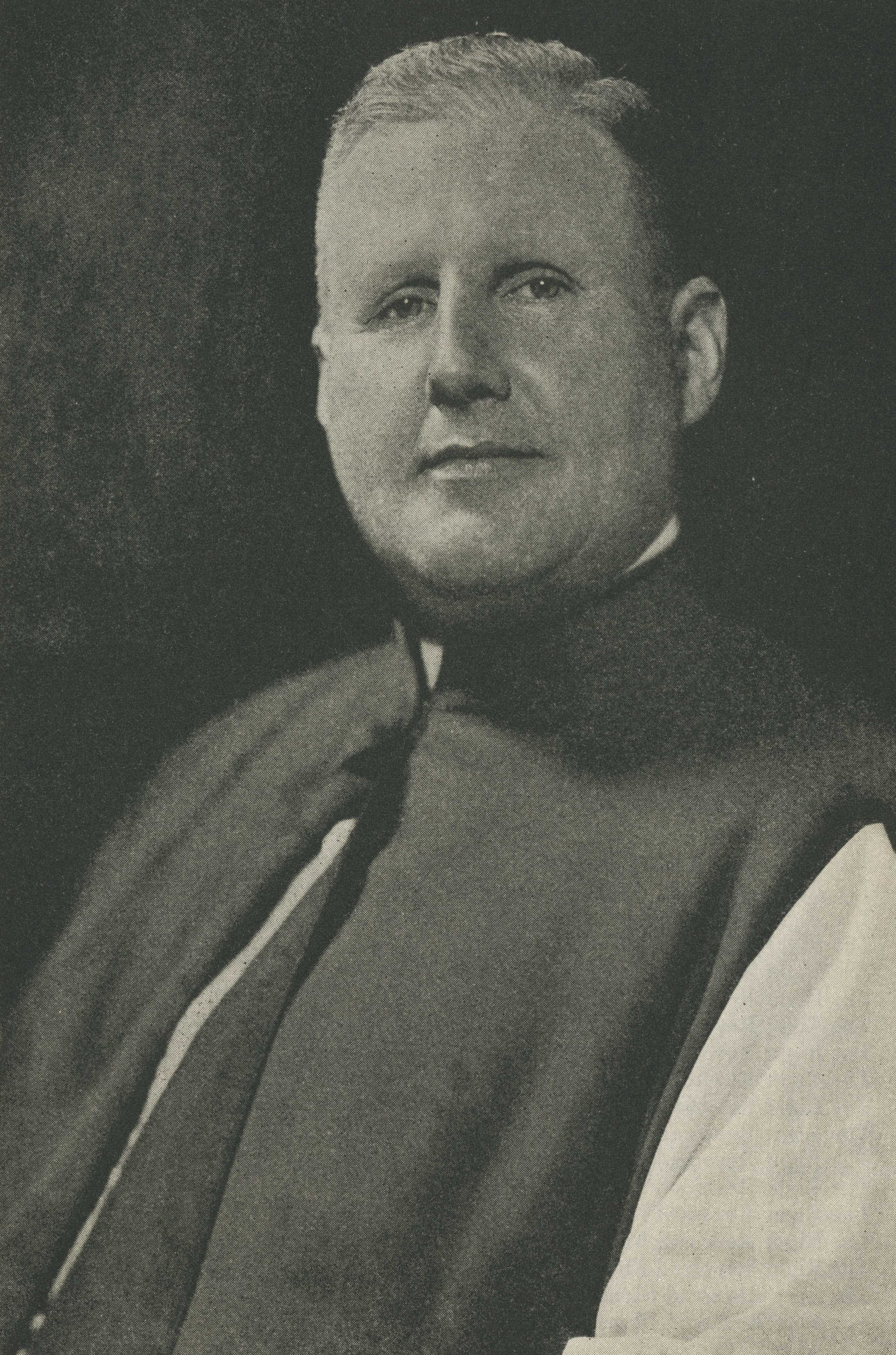
- Church: Roman Catholic Church
- See: Diocese of La Crosse
- Predecessor: Alexander Joseph McGavick
- Successor: Frederick William Freking
- Other post: Titular Bishop of Metelis

Orders
- Ordination: December 8, 1918
- Consecration: October 2, 1945 by Amleto Giovanni Cicognani

Personal details
- Born: July 23, 1891 Marlborough, Massachusetts, U.S.
- Died: October 11, 1964 (aged 73) La Crosse, Wisconsin, U.S.
- Education: College of the Holy Cross (BA); Harvard University (LLB); Catholic University of America (STL); St. John's Seminary (BPhil)

Styles of John Patrick Treacy
- Reference style: The Most Reverend
- Spoken style: Your Excellency
- Religious style: Monsignor
- Posthumous style: none

John Patrick Treacy (July 23, 1891 – October 11, 1964) was an American lawyer and prelate of the Roman Catholic Church who was bishop of the Diocese of La Crosse in Wisconsin from 1948 until his death in 1964.

== Biography ==
=== Early life and education ===
Treacy was born on July 23, 1891, in Marlborough, Massachusetts, the only child of John and Ann (née O'Kane) Treacy. He attended the College of the Holy Cross in Worcester, Massachusetts, and studied at Harvard Law School before enrolling at the Catholic University of America in Washington, D.C. Following his graduation from the Catholic University in 1912, Treacy returned to Massachusetts and studied at St. John's Seminary in Boston.

=== Priesthood and ministry ===
Treacy was ordained to the priesthood for the Diocese of Cleveland, Ohio, on December 8, 1918.

After 12 years in parish work, Treacy became diocesan director of the Society for the Propagation of the Faith in 1931. He was promoted to a domestic prelate by Pope Pius XI in 1934. In 1939, he was named by US President Franklin D. Roosevelt to a 25-member committee for a good-neighbor mission to Latin America.

=== Coadjutor Bishop and Bishop of La Crosse ===
On August 22, 1945, Treacy was appointed coadjutor bishop of the Diocese of La Crosse and titular bishop of Metelis by Pope Pius XII. He received his episcopal consecration on October 2. 1945.

Upon the death of Alexander McGavick, Treacy succeeded him as the fifth bishop of La Crosse on August 25, 1948. During his 16-year tenure, he founded Holy Cross Seminary, oversaw the construction of the Cathedral of Saint Joseph the Workman in La Crosse, and established 47 churches, 43 convents, and 42 schools. He also ordered the closing of the Necedah Shrine of Mary Van Hoof in Necedah, Wisconsin, in 1950. Van Hoof said she experienced religious visions, which the Vatican said was not true. He attended the first two sessions of the Second Vatican Council in Rome between 1962 and 1963.

Treacy died on October 11, 1964, at St. Francis Hospital in La Crosse.

== See also ==
- Catholic Church hierarchy
- Catholic Church in the United States
- Historical list of the Catholic bishops of the United States
- List of Catholic bishops of the United States
- Lists of patriarchs, archbishops, and bishops

Catholic Church titles
Preceded by Alexander Joseph McGavick	Bishop of La Crosse; 1948–1964	Succeeded by Frederick William Freking
Preceded by –	Coadjutor Bishop of La Crosse; 1945–1948	Succeeded by –
