= Cathedral of Saint Joseph the Workman =

Church in La Crosse, Wisconsin, United States

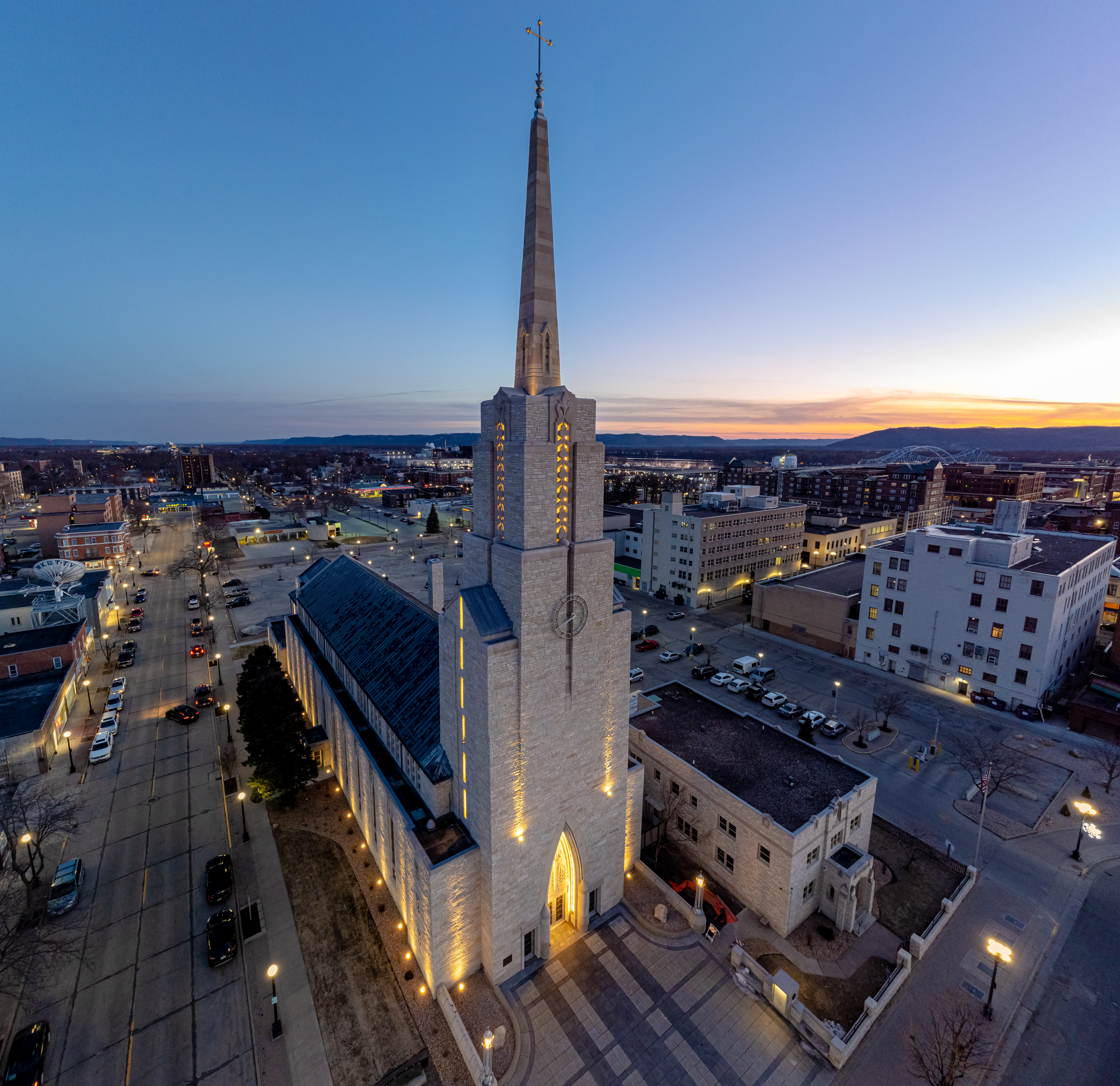

- Location in Wisconsin Cathedral of Saint Joseph the Workman (the United States)
- 43°48′40″N 91°14′55″W
- Location: 530 Main St. La Crosse, Wisconsin
- Country: United States
- Denomination: Roman Catholic
- Website: www.cathedralsjworkman.org

History
- Status: Cathedral
- Founded: 1863
- Founder: Rev. C. J. F. Schraudenbach
- Dedication: May 14, 1962

Architecture
- Architect: Edward J. Schulte
- Style: Late art déco, gothic Revival
- Completed: 1962

Specifications
- Materials: Limestone

Administration
- Diocese: Diocese of LaCrosse

Clergy
- Bishop: Most Rev. Gerard William Battersby
- Rector: Msgr. Richard Gilles

The Cathedral of St. Joseph the Workman is the mother church of the Diocese of La Crosse. The cathedral, designed by architect Edward J. Schulte, was completed in 1962. Built of limestone, it has a tall clock tower which rises above the surrounding buildings in downtown La Crosse, Wisconsin.

In 2008, the cathedral undertook a six-week project to repair the steeple. In March 2021, the cathedral began another program to repair the steeple which began to drop stones in summer 2020. The renovations addressed several problem areas of the structure, as well as refurbish the interior of the building. The projects were complete in June, 2023, followed by a September 2023 celebration.

The following Bishops of the Diocese of La Crosse are buried in the Blessed Sacrament Chapel:

- Kilian Caspar Flasch
- James Schwebach
- Alexander Joseph McGavick, founder of Aquinas High School-La Crosse, Wisconsin
- John Patrick Treacy, the builder of the new cathedral
- Frederick William Freking
- John Joseph Paul

Bishop Michael Heiss is buried in Milwaukee and Auxiliary Bishop William Richard Griffin is buried in Chicago.

== Gallery ==
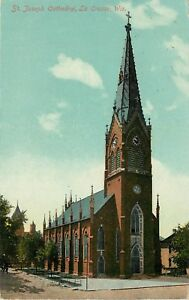
Old St. Joseph Cathedral

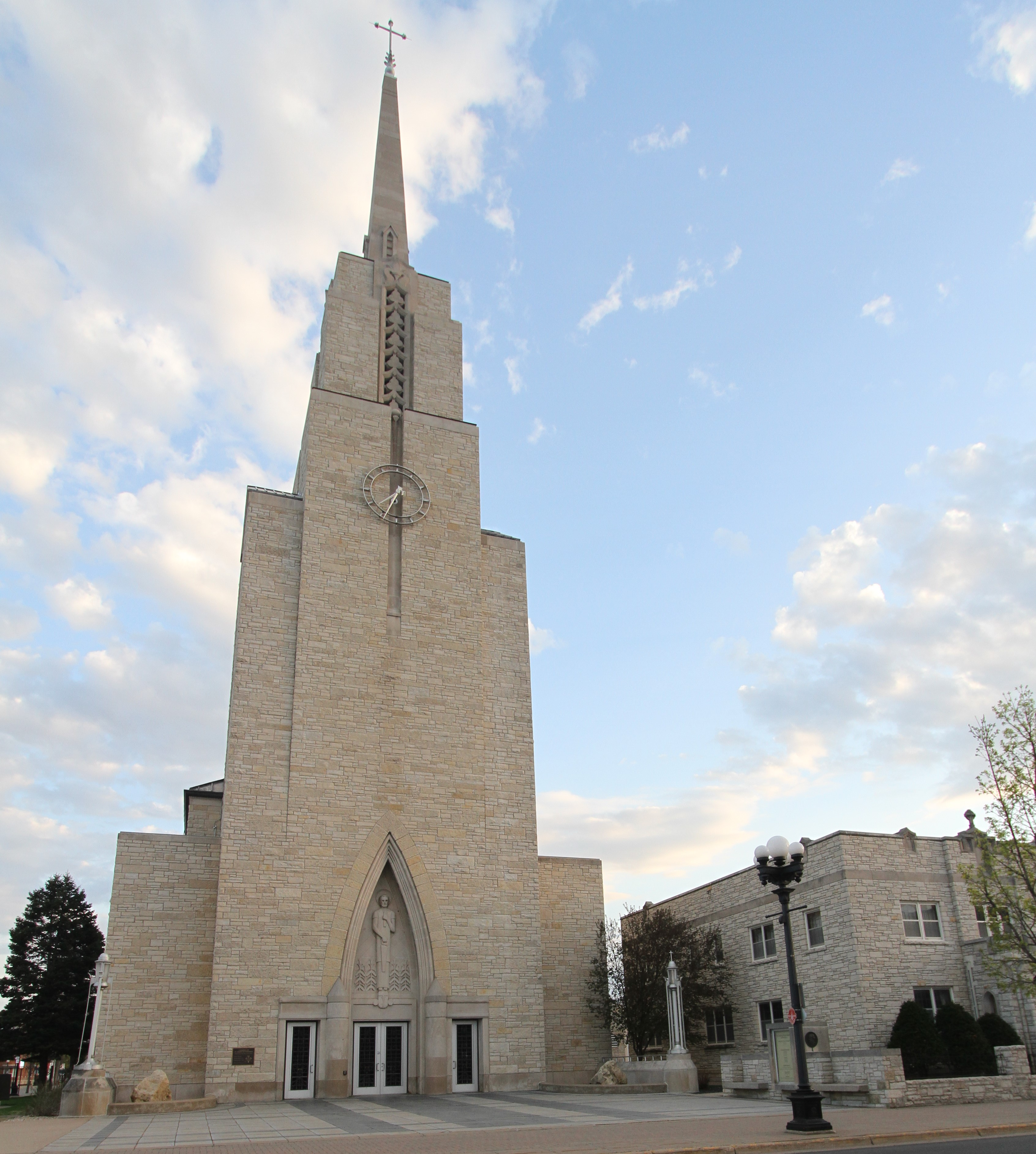
North facade

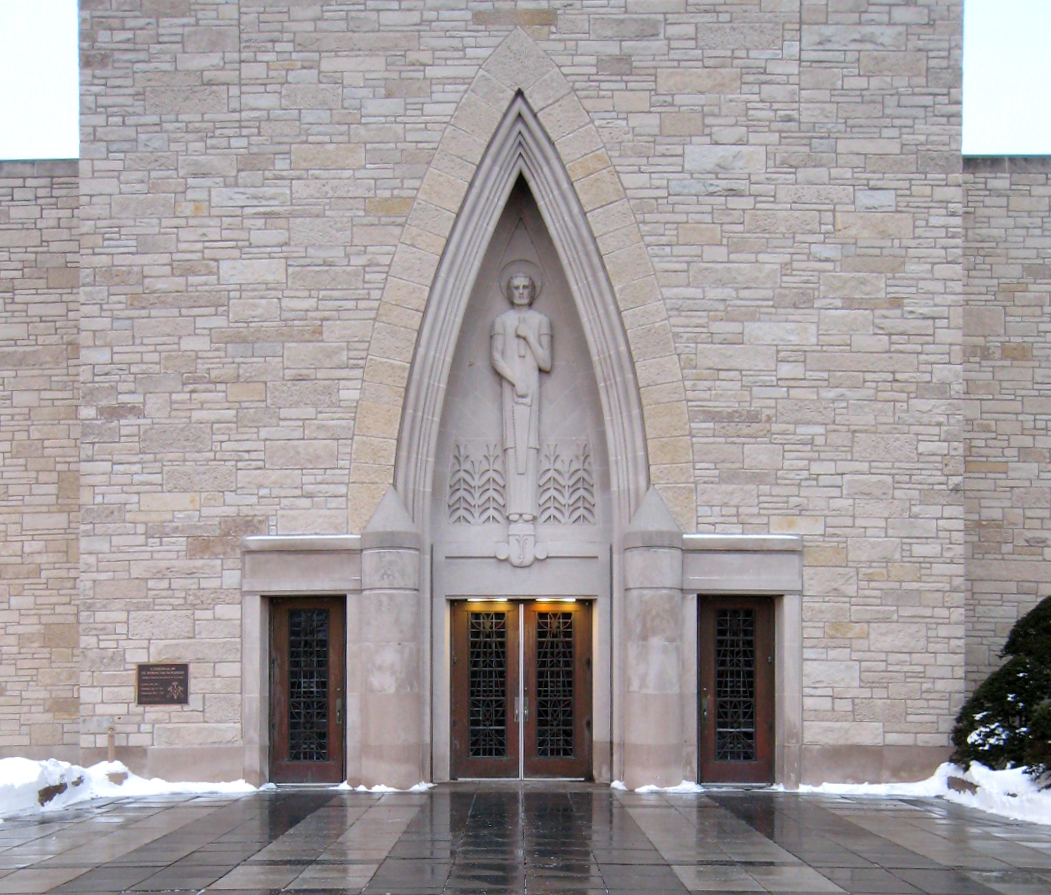
Entry detail

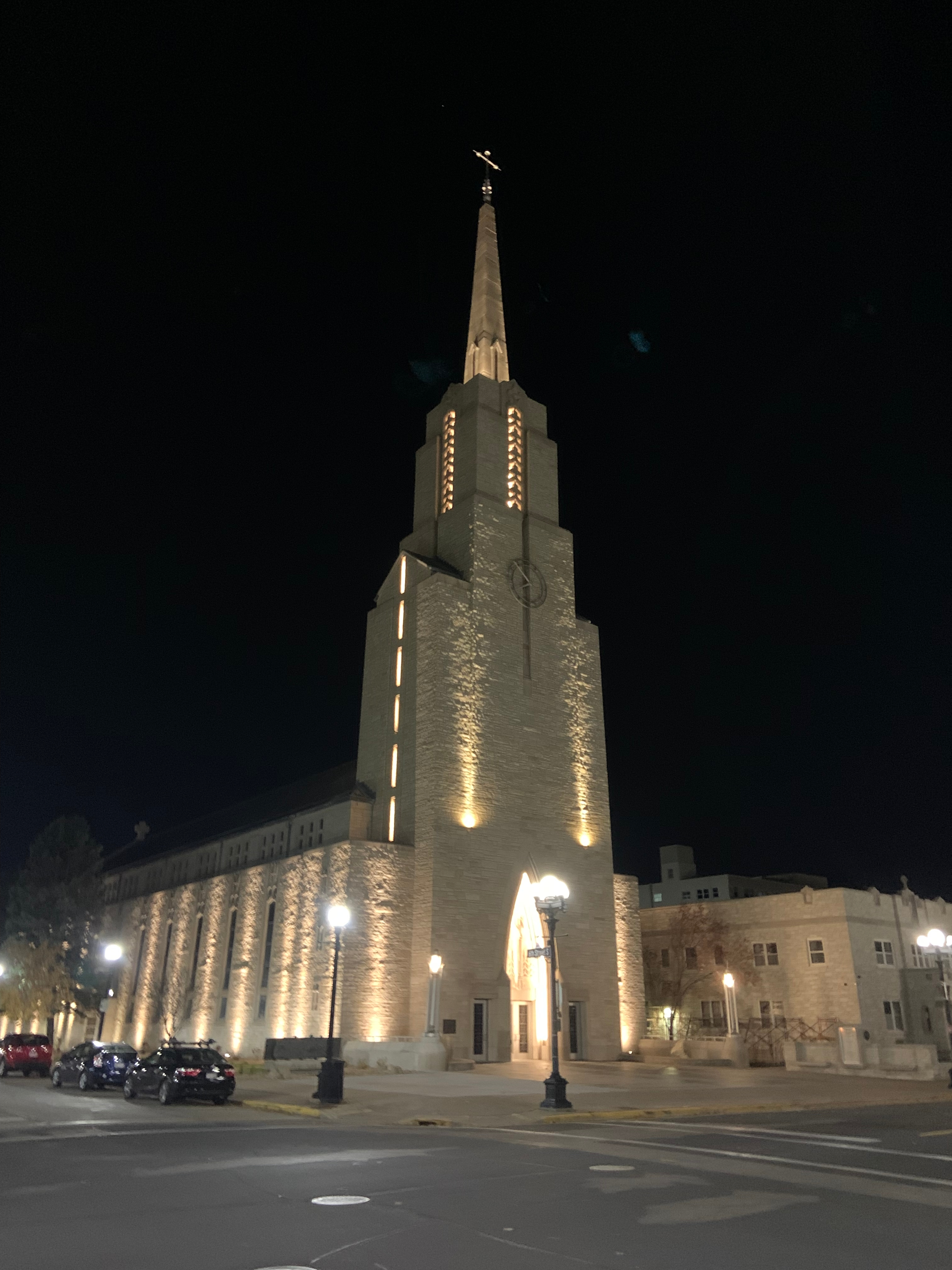
La Crosse Cathedral at night

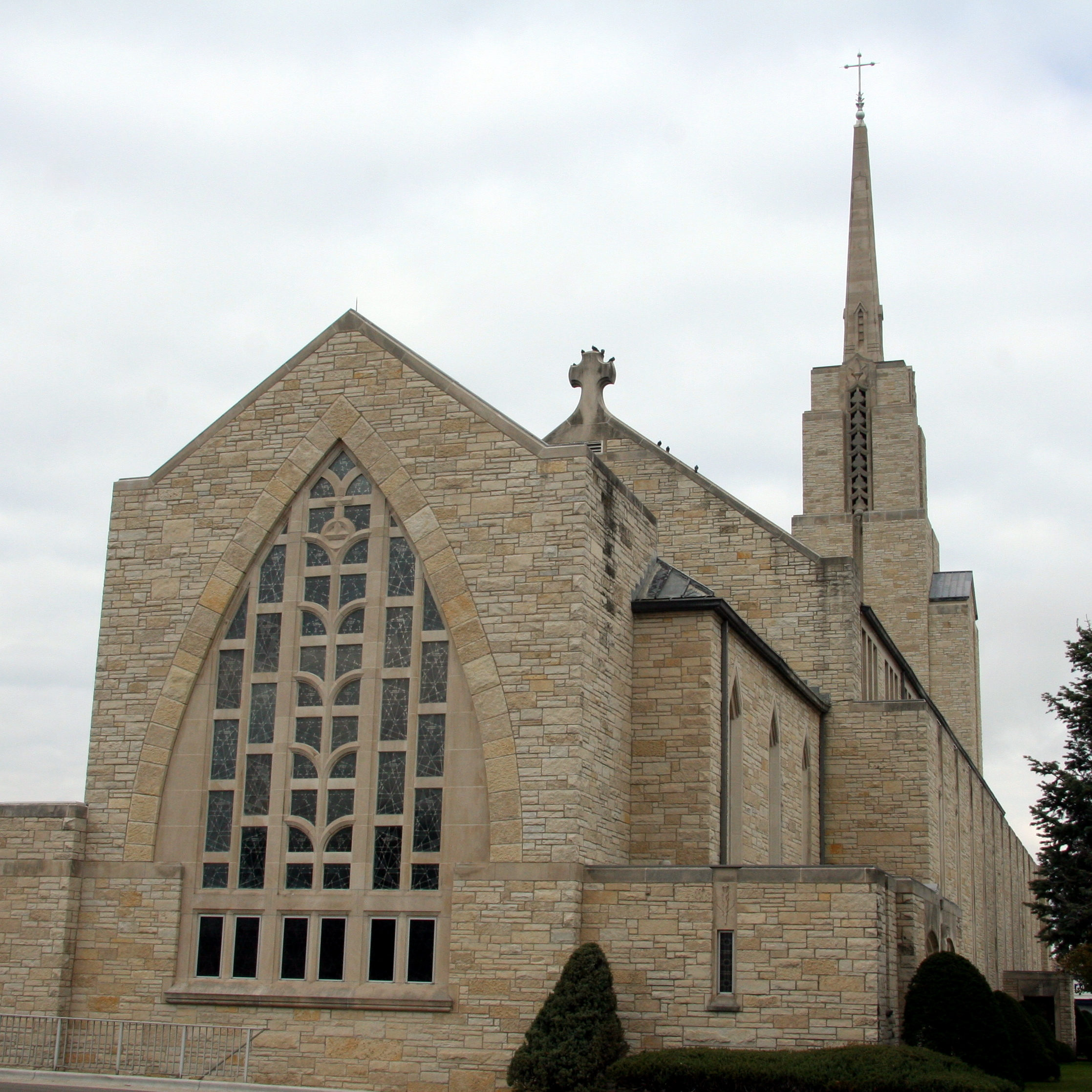

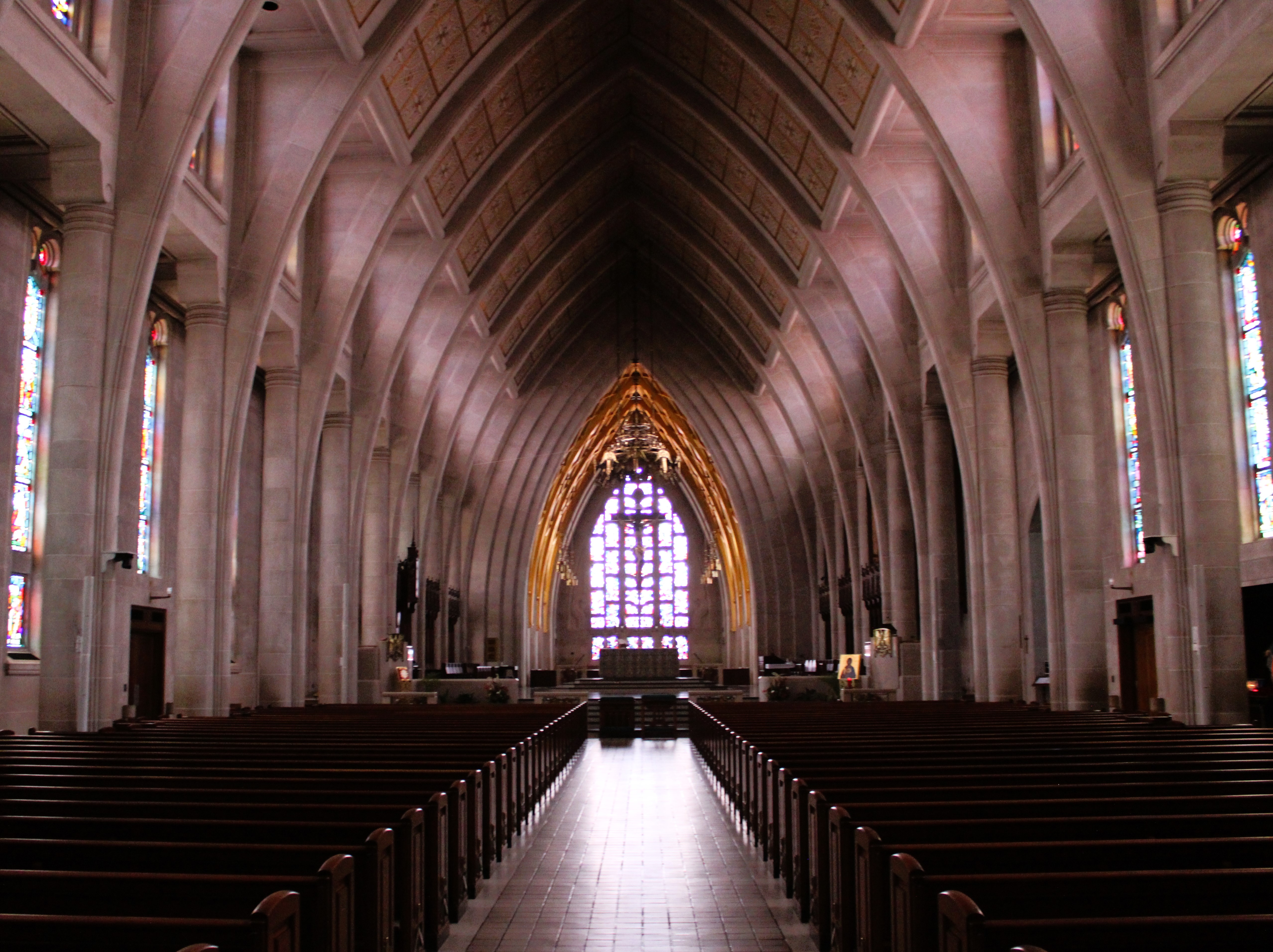
Cathedral interior

== See also ==
- List of Catholic cathedrals in the United States
- List of cathedrals in the United States
- Shrine of Our Lady of Guadalupe
