= Augustin Dontenwill =

Canadian Roman Catholic archbishop

Most Rev. Augustin Dontenwill
- Archbishop of Vancouver
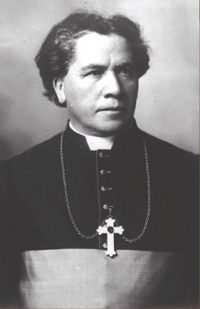
- Motto: Pax In Veritate
- Province: British Columbia
- Diocese: Archdiocese of Vancouver
- Installed: 1899
- Term ended: 1908
- Predecessor: Paul Durieu
- Successor: Neil McNeil
- Other post: Superior General of Oblates of Mary Immaculate (1908)

Orders
- Ordination: 1885 - Priest
- Consecration: 1897 - Bishop

Personal details
- Born: Augustin Dontenwill; June 4, 1857 Bischwiller, France
- Died: November 30, 1931 (aged 74) New Westminster, British Columbia, Canada
- Denomination: Roman Catholic
- Education: University of Ottawa

Augustin Dontenwill (June 4, 1857 – November 30, 1931) was the Roman Catholic Oblates of Mary Immaculate (OMI) priest, who became Archbishop of Vancouver, British Columbia, Canada, from 1899 to 1908.

== Curriculum vitae ==
Augustin Dontenwill was born on June 4, 1857, in Bischwiller, Alsace, France; where he came to the United States, as a child.

=== Ordination ===
In 1885, Augustin Dontenwill became an Oblates of Mary Immaculate priest.

=== Consecration ===
In 1897, Dontenwill became consecrated as bishop and came to New Westminster to become Coadjutor Bishop of New Westminster and by 1899, he became Bishop of New Westminster. In 1908 he resigned as Bishop of New Westminster, to take charge as Superior General of the Oblates of Mary Immaculate.

Dontenwill died on November 30, 1931, as Bishop Emeritus of New Westminster.

== Legacy ==
- Founder of the Holy Rosary church, in Vancouver, British Columbia, Canada (which is known today as Holy Rosary Cathedral).

== Service to God ==
- Priest for 47 years
- Bishop for 34 years

== Notes ==
In 1908, there was a name change, from Bishop of New Westminster, to Archbishop of Vancouver (the diocese was raised to an archdiocese).

Catholic Church titles
Preceded by Paul Durieu	Bishop of New Westminster; 1899–1908	Succeeded by Neil McNeil
Preceded by	Superior General of Oblates of Mary Immaculate; 1908–1931	Succeeded by
