= Cathedral of Christ the King (Lexington, Kentucky) =

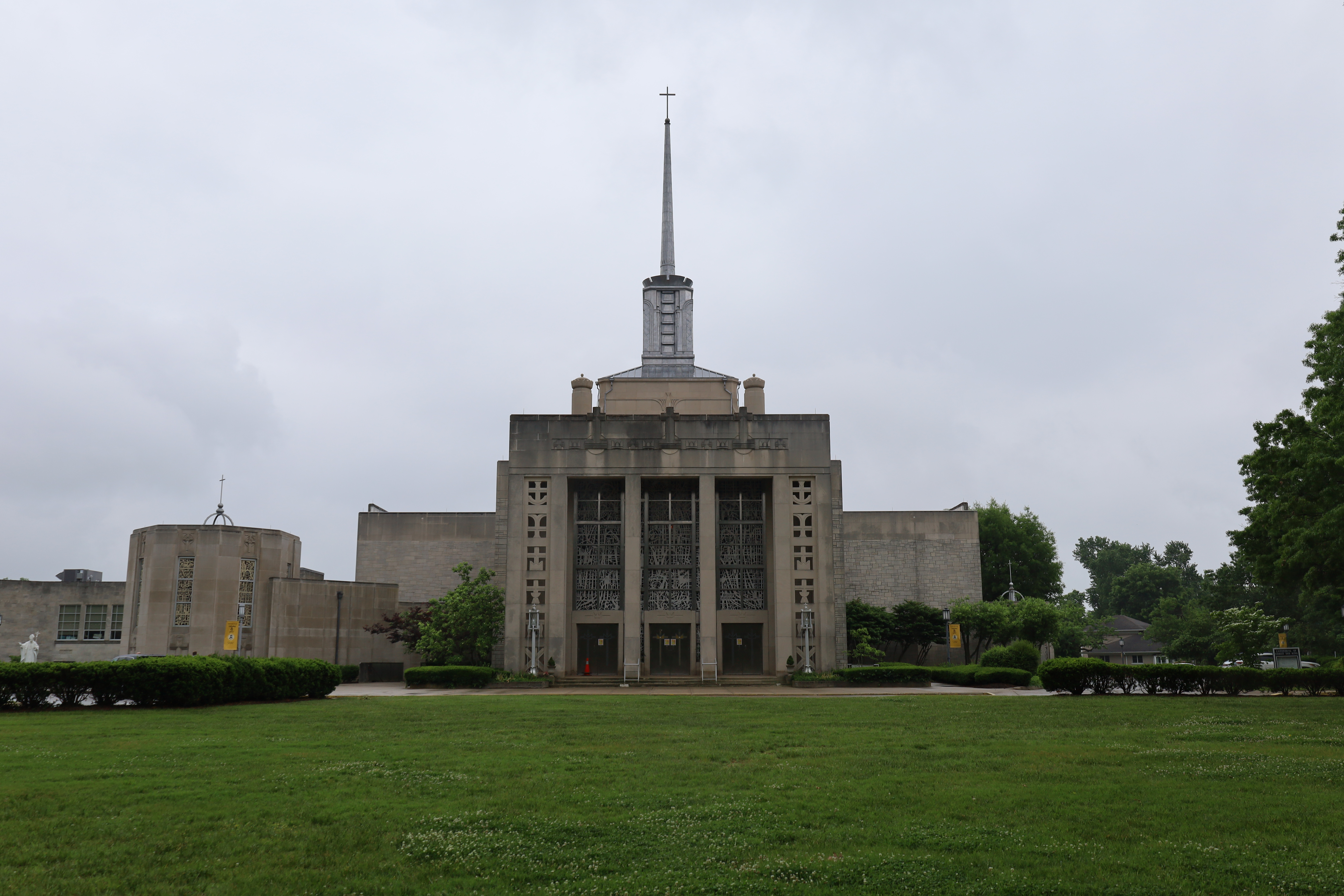
- The cathedral in 2022

- Location in Kentucky Cathedral of Christ the King (the United States)
- 38°01′21″N 84°29′15″W
- Location: 299 Colony Blvd. Lexington, Kentucky
- Country: United States
- Denomination: Roman Catholic Church
- Website: www.cathedralctk.org

History
- Founded: July 22, 1945

Architecture
- Architect: Edward J. Schulte
- Style: Modern and late Art Deco
- Completed: 1967
- Construction cost: $1.5 million

Administration
- Diocese: Lexington

Clergy
- Bishop: Most Rev. John Stowe
- Rector: Rev. Paul Prabell

The Cathedral of Christ the King is a Roman Catholic cathedral located in Lexington, Kentucky, in the United States. It is the seat of the Diocese of Lexington.

== History ==
=== Christ the King Church ===
Christ the King Parish was established in the Diocese of Covington on July 22, 1945. Initially, Mass and other parish functions were held in the chapel at St. Catherine's Academy. The Rev. George J. O'Brien was named the parish's first pastor but had to resign soon after because of ill health, being replaced by the Rev. Richard O'Neill.

The parish moved to its current site on May 12, 1946, with parish functions held in a pre-fabricated structure. Christ the King School was opened in 1951 and the Sisters of Divine Providence formed the initial faculty. The present church and rectory were built in the Modern and Art Deco architectural styles from 1965 to 1967 for $1.5 million.

=== Cathedral of Christ the King ===
On January 14, 1988 Pope John Paul II established the Diocese of Lexington, and Christ the King became the cathedral for the new diocese. The Cathedral Center was added to the parish facilities in 1992.

Like many other Catholic parishes during the COVID-19 pandemic, the cathedral rector was forced to limit how and when the sacrament of confession was exercised.

== Gallery ==
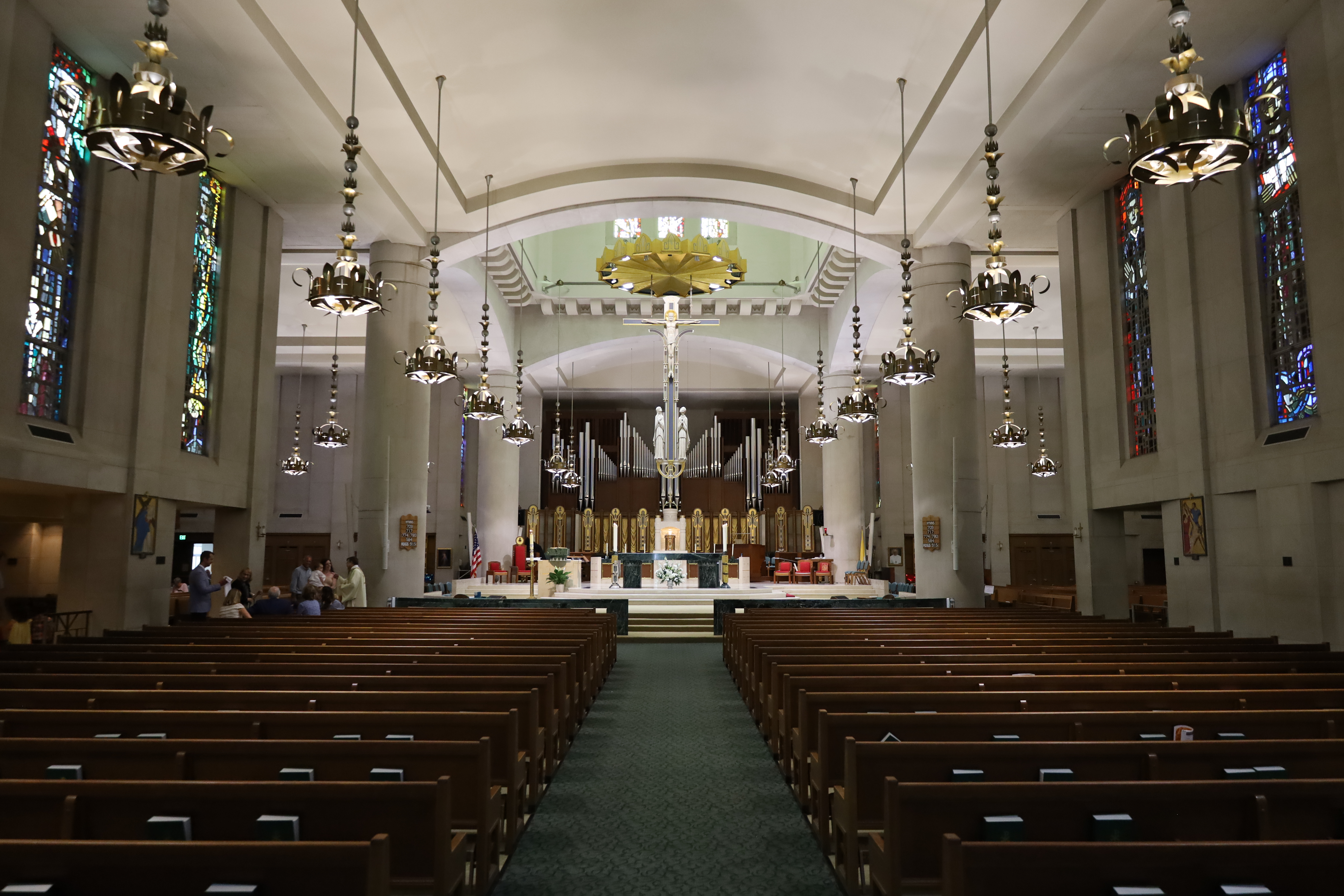
Nave and main altar (2019)

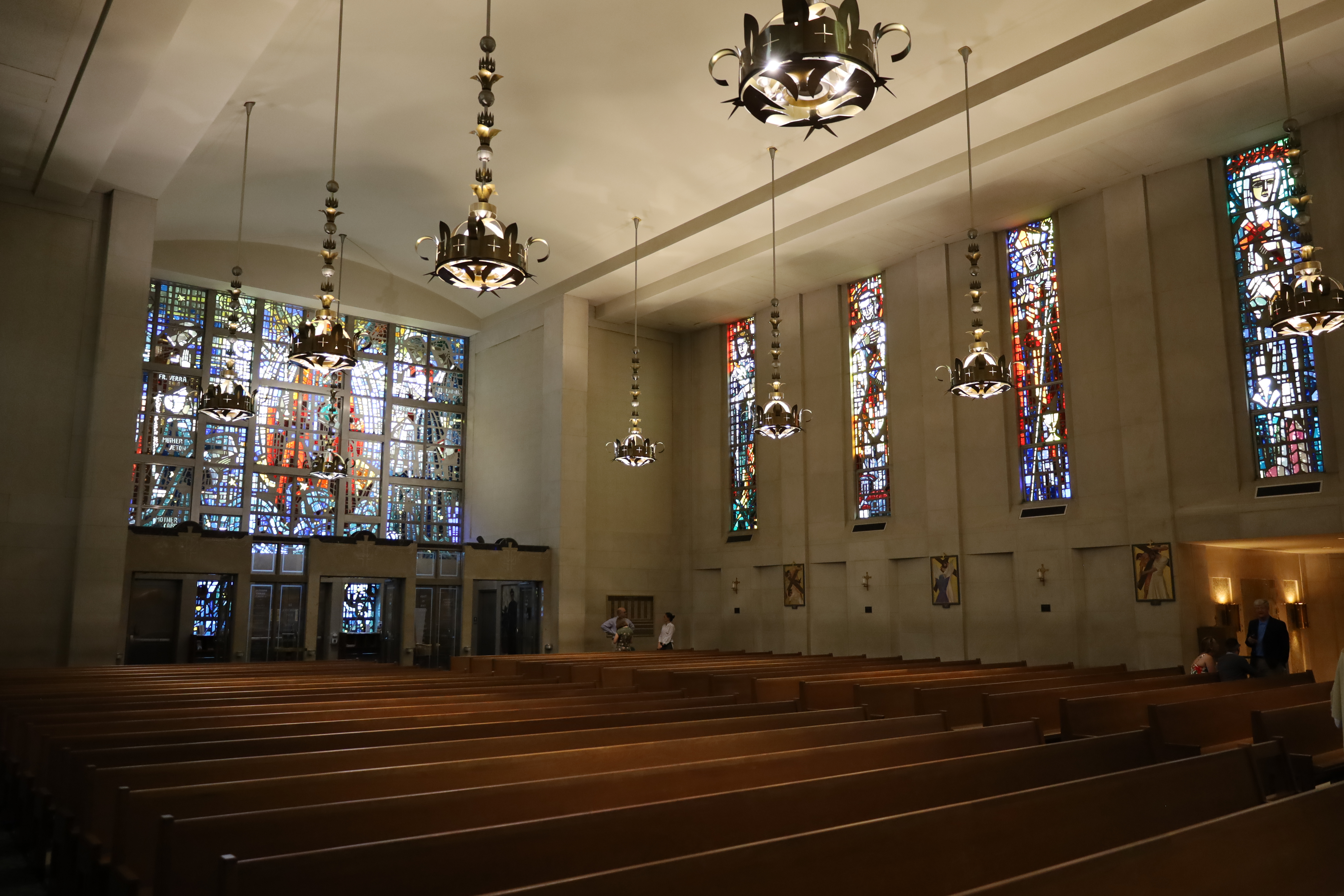
Nave and stained glass windows (2022)

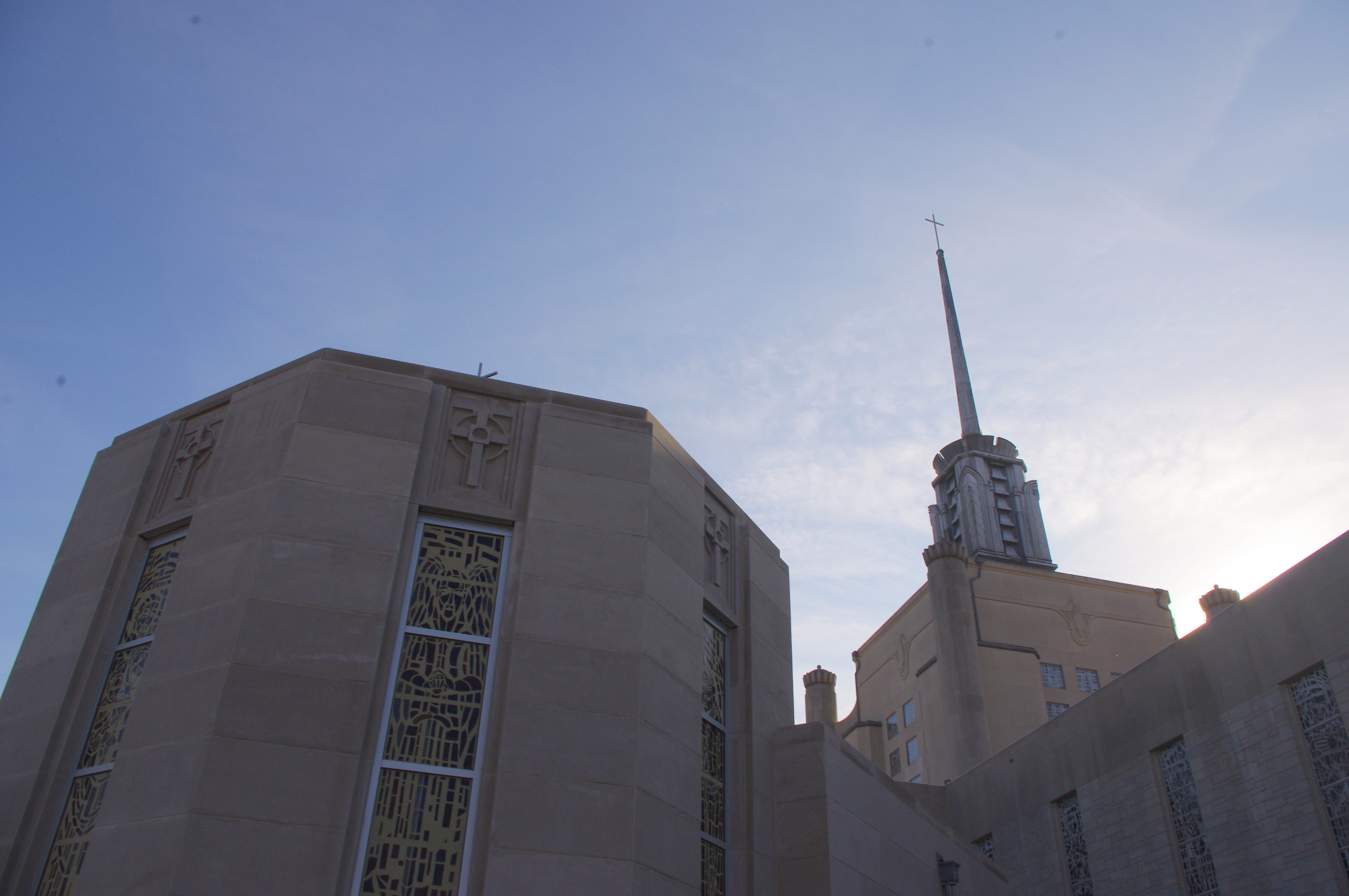
Chapel and spire (2012)

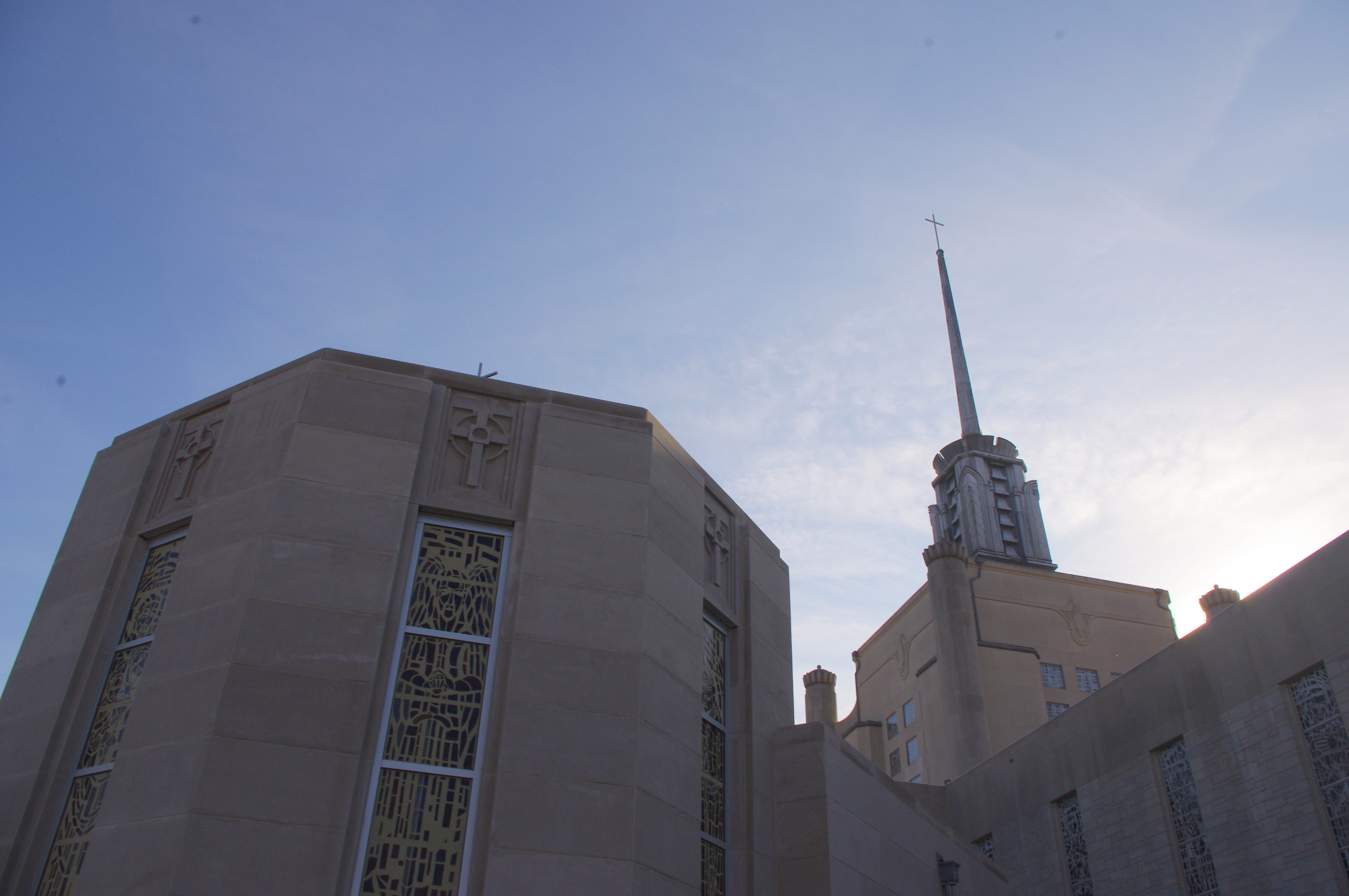
Exterior chapel and spire

== See also ==
- List of Catholic cathedrals in the United States
- List of cathedrals in the United States
