= Louis-Joseph d'Herbomez =

Canadian Roman Catholic priest

Rt. Rev. Louis-Joseph d'Herbomez
- Bishop of New Westminster
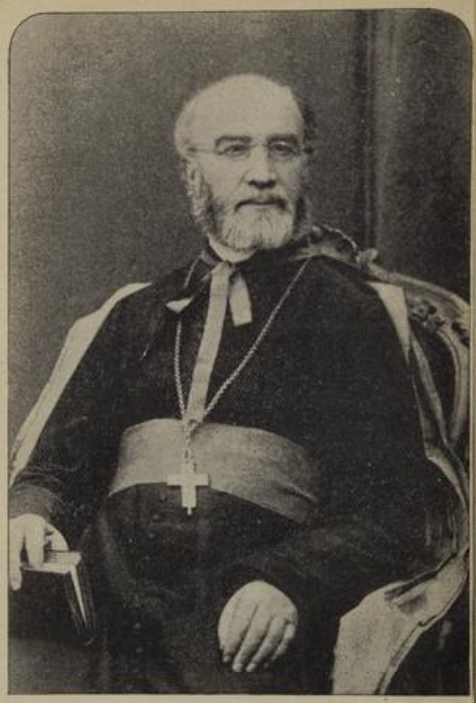
- Motto: Si Deus Est Pro Nobis Quis Contra Nos
- Province: British Columbia
- Diocese: Archdiocese of Vancouver
- Installed: 1864
- Term ended: 1890
- Predecessor: none
- Successor: Paul Durieu
- Other post: First Vatican Council: Council Father

Orders
- Ordination: 1849 - Priest
- Consecration: 1864 - Bishop

Personal details
- Born: Louis-Joseph D'Herbomez; January 17, 1822 Brillon, France
- Died: June 3, 1890 (aged 68) New Westminster, Canada
- Denomination: Roman Catholic

Louis-Joseph d'Herbomez (January 17, 1822 – June 3, 1890) was a Canadian Roman Catholic priest, Vicar Apostolic of British Columbia, and Titular Bishop of Miletopolis from 1863 to 1890.

== Curriculum Vitae ==
Louis-Joseph d'Herbomez was born on January 17, 1822, in Brillon, France.

=== Ordination ===
In 1849, Louis-Joseph d'Herbomez became a Roman Catholic priest of Oblates of Mary Immaculate (OMI). He joined the Oregon Missions in 1850 and by 1858 became Vicar of Missions for Vancouver Island and then, in 1864, for New Westminster.

=== Consecration ===
In 1863, Louis-Joseph d'Herbomez became the first Vicar Apostolic of British Columbia. In 1864, d'Herbomez became Bishop of the Roman Catholic Diocese of New Westminster (later to become the Archdiocese of Vancouver).

Louis-Joseph d'Herbomez died on June 3, 1890, in New Westminster, British Columbia, Canada.

== Legacy ==
Credited with being the first Bishop of the Archdiocese of Vancouver.

In 1862, d'Herbomez purchased land on the Fraser River in what is now the District of Mission, which gets its name from a mission school founded on those lands in the 1880s. A creek flowing through those lands, which are now the Pekw'Xe:yles Indian reserve and the adjoining Fraser Valley Heritage Park, was named D'Herbomez Creek in his honour in 1952. A rock outcrop in the upper part of that creek's basin reminded him of the rocks at the Shrine of Our Lady of Lourdes in France and he and others would meditate at the site. After his departure for France in 1887, his dream of building a shrine to the Virgin was fulfilled in 1892 and the first Marian shrine in British Columbia was built on the spot of his meditations. Named the Grotto of Our Lady of Lourdes, it was an eight-sided, domed structure with detachable walls, around which assembled parishioners, most of them First Nations people, would assemble for mass and celebrations, and it was the focus of an annual Passion Play, conducted in the Chinook Jargon, held on the mission grounds. Renovated in 1954 after years of disuse and disrepair, it was nonetheless demolished in 1965 along with the other older buildings of the mission, due to the construction of the newer St. Mary's Indian Residential School, successor to the original St. Mary's Mission. Plans to reconstruct it were launched immediately afterwards by the Mission Heritage Association, who in collaboration with the local chapter of the Knights of Columbus built a reconstruction of the Grotto, opening it in May, 1997.

== Service to God ==
- Priest for 41 years
- Bishop for 26 years

== Notes ==
In 1866, the Colony of British Columbia's capital was New Westminster and the Colony of Vancouver Island's capital was Victoria. The two colonies joined together to become the Colony of British Columbia with the capital in Victoria. In 1871, British Columbia, became the 6th province to join the Confederation of Canada.

Religious titles
| New diocese | Bishop of New Westminster; 1831–1890 | Succeeded by Paul Durieu |
