= Marcopolis =

Marcopolis was a city in the late Roman province of Osrhoene. It is described at the beginning of the 7th century by the geographer George of Cyprus.

== History ==
Siméon Vailhé, writing at the beginning of the 20th century, says that the native name of the city is not known, and that it owes its Greek name to the Emperor Marcus Aurelius (121–180). Writing almost a century later, Maurice Sartre says that "Batnai of Anthemousia" (in Latinized form, Batnae of Anthemusia) was called Marcopolis in honour of the emperor Marcus Antonius Gordianus Pius Augustus (225–244). However, Steven K. Ross points out that Marcopolis and Barnae are listed as distinct episcopal sees in the Notitia Antiochena, showing that they are not the same place, though they may have been close to each other.

The kings of Osrhoene resided at Marcopolis before the 40s of the 3rd century.

The site of this city has not been found, but it may be at Sinjar.

== Bishops ==
Marcopolis was a Christian Bishopric during the Byzantine empire The bishopric of Marcopolis is alluded to in the 6th-century Notitiæ episcopatuum of Antioch as a see of Osrhoene and thus as a suffragan of Edessa, the metropolitan see of that province.

Two of its early bishops are known:.

- Cyrus, who attended the First Council of Ephesus in 431;
- Caioumas, present at the Council of Chalcedon in 451

Eubel mentions four other titulars between 1340 and 1400, and a fifth from 1441 to 1453.

In modern times, Paul Durieu, O.M.I. (1830–1899), a French missionary in British Columbia, Canada, held this title while coadjutor for the apostolic vicariate of New Westminster. The bishopric of Marcopoli survives as only as titular bishopric of the Roman Catholic Church and that office has been vacant since December 5, 1969.
