= Thaddeus J. Butler =

American clergyman (1833–1897)

Thaddeus Joseph Butler
- Bishop-Elect of Concordia
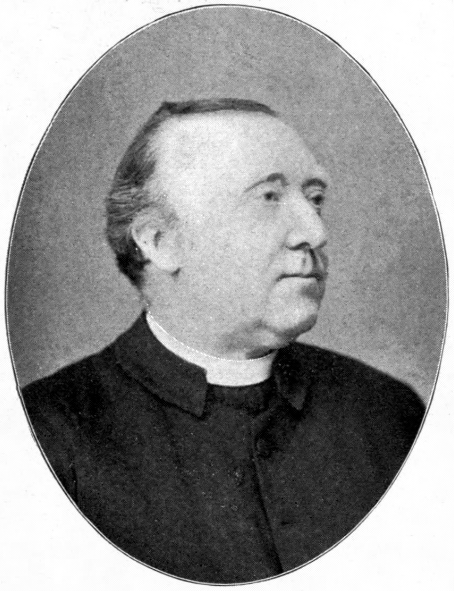
- Church: Catholic Church
- Diocese: Diocese of Concordia
- In office: July 5, 1897 – July 16, 1897
- Predecessor: Richard Scannell
- Successor: John Francis Cunningham

Orders
- Ordination: July 25, 1856 by Antonio Ligi-Bussi

Personal details
- Born: November 1, 1833 Limerick, County Limerick, United Kingdom of Great Britain and Ireland
- Died: July 16, 1897 (aged 63) Rome, Kingdom of Italy
- Buried: Calvary Cemetery
- Education: All Hallows College

Thaddeus Joseph Butler (November 1, 1833 – July 16, 1897) was an American Roman Catholic priest and bishop-elect.

== Biography ==
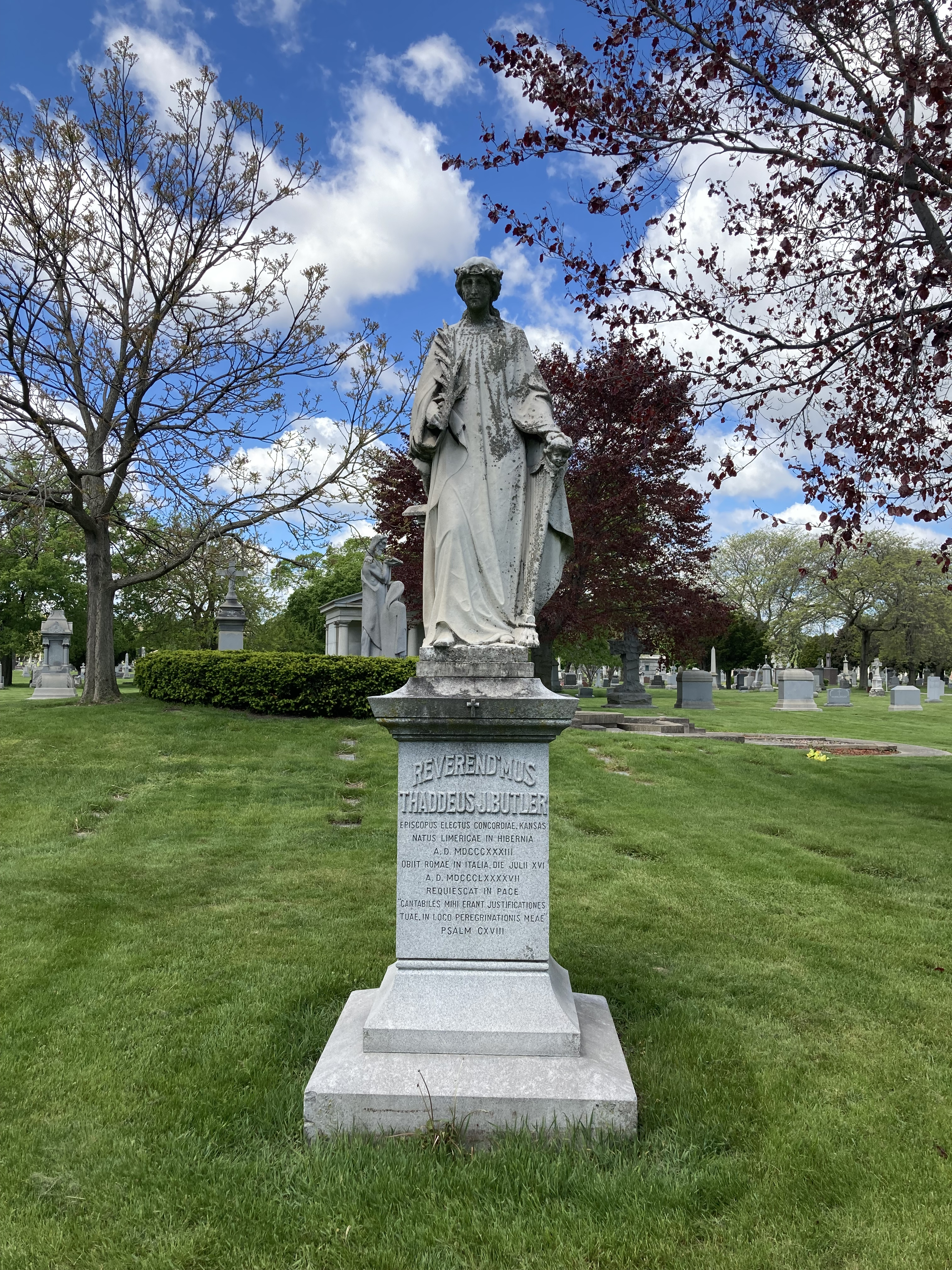
Butler's grave at Calvary Cemetery

Butler was born in Limerick, Ireland. He studied at All Hallows College in Dublin and at the Propaganda College in Rome. He immigrated to the United States and was ordained to the priesthood for the Roman Catholic Archdiocese of Chicago. He was pastor of St. Mary's Parish in Chicago and taught at St. Mary's Seminary.

During the American Civil War, he served as chaplain for the Union Army. On July 5, 1897, Butler was appointed bishop of the Diocese of Concordia (now the Diocese of Salina). However, he died in Rome on July 16, 1897, before he was ordained bishop. He was buried at Calvary Cemetery in Evanston, Illinois.
