= Cyril John Vogel =

American prelate

His Excellency, The Most Reverend Cyril John Vogel
- Bishop of Salina
- Church: Catholic Church
- See: Salina
- In office: June 25, 1965 – October 4, 1979
- Predecessor: Frederick William Freking
- Successor: Daniel Kucera

Orders
- Ordination: June 7, 1931 by Hugh Charles Boyle
- Consecration: June 17, 1965 by William G. Connare

Personal details
- Born: January 15, 1905 Pittsburgh, Pennsylvania, US
- Died: October 4, 1979 (aged 74) Salina, Kansas, US
- Education: Duquesne University; St. Vincent's Seminary
- Motto: Joy by the will of God

Cyril John Vogel (January 15, 1905 – October 4, 1979) was an American prelate of the Catholic Church. He served as bishop of Salina in Kansas from 1965 until his death in 1979.

== Biography ==
=== Early life ===
The second youngest of ten children, Cyril Vogel was born on January 15, 1905, in Pittsburgh, Pennsylvania, to Henry J. and Mary Agnes (née Foley) Vogel. After graduating from Duquesne University in Pittsburgh, he began his studies for the priesthood at St. Vincent's Seminary in Latrobe, Pennsylvania.

=== Priesthood ===
Vogel was ordained to the priesthood for the Diocese of Pittsburgh by Bishop Hugh Charles Boyle on June 7, 1931 in Pittsburgh. After his ordination, the diocese assigned Vogel as a curate at a parish in Pittsburgh. He was appointed pastor of Sacred Heart Parish in Sagamore, Pennsylvania, in 1950. Vogel also served as the director of adult education and as a member of the diocesan tribunal.

When the Vatican erected the Diocese of Greensburg in 1951, Vogel was incardinated, or transferred, into it. He later served as pastor of both St. John Baptist de la Salle Parish in Delmont, Pennsylvania, and Holy Family Parish in Latrobe as well as chancellor of the diocese. In 1960, Bishop William G. Connare named Vogel as his vicar general.

=== Bishop of Salina ===
On April 10, 1965, Vogel was appointed the sixth bishop of Salina by Pope Paul VI. He received his episcopal consecration on June 17, 1965, from Connare, with Bishops George L. Leech and Vincent Leonard serving as co-consecrators, at the Cathedral of the Blessed Sacrament in Greensburg. Vogel was installed by Archbishop Edward Joseph Hunkeler at Sacred Heart Cathedral in Salina on June 25, 1965.

Vogel attended the final 1965 session of the Second Vatican Council in Rome, whose reforms he implemented in the diocese. During Vogel's tenure, established the diocesan and parish councils, the priests' senate, the clergy personnel board, the Clergy Health and Retirement Association, the diocesan Liturgy and Building Commissions, and programs for education at all levels. He erected new churches in Hays and Minneapolis (1967), Clyde (1969), and Hoxie and Washington (1979), all in Kansas. He also purchased two houses which he converted into a "student center" for the Catholic Student Union at the Fort Hays State University in Hays (1969).

=== Death ===
Vogel died on October 4, 1979, from a heart attack at his residence in Salina, aged 74.

Catholic Church titles
Preceded by Frederick William Freking	Bishop of Salina; 1965–1979	Succeeded by Daniel Kucera
