= George Kinzie Fitzsimons =

American Roman Catholic prelate

His Excellency, The Most Reverend George Kinzie Fitzsimons
- Bishop of Salina; Titular Bishop of Pertusa
- Church: Roman Catholic Church
- See: Salina
- In office: May 29, 1984 – October 21, 2004
- Predecessor: Daniel Kucera
- Successor: Paul Stagg Coakley
- Previous post: Auxiliary Bishop of Kansas City-St. Joseph (1975–1984)

Orders
- Ordination: March 18, 1961 by John Cody
- Consecration: July 3, 1975 by Charles Herman Helmsing

Personal details
- Born: September 4, 1928 Kansas City, Missouri, U.S.
- Died: July 28, 2013 (aged 84) Ogden, Kansas, U.S.
- Education: Rockhurst University; Conception Seminary
- Motto: Faith and joy

George Kinzie Fitzsimons (September 4, 1928 – July 28, 2013) was an American prelate of the Roman Catholic Church. He served as bishop of Salina in Kansas from 1984 to 2004. Fitzsimons previously served as an auxiliary bishop of the Diocese of Kansas City-St. Joseph in Missouri.

== Biography ==
=== Early life ===
George Fitzsimons was born on September 4, 1928, in Kansas City, Missouri, to George K. and Margaret Mary (née Donavan) Fitzsimons. The family worshipped at St. Francis Xavier Church and Fitzsimons its elementary school He then attended Rockhurst High School, followed by Rockhurst University, both in Kansas City. After his graduation, Fitzsimons worked in business. With the start of the Korean War in 1950, he enlisted in the US Navy. Between 1952 and 1953, he served as a naval aviator with U.S. Navy Patrol Squadron VP-49.

A short time after his discharge from the Navy in 1954, Fitzsimons decided to enter the priesthood. He began his studies at Conception Seminary in Conception, Missouri.

=== Priesthood ===
Fitzsimons was ordained a priest at the Cathedral of the Immaculate Conception in Kansas City, Missouri, for the Diocese of Kansas City-St. Joseph by Bishop John Cody on March 18, 1961. Over the years, the diocese assigned Fitzsimons as associate pastor in parishes, as well as a high school teacher and college chaplain. Bishop Charles Herman Helmsing eventually named Fitzsimons as chancellor and vicar general of the diocese.

=== Auxiliary Bishop of Kansas City-St. Joseph ===
On May 20, 1975, Fitzsimons was appointed as an auxiliary bishop of Kansas City-St. Joseph and titular bishop of Pertusa by Pope Paul VI. He received his episcopal consecration on July 3, 1975, from Bishop Charles Herman Helmsing, with Archbishop William Wakefield Baum and Bishop Joseph Vincent Sullivan serving as co-consecrators, at the Cathedral of the Immaculate Conception.Fitzsimons also served as pastor of Christ the King Parish in Kansas City, Missouri.

=== Bishop of Salina ===
Fitzsimons was named the eighth bishop of Salina on March 28, 1984. He was installed by Archbishop Strecker at Sacred Heart Cathedral in Salina, Kansas on May 29, 1984.During his tenure as bishop in Salina, Fitzsimons established an Office of Lay Ministry, with a director and an advisory Board, funded and initiated by the Catholic Church Extension Society in Chicago, Illinois, as well as a Rural Life Commission. He initiated the RENEW parish spiritual growth program. Due to a declining population and priest shortage, Fitzsimons was forced to merge several parishes. He erect St. Nicholas of Myra Parish in Hays, Kansas and St. Thomas More Parish in Manhattan, Kansas, in 1981.

=== Retirement and death ===
After reaching the mandatory retirement age of 75, Fitzsimons resigned as bishop of Salina on October 21, 2004. He then moved into the rectory at St. Patrick Parish in Ogden, Kansas. In 2008, his lower left leg was amputated due to a severe infection; he then used a prosthesis. Fitzsimons died at age 84 in Ogden on July 28, 2013.

== See also ==
Catholic Church titles
Preceded by Daniel Kucera	Bishop of Salina; 1984–2004	Succeeded by Paul Stagg Coakley
