= Daniel Kucera =

American Catholic bishop

His Excellency, The Most Reverend Daniel William Kucera O.S.B
- Archbishop of Dubuque
- Church: Catholic Church
- Appointed: December 20, 1983
- Installed: February 23, 1984
- Term ended: October 16, 1995
- Predecessor: James Joseph Byrne
- Successor: Jerome Hanus
- Previous posts: Bishop of Salina (1980–1983); Titular Bishop of Natchesium; Auxiliary Bishop of Joliet (1977–1980); Abbot of St. Procopius Abbey (1964 to 1971)

Orders
- Ordination: May 26, 1949 by Martin Dewey McNamara
- Consecration: July 21, 1977 by Romeo Roy Blanchette, Andrew Gregory Grutka, and Raymond James Vonesh

Personal details
- Born: William Kucera; May 7, 1923 Chicago, Illinois, US
- Died: May 30, 2017 (aged 94) Dubuque, Iowa, US
- Education: St. Procopius College; Catholic University of America
- Motto: Benedicite Domino (Bless the Lord)

Styles of Daniel William Kucera
- Reference style: His Excellency; The Most Reverend
- Spoken style: Your Excellency
- Religious style: Archbishop

Ordination history of Daniel Kucera
History
Episcopal consecration
- Consecrated by: Romeo Roy Blanchette (Joliet)
- Date: July 21, 1977
Episcopal succession
Bishops consecrated by Daniel Kucera as principal consecrator
- William Edwin Franklin: April 1, 1987

Daniel William Kucera, OSB (Czech pronunciation [kuˈtsera]; May 7, 1923 – May 30, 2017) was an American Catholic prelate who served as an auxiliary bishop for the Diocese of Joliet (1977–1980), Bishop of Salina (1980–1983), and Archbishop of Dubuque (1983–1995). He was a member of the Benedictines.

== Early life ==
Daniel Kucera was born in a Czech family in Chicago, Illinois, on May 7, 1923. His parents were Joseph F. and Lillian (Petrzelka) Kucera. Kucera was educated at St. Procopius College in Lisle, Illinois. He took the religious name of Daniel when he professed religious vows to the Benedictines on June 16, 1944, at St. Procopius Abbey in Lisle, Illinois.

== Priesthood ==
On May 26, 1949, Kucera was ordained a priest for the Benedictines at the Cathedral of St. Raymond Nonnatus in Joliet, Illinois, by Bishop Martin Dewey McNamara. After his ordination, the Benedictines sent Kucera to Washington D.C. to study at Catholic University of America. He earned a Doctor of Education degree in 1954. Over the years, Kucera's background in education led Vatican officials, including the pope, to seek his opinions on educational matters. Kucera served in various administrative positions at St. Procopius College until he was named the college's president.

On July 8, 1964, Kucera was elected abbot of St. Procopius Abbey; he received his abbatial blessing on August 19, 1964. He served as abbot until June 1, 1971, when he resigned to become the college's president again.

== Auxiliary Bishop of Joliet ==
On June 6, 1977, Pope Paul VI named Kucera as titular bishop of Tatchesium and auxiliary bishop of Joliet. He was consecrated at the Cathedral of St. Raymond Nonnatus by Bishop Romeo Roy Blanchette. Bishops Andrew Grutka of Gary and Raymond Vonesh, auxiliary bishop of Joliet, served as co-consecrators.

== Bishop of Salina ==
On March 5, 1980, Pope John Paul II appointed Kucera as the eighth bishop of Salina. He was installed at Sacred Heart Cathedral in Salina, Kansas, on May 7, 1980, by Archbishop Ignatius J. Strecker.

During his three years in Salina, Kucera established the diocesan Office of Planning, the Bishop's Council for Catholic Education and the Office of Youth Ministries. He hired a business manager, and moved the administrative offices to a larger building in Salina. The diocese took over operation of Marymount College in Salina from the Sisters of St. Joseph of Concordia as they could no longer manage it. The college closed in 1989.

== Archbishop of Dubuque ==
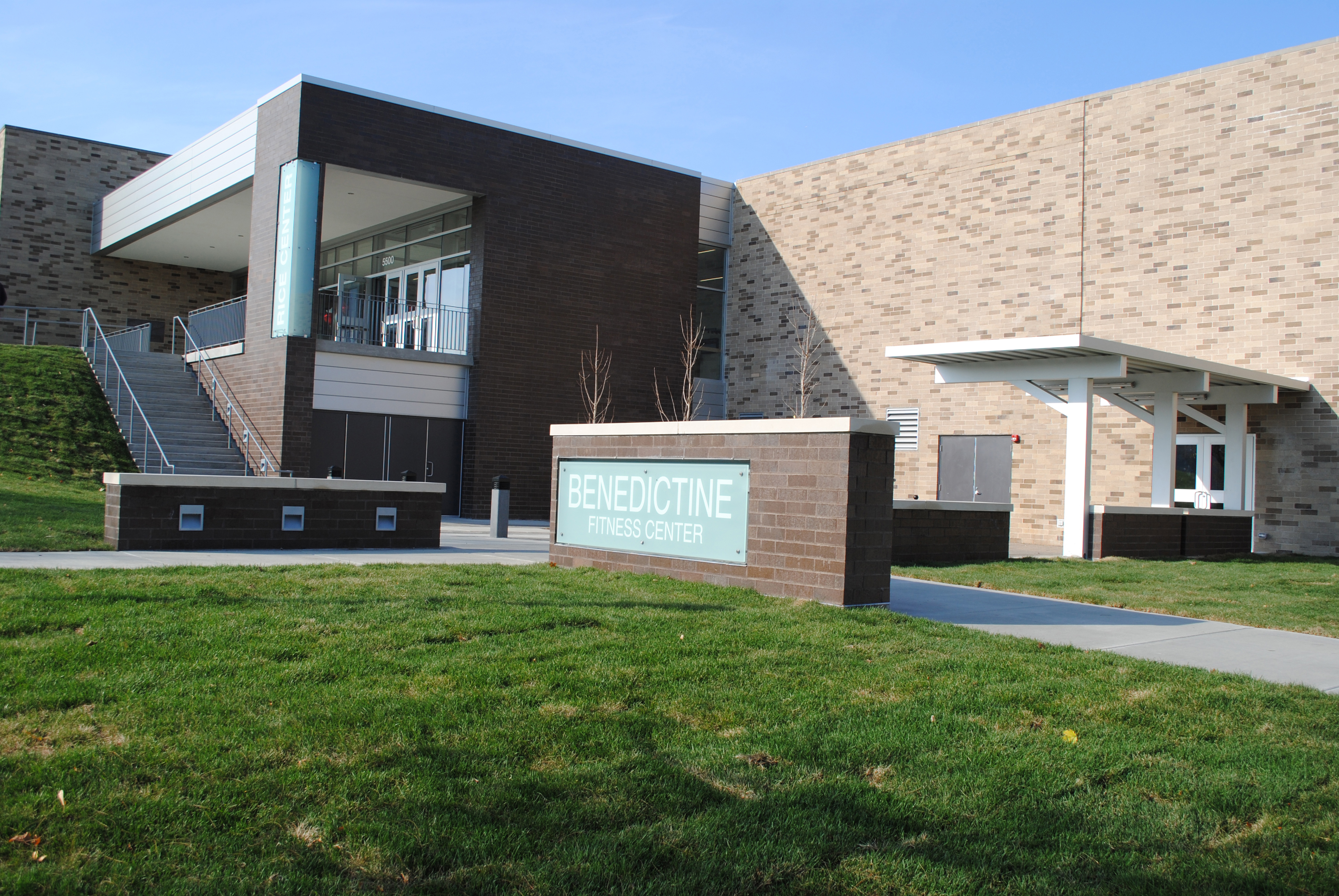
Benedictine University (formerly St. Procopius College), Lisle, Illinois (2011)

On December 20, 1983, Pope John Paul II appointed Kucera as the eighth archbishop of Dubuque. He was installed as archbishop on February 23, 1984, at the Five Flags Center in Dubuque. One of his first decisions was to sell the old episcopal residence and move to a more modest house in Dubuque.

Kucera set about reorganizing the archdiocese. This was accomplished by reorganizing or creating archdiocesan boards, and established the first archbishop's cabinet to coordinate the running of the archdiocese. Kucera divided the archdiocese into three regions (Dubuque, Cedar Rapids and Waterloo) with an bishop running each region. He reduced the number of deaneries from 16 to 14. Kucera appointed a woman religious chancellor, and two lay people were named to archdiocesan offices. He also had revised guidelines for the Sacrament of Confirmation published in 1986.

In November 1986, Kucera proclaimed the 150th anniversary of the founding of the archdiocese. The archdiocese held celebrations throughout 1987, including a large scale liturgy at the Five Flags Center, celebrated by Archbishop Pio Laghi. Kucera also approved a controversial renovation of St. Raphael's Cathedral.

In 1994, Kucera requested the appointment of a coadjutor archbishop by the pope to assist him in administering the archdiocese. John Paul II in early 1995 named Bishop Jerome Hanus as coadjutor archbishop of Dubuque. On October 16, 1995, John Paul II accepted Kucera's resignation, naming him archbishop emeritus.

== Later life and death ==
By 2013, Kucera had moved back to Dubuque after living in Aurora, Colorado, for several years. On May 30, 2017, Kucera died at the Stonehill Care Center in Dubuque at age 94. His funeral was held at St. Raphael's Cathedral in Dubuque, and he was interred in the cemetery of St. Procopius Abbey.

== See also ==
- Catholic Church hierarchy
- Catholic Church in the United States
- Historical list of the Catholic bishops of the United States
- List of Catholic bishops of the United States
- Lists of patriarchs, archbishops, and bishops

== Episcopal succession ==
Catholic Church titles
Preceded by James Joseph Byrne	Archbishop of Dubuque; 1984–1995	Succeeded by Jerome Hanus
Preceded by Cyril John Vogel	Bishop of Salina; 1980–1983	Succeeded by George Kinzie Fitzsimons
