= Francis Augustine Thill =

American Catholic bishop (1893–1957)

His Excellency, The Most Reverend Francis Augustine Thill
- Bishop of Salina
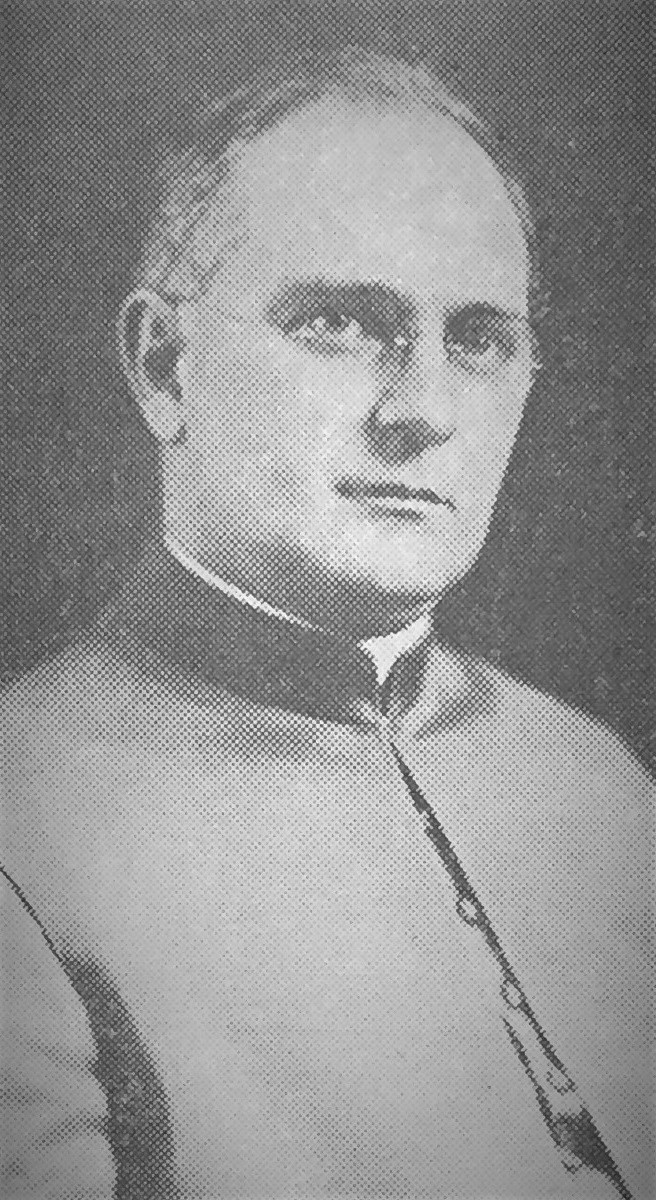
- Church: Roman Catholic Church
- See: Diocese of Salina
- In office: December 23, 1944 – May 21, 1957
- Predecessor: Francis Joseph Tief
- Successor: Frederick William Freking
- Previous post: Bishop of Concordia (1938 to 1944)

Orders
- Ordination: February 28, 1920 by Henry K. Moeller
- Consecration: October 28, 1938 by John T. McNicholas

Personal details
- Born: March 7, 1881 Dayton, Ohio, US
- Died: September 22, 1965 (aged 84) Salina, Kansas, US
- Education: University of Dayton; Mount St. Mary's Seminary of the West; Pontifical University of Saint Thomas Aquinas
- Motto: Religionis augmentum (The growth of religion)

Francis Augustine Thill (October 12, 1893 – May 21, 1957) was an American prelate of the Roman Catholic Church. He served as bishop of the Diocese of Concordia in Kansas, later becoming the Diocese of Salina, from 1938 until his death in 1957.

== Biography ==
=== Early life ===
Francis Thill was born on October 12, 1893, in Dayton, Ohio, to Bernard and Margaret (née Schele) Thill. After attending the University of Dayton, he entered Mount St. Mary's Seminary of the West at Cincinnati, Ohio, in 1914. As a seminarian, he established and organized the Catholic Students' Mission Crusade to aid missionaries in foreign countries.

=== Priesthood ===
Thill was ordained to the priesthood for the Archdiocese of Cincinnati by Archbishop Henry K. Moeller on February 28, 1920. He then furthered his studies at the Pontifical University of St. Thomas Aquinas in Rome, and toured American missionary outposts in Asia. Upon his return to Ohio, Thill served as professor of oratory at Mount St. Mary's. He was appointed chancellor of the archdiocese in 1935. The Vatican in 1937 elevated Thill to the rank of domestic prelate.

=== Bishop of Concordia ===
On August 26, 1938, Thill was appointed the fourth bishop of Concordia by Pope Pius XI. He received his episcopal consecration on October 28, 1938, from Archbishop John T. McNicholas, with Archbishops Francis Beckman and Urban Vehr serving as co-consecrators, at St. Monica's Cathedral in Cincinnati. Thill was installed by Archbishop John J. Glennon in Concordia, Kansas, on November 15, 1938. Despite the lingering effects of the 1930s Great Depression, Thill managed to liquidate the diocesan debt of nearly $250,000 in late 1942.

=== Bishop of Salina ===
On December 23, 1944, Pope Pius XII moved the episcopal see from Concordia to Salina, Kansas, much to the chagrin of local Catholics.Thill now became the first bishop of Salina.

During his tenure, Thill laid the cornerstone for Sacred Heart Cathedral in Salina on June 4, 1951, and later dedicated it on June 6, 1953. He erected or remodeled 25 churches, ten schools, 11 rectories, nine convents, and six chapels. Thill ordained 35 priests and founded the Catholic Youth Organization of Concordia in 1939.

=== Death ===
Francis Thill died in Salina on May 21, 1957, at age 63. He is buried at Mount Calvary Cemetery in Salina.

Catholic Church titles
Preceded by Francis Joseph Tief	Bishop of Salina; 1938–1957	Succeeded by Frederick William Freking
