= Frederick William Freking =

American prelate

His Excellency, The Most Reverend Frederick William Freking
- Bishop of La Crosse
- Church: Catholic Church
- See: Diocese of La Crosse
- In office: February 23, 1965 – May 10, 1983
- Predecessor: John Patrick Treacy
- Successor: John Joseph Paul
- Previous post: Bishop of Salina (1957 to 1964)

Orders
- Ordination: July 31, 1938 by Luca Pasetto
- Consecration: November 30, 1957 by Giuseppe Pizzardo

Personal details
- Born: August 11, 1913 Heron Lake, Minnesota, US
- Died: November 28, 1998 (aged 85) La Crosse, Wisconsin, US
- Education: St. Mary's College; Pontifical Gregorian University
- Motto: In te confido (I trust in You)

Frederick William Freking (August 11, 1913 – November 28, 1998) was an American prelate of the Catholic Church who served as bishop of the Diocese of Salina, in Kansas (1957–1964) and bishop of the Diocese of La Crosse in Wisconsin (1964–1983).

== Biography ==
=== Early life and education ===
Freking was born in Heron Lake, Minnesota, one of nineteen children of August and Rosa (née Oberbroeckling) Freking. He received his early education at the parochial school of Sacred Heart Parish, and then attended Heron Lake Public High School.

In 1934, Freking earned a Bachelor of Arts degree from St. Mary's College in Winona, Minnesota. He completed his studies in philosophy and theology in Rome, at the Pontifical North American College and the Pontifical Gregorian University. He earned a Bachelor of Sacred Theology degree in 1937.

=== Priesthood and ministry ===
On July 31, 1938, Freking was ordained to the priesthood at the Church of St. Ignatius of Loyola at Campus Martius in Rome for the Diocese of Winona in Rome by Archbishop Luca Pasetto. Following his return to Minnesota, he served as a curate in Winona, Dakota, and La Moille, and as editor of the diocesan newspaper. He later went to Washington D.C. to attend the Catholic University of America. He earned a Doctor of Canon Law degree in 1948. Freking was appointed diocesan chancellor in 1952. In 1953, he returned to Rome to serve as spiritual director of the North American College.

=== Bishop of Salina ===
On October 10, 1957, Freking was appointed the fifth bishop of Salina by Pope Pius XII. He received his episcopal consecration on November 30, 1957, from Cardinal Giuseppe Pizzardo, with Archbishops Luigi Traglia and Martin O'Connor serving as co-consecrators, in Rome at the North American College. His installation took place at Sacred Heart Cathedral in Salina, Kansas, on January 8, 1958. Early in his tenure in Salina, Freking founded the Salina Council of Catholic Women in 1958 and Catholic Charities of Salina the following year. He convoked the first diocesan synod in 1962.

Freking attended all four sessions of the Second Vatican Council in Rome from 1962 through 1965. As bishop of Salina, he established seven new churches, eleven new convents, four new high schools, and seven new grade schools. He also expanded the diocesan Charity and Religion Fund to assist the parishes in financing their construction and renovation projects.

=== Bishop of La Crosse ===
On December 30, 1964, Freking was appointed the sixth bishop of La Crosse by Pope Paul VI. He was installed on February 24, 1965. From 1964 to 1966, he headed the National Catholic Rural Life Conference. During his tenure in La Crosse, he reduced the diocese's debt from $11 million to $4 million between 1965 and 1981. He established a diocesan commission on Christian renewal in 1965, and the first lay ministry training program in the United States in 1975.

Freking also oversaw construction of 14 churches, 15 rectories, seven elementary schools, 22 religious education centers, five convents and the Newman Center. Freking also supervised 36 church renovations and expansions, and 59 priests were ordained while he was bishop. He was instrumental in the founding of the Bethany-St. Joseph Care Center in La Crosse for the elderly by the diocese and the Lutheran Church in La Crosse.

=== Retirement and death ===
On May 10, 1983, Pope John Paul II accepted Freking's resignation as bishop of La Crosse. Frederick Freking, who long suffered from respiratory problems, died from complications of emphysema at the Franciscan Skemp Medical Center in La Crosse at age 85.

== See also ==
- Catholic Church hierarchy
- Catholic Church in the United States
- Historical list of the Catholic bishops of the United States
- List of Catholic bishops of the United States
- Lists of patriarchs, archbishops, and bishops

Catholic Church titles
Preceded by John Patrick Treacy	Bishop of La Crosse; 1964–1983	Succeeded by John Joseph Paul
Preceded by Francis Augustine Thill	Bishop of Salina; 1957–1964	Succeeded by Cyril John Vogel
