= Tief =

Tief is a surname of German origin, meaning "deep" or "low". Notable people with the surname include:

- Francis Joseph Tief (1881-1965), American clergyman
- Otto Tief (1889–1976), Estonian politician
