= Thomas More Prep-Marian =

Location
- 1701 Hall Street; Hays, Kansas 67601; United States; 38°52′53″N 99°20′17″W

Information
- School type: Private high school
- Denomination: Roman Catholic
- Established: 1981
- Principal: Chad Meitner
- Chaplain: Rev. Earl Befort, O.F.M.Cap.
- Teaching staff: 31
- Grades: 6–12
- Gender: [Co-Ed]
- Enrollment: 221 (2009)
- Average class size: 55
- Colors: Navy blue and white
- Slogan: Give us four years, and we will give you a lifetime!
- Team name: Monarchs
- Rival: Russell Broncos; Plainville Cardinals
- Accreditation: North Central Association of Colleges and Schools
- Newspaper: The Chancellor
- Affiliation: Capuchin Franciscan
- Website: School Website

Thomas More Prep-Marian (TMP-M), TMP, is a co-educational Catholic college preparatory high school located in Hays, Kansas in the United States. The original school was founded by the Capuchin Franciscan order. Although now governed by the Roman Catholic Diocese of Salina, the order still maintains a presence in the school.

== History ==
Thomas More Prep Marian traces its roots back to 1908 when Hays Catholic College was founded by the Capuchin Franciscans to educate local boys. It was renamed St. Joseph's College in 1931 after moving into a new school building. The following year, it began offering the ROTC program. In 1952 the junior college program was dropped and it became solely a high school. The school name became St. Joseph's Military Academy to reflect this change.

The Girls' Catholic High School was founded in 1918 by the Sisters of St. Agnes and was subsequently renamed Marian High School in 1961.

St. Francis Seminary was founded in 1948 in Victoria, a town approximately 10 miles outside of Hays. It incorporated a high school program to prepare young men for the priesthood.

Marian High, St. Francis Seminary, and St. Joseph's Military Academy all consolidated into Thomas More Prep-Marian between 1970 and 1981. In 2003, the Diocese took over governance of the school. From the 2012–13 academic year, grades 7 and 8 were added.

== Extracurricular activities ==
=== Athletics ===
==== Men's Basketball ====
The TMP Marian basketball team won the 3A state championship in 2005 and the 4A state championship in 2007.

==== Football ====
The TMP Marian Football team went 5–4 in the 2011–2012 school year.

==== Girls' Basketball ====
The Lady Monarchs basketball won the 3A state championship in 2010.

==== Girls' Track & Field ====
The Lady Monarchs finished runner-up at the 3A KSHSAA 2012 Track & Field State Championships.

==== Baseball ====
The TMP Marian baseball team made three straight state appearances in 3A in the years 2010-2012 and had a combined record of 66-9 those three years. They finished state runners-up in 2010 and 2011, and were eliminated in the first round in 2012.

==== Girls' Soccer ====
The Lady Monarch soccer team finished runner-up at the 4-1A state championship in 2017.

== Notable alumni ==
- John L. Allen, Jr., American Journalist
- Jeff Colyer, Governor of Kansas
- David J. Tholen, Astronomer
