= Gerald Lee Vincke =

American Catholic prelate (born 1964)

His Excellency, The Most Reverend Gerald Lee Vincke
- Bishop of Salina
- Diocese: Salina
- Appointed: June 13, 2018
- Installed: August 22, 2018
- Predecessor: Edward Weisenburger

Orders
- Ordination: June 12, 1999 by Carl Frederick Mengeling
- Consecration: August 22, 2018 by Joseph Fred Naumann, Carl Frederick Mengeling, and Joseph G. Hanefeldt

Personal details
- Born: July 9, 1964 (age 62) Saginaw, Michigan, US
- Education: Ferris State University; Thomas More College; Athenaeum of Ohio; Sacred Heart Major Seminary; Creighton University
- Motto: Rich in mercy
- Styles
- Reference style: His Excellency; The Most Reverend
- Spoken style: Your Excellency
- Religious style: Bishop

Gerald Lee Vincke (born July 9, 1964) is an American Catholic prelate serving as Bishop of Salina in Kansas since 2018.

== Biography ==
=== Early life ===
Vincke was born on July 9, 1964, in Saginaw, Michigan, one of 10 children of Henry and Fidelis Vincke. He attended New Lothrop High School in New Lothrop. After graduating from high school, Vincke enrolled at Ferris State University in Big Rapids. He received an associate degree in journalism in 1985 and a bachelor's degree of science in public relations and marketing in 1986.

After graduating from Ferris State, Vincke decided to become a priest. In late 1986, he started studying philosophy at Thomas More College in Crestview, Kentucky and theology at the nearby Athenaeum of Ohio Seminary in Cincinnati. Vincke then returned to Michigan to attend Sacred Heart Major Seminary in Detroit. He graduated from Sacred Heart with a Master of Divinity degree in 1999.

=== Priesthood ===
On June 12, 1999, Vincke was ordained to the priesthood for the Diocese of Lansing at St. Mary Cathedral by Bishop Carl Frederick Mengeling. After his 1999 ordination, the diocese assigned Vincke as parochial vicar at St. Thomas the Apostle Parish in Ann Arbor. He left St. Thomas in 2001 to attend Creighton University in Omaha, Nebraska, to study spirituality.

On his return to Michigan in 2002, Vincke became director of the Bethany House Youth Retreat Center in Lansing. In 2003, Vincke was also named as director of seminarians for the diocese, where he would serve for the next seven years. He ceased being the director of Bethany House a year later. In 2005, he assumed the role of weekend pastor, in addition to his other responsibilities, at St. Thomas Parish in East Lansing. In 2006, Mengeling appointed Vincke as chair of the Formation Department, relieving him of his other positions.

Vincke came to Rome in 2010 to serve as spiritual director at the Pontifical North American College. Pope Benedict XVI named him as a Chaplain to His Holiness in 2012. Five years later, Vincke was assigned as pastor of Holy Family Parish in Grand Blanc.

=== Bishop of Salina ===
Pope Francis appointed Vincke as bishop of Salina on June 13, 2018. He was consecrated at Sacred Heart Cathedral by Archbishop Joseph Fred Naumann on August 22, 2018. Vincke adopted the episcopal motto "Rich in Mercy", saying in a 2018 interview:

I am so aware of God’s incredible mercy in my life. I know that he loves me even as imperfect as I am. And because of that, I am called to show his mercy to others – to remember that God loves them in the same way he loves me.

In September 2018, the Archdiocese of Washington announced that former Cardinal Theodore McCarrick would reside at St. Fidelis Parish in Victoria, Kansas. Vincke explained his decision to permit the arrangement by a need to have mercy while pursuing justice. In his statement, he referred to Maria Goretti, a sainted girl who forgave her killer on her deathbed. In January 2020, it was announced that McCarrick, by then laicized, had moved to an undisclosed location.

In February 2021, Vincke assumed the additional responsibility of being apostolic administrator of the Diocese of Dodge City. Its bishop, John Balthasar Brungardt, was being investigated by the Vatican and the Kansas Bureau of Investigation for allegations of child sexual abuse. On March 23, 2022, Bishop Brundgardt was cleared of the allegations and reassumed leadership of the Diocese of Dodge City.

Catholic Church titles
Preceded by Edward Weisenburger	Bishop of Salina; 2018–present	Succeeded by Incumbent
