= Diocese of Salina =

Diocese of the Catholic Church in Kansas, U.S.

Coordinates: 38°49′27″N 97°36′26″W

Diocese of Salina Dioecesis Salinensis
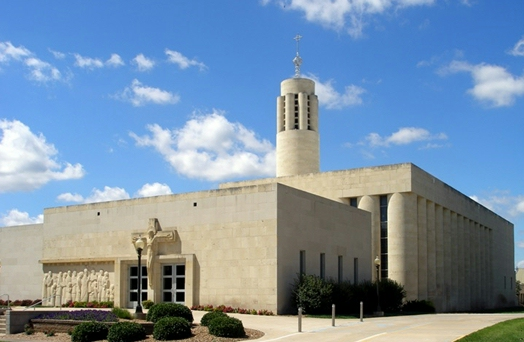
- Sacred Heart Cathedral

- Coat of arms

Location
- Country: United States
- Territory: 31 counties in north-central and northwest Kansas
- Ecclesiastical province: Kansas City in Kansas

Statistics
- Area: 26,685 sq mi (69,110 km^{2})
- Population: Total; Catholics: (as of 2010); 342,000; 46,671 (14.1%)
- Parishes: 86

Information
- Denomination: Catholic
- Sui iuris church: Latin Church
- Rite: Roman Rite
- Established: August 2, 1887 as the Diocese of Concordia; December 23, 1944 as the Diocese of Salina
- Cathedral: Sacred Heart Cathedral
- Patron saint: Our Lady of Perpetual Help

Current leadership
- Pope: Leo XIV
- Bishop: Gerald Lee Vincke
- Metropolitan Archbishop: William Shawn McKnight

Map
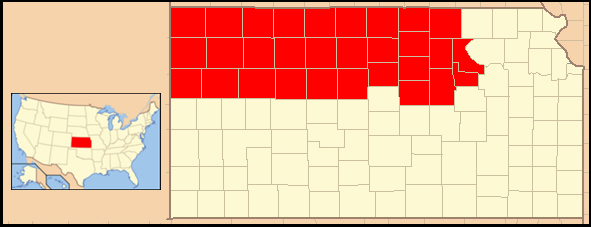

Website
- www.salinadiocese.org

The Diocese of Salina (Latin: Dioecesis Salinensis) is a diocese of the Catholic Church in northern Kansas in the United States. The diocese was founded as the Diocese of Concordia in 1887 and renamed in 1944 as the Diocese of Salina. It is a suffragan diocese of the metropolitan Archdiocese of Kansas City in Kansas.

== Territory ==
The Diocese of Salina covers 31 counties in northern Kansas.

== History ==
=== 1540 to 1850 ===
The earliest Catholic presence in present day Kansas was during the 1540s, when Juan de Padilla, the Spanish missionary priest, accompanied the Spanish explorer Francisco Vázquez de Coronado on his expedition through the region.

During the 18th century, present day Kansas was under the jurisdictions of Spain and France. The few Catholics in the area were governed by the Diocese of Louisiana and the Two Floridas, based in New Orleans. After the Louisiana Purchase of 1803, Kansas became part of the United States.

The Vatican in 1826 erected the Diocese of St. Louis, which included Kansas and the vast Missouri Territory. During the early 1800s, Catholic missionaries started building chapels for their Native American converts. In 1847, Jesuit priests established the St. Mary's Mission in St. Marys, Kansas, along the Oregon Trail, to evangelize the Potawatomi people.

=== 1850 to 1880 ===
Pope Pius IX in 1850 erected the Vicariate Apostolic of Indian Territory East of the Rocky Mountains. This huge jurisdiction contained the present-day states of Kansas, Nebraska, North and South Dakota, Colorado, Wyoming, and Montana. The pope named John Miège from St. Louis as the vicar apostolic.

Miège arrived in 1851 at an Potawatomi encampment on the Kansas River. At that time, his vicariate contained five churches, eight priests, and 5,000 Catholics. He then moved to the Jesuit mission at St. Marys. Miège conducted extensive pastoral visitations throughout the vicariate, visiting Native American villages, forts, trading posts, and growing towns. He would celebrate mass at these stops on the rear end of his wagon.

In 1855, Miège established his episcopal see in Leavenworth in order to better minister to the growing number of Catholic European settlers there. By this time, the vicariate had a Catholic population of approximately 5,000, with 3,000 Native American converts. It was served by eight priests in 11 missions and 18 stations.

The first Catholic mass in Salina was celebrated in 1861 in a private home. Sacred Heart Church, the first Catholic church in the city, was dedicated in 1876. After the US Army established Fort Hays near Hays, Kansas, in 1865, priests would periodically visit there to minister to the Catholic soldiers.In Beloit, St. John the Baptist Parish celebrated its first mass in 1871, with its church dedicated in 1878.

The Diocese of Leavenworth, covering all of Kansas, was erected in 1877 by Pius IX. He named Louis Fink as its first bishop. Fink visited Salina that same year. Kansas grew so rapidly over the next ten years that Fink petitioned the Vatican to establish two new dioceses in the western part of the state. St. Andrew's Church, the first in Abilene, was dedicated in 1875.Our Lady of Good Hope, the first Catholic church in Concordia, was completed in 1879.The first church in Hays, St. Joseph's, was also built in 1879 for Catholic German immigrants from the Russian Empire.

=== 1880 to 1900 ===
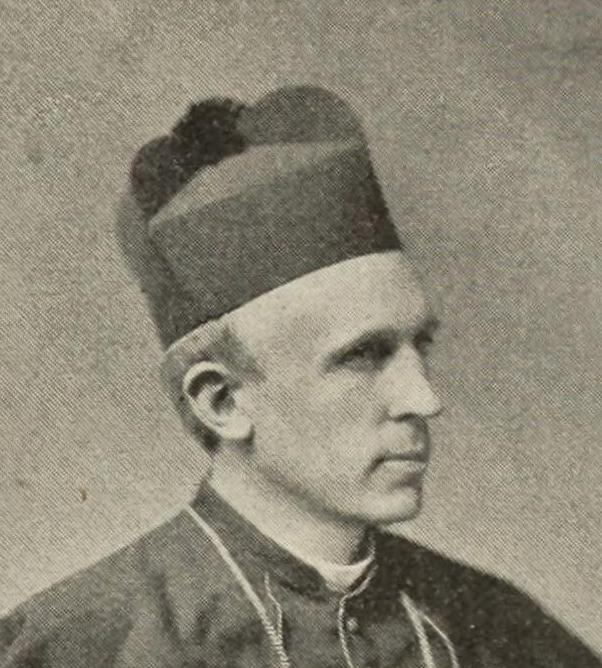
Bishop Scannell (1889)

In 1887, Pope Leo XIII erected the Diocese of Concordia, the forerunner of the Diocese of Salina, out of the Diocese of Leavenworth. The pope named Richard Scannell from the Diocese of Nashville as the first bishop of Concordia.That same year, he dedicated Our Lady of Perpetual Help Cathedral in Concordia.

With only 20 resident pastors and a growing Catholic population in the diocese, Scannell attempted to solve the priest shortage by establishing a preparatory seminary in Belleville, laying its cornerstone in June 1890. However, due to the Panic of 1893, a national depression, the seminary was never built, leaving the diocese with a long-lasting debt.

During his three-year-long tenure, Scannell also assisted the Sisters of St. Joseph to become permanently established in the diocese, erected 15 churches, and increased the number of diocesan priests from five to 22. Leo XIII named Scannell as bishop of the Diocese of Omaha in 1891. Leo XIII's replacement for Scannell in Salina, Thaddeus J. Butler, died before his consecration as bishop.

In 1898, John Cunningham from Leavenworth was appointed the second bishop of Concordia by Leo XIII. Described as the "diocesan builder," Cunningham erected 54 churches, 22 schools, and three hospitals during his tenure. He opened the St. Joseph's Orphanage in addition to several rectories and convents.

=== 1900 to 1930 ===
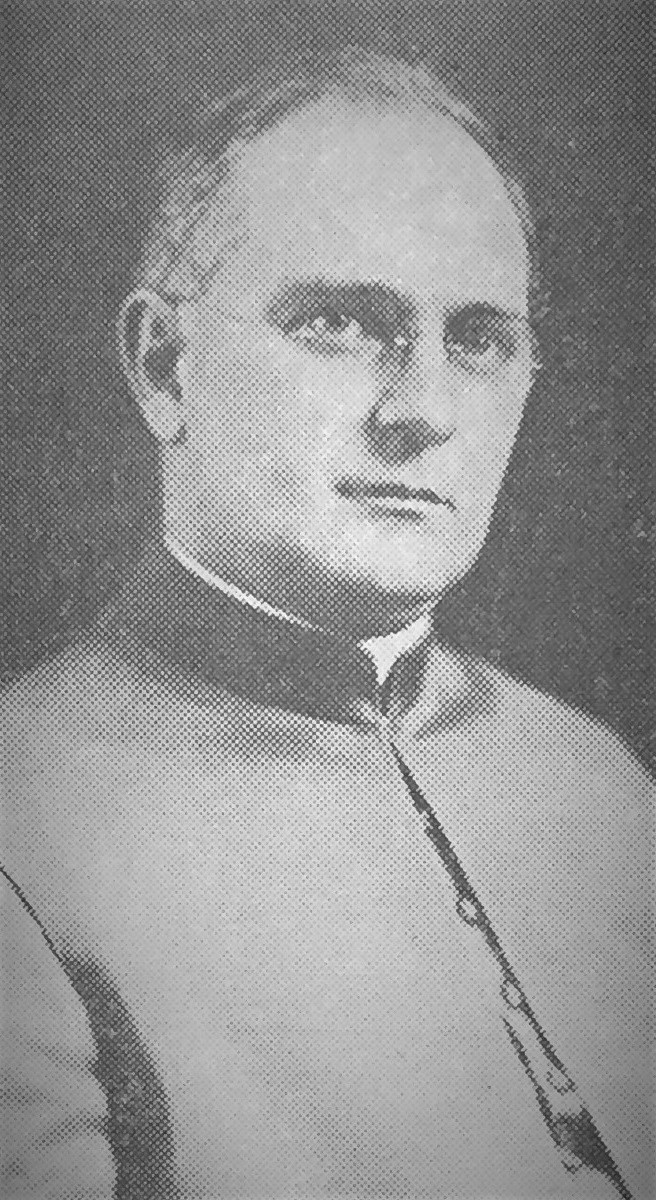
Bishop Thill (1925)

in 1902, the Sisters of St. Joseph opened the Nazareth Convent, their motherhouse in Concordia.The Capuchin Franciscans in 1908 started Hays Catholic College in Hays to provide high school and some college courses to boys. Today it is Thomas More Prep - Marian Jr/Sr High school.

In 1913, the Sisters of St. Joseph arrived in Salina from Concordia to build a college for women. However, the entry the United States into World War I in 1917 prevented the start of its construction.In Abilene, the Sisters of St. Joseph opened the St. Joseph Home and Orphanage in 1915. After Cunningham died in 1919, Pope Benedict XV in 1921 named Francis Tief of the Archdiocese of Hartford as the third bishop of Concordia. Marymount College finally opened in 1922. Tief in 1924 opened the Home of the Little Flower in Concordia, a residence for the elderly. Tief also pioneered the religious vacation school movement in 1927.

=== 1930 to 1950 ===
The Sisters of St. Joseph in 1936 purchased the former YMCA building in Manhattan, Kansas, converting it into St. Mary's Hospital. Today it is Mercy Regional Health Center.

During his tenure, Tief built or renovated eight churches, eight rectories, six schools, and two convents. He ordained 28 priests, built a new episcopal residence and chancery in Concordia (1926–1927), and established the Northwestern Kansas Register as the diocesan newspaper in 1937. Tief also pioneered the religious vacation school movement in 1927. Tief retired as bishop of Concordia due to poor health in 1938.

Francis Thill from the Archdiocese of Cincinnati was appointed bishop of Concordia in 1938. Thill founded the Catholic Youth Organization of Concordia in 1939. Despite the lingering effects of the Great Depression of the 1930s, he liquidated the diocesan debt of nearly $250,000 in late 1942.On December 23, 1944, Pope Pius XII renamed the Diocese of Concordia as the Diocese of Salina, with Thill remaining as bishop.

=== 1950 to 1980 ===
Thill died in 1957. During his tenure, Thill erected or remodeled 25 churches, ten schools, 11 rectories, nine convents, and six chapels. He also ordained 35 priests.

To replace Thill, Pope Pius XII in 1957 appointed Frederick Freking, spiritual director of the Pontifical North American College in Rome. In 1958, Freking founded the Salina Council of Catholic Women and Catholic Charities of Salina the following year. He convoked the first diocesan synod in 1962. As bishop of Salina, he oversaw construction of seven churches, eleven convents, four high schools, and seven grade schools. He also expanded the diocesan Charity and Religion Fund to help parishes finance their construction and renovation projects. Freking was named bishop of the Diocese of La Crosse in 1964.

The next bishop of Salina was Cyril Vogel from the Diocese of Pittsburgh, named by Pope Paul VI in April 1965. Vogel in late 1965 attended the final session of the Second Vatican Council in Rome; he implement the reforms from the council in the diocese. During Vogel's tenure, the diocesan and parish councils, the priests' senate, the Clergy Personnel Board, the Clergy Health and Retirement Association, the diocesan Liturgy and Building Commissions, and programs for education at all levels were established. Vogel erected new churches in Hays and Minneapolis, Kansas (1967), Clyde (1969), and Hoxie and Washington, Kansas (1979). He also purchased two houses to convert into the Catholic Student Union at Fort Hays State University in Hays (1969).

=== 1980 to 2000 ===
After Vogel died in 1979, Pope John Paul II selected Auxiliary Bishop Daniel Kucera of the Diocese of Joliet in 1980 as bishop of Salina. He established the diocesan Office of Planning, the Bishop's Council for Catholic Education and the Office of Youth Ministries. The diocese hired a business manager, and moved the chancery and other administrative offices to a larger building in Salina. The diocese assumed control of Marymount College after the Sisters of St. Joseph of Concordia were unable to continue its administration. Kucera was named archbishop of the Archdiocese of Dubuque in 1983.

Auxiliary Bishop George Fitzsimons of the Diocese of Kansas City–Saint Joseph was selected by John Paul II as the next bishop of Salina in 1984. During his tenure, Fitzsimons established an Office of Lay Ministry, with a director and an advisory board, funded and initiated by the Catholic Church Extension Society in Chicago, as well as a Rural Life Commission. He initiated the RENEW parish spiritual growth program. The diocese closed Marymount College in 1989 because of its financial difficulties.Due to a declining population and priest shortage, Fitzsimons merged several parishes. He erected St. Nicholas of Myra Parish in Hays and St. Thomas More Parish in Manhattan.

=== 2000 to present ===
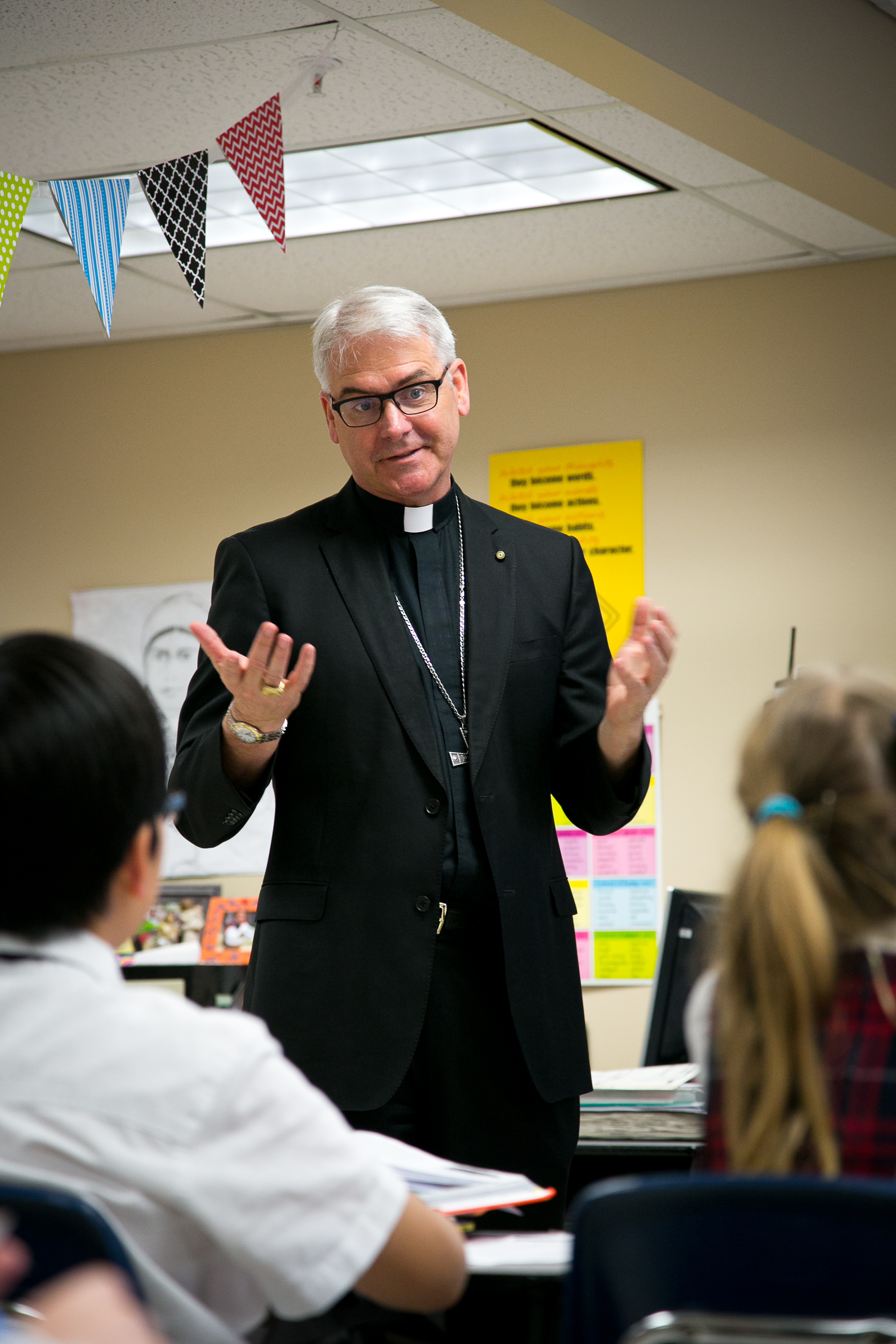
Bishop Coakley (2015)

After Fitzsimon retired as bishop of Salina in 2004, John Paul II named Paul Coakley of the Diocese of Wichita to replace him in 2004. He was named archbishop of the Archdiocese of Oklahoma City in 2010. To replace Coakley, Pope Benedict XVI appointed Edward Weisenburger of Oklahoma as bishop of Salina. He was selected to be bishop of the Diocese of Tucson in 2017.

Pope Francis appointed Gerald Vincke from the Diocese of Lansing as bishop of Salina in 2018. In September 2018, the Archdiocese of Washington announced that former Cardinal Theodore McCarrick, the center of a major sexual abuse scandal in the Catholic church, would move to the rectory of St. Fidelis Parish in Victoria, Kansas. Vincke explained his decision to allow McCarrick to live in the diocese as showing mercy while pursuing justice. Vincke cite the story of Maria Goretti, a sainted girl who forgave her killer on her deathbed. In January 2020, the archdiocese announced that McCarrick, by then laicized, had moved to an undisclosed location

As of 2026, Vincke is the current bishop of Salina.

=== Sex abuse ===
Ron Gilardi, a Capuchin priest, was arrested in 2000 on charges of sexually assaulting a minor at Thomas More Prep-Marian High School in Hays during 1993. In May 2002, Gilardi pleaded guilty to indecent liberties with a child and was sentenced to 32 months in a treatment facility.

In April 2012, Allen Scheer, a priest in Salina, was charged with inappropriately touching a man. The victim was a vulnerable adult. Scheer pleaded guilty in August 2012 to misdemeanor battery. The Vatican laicized Scheer that same year.

== Bishops ==
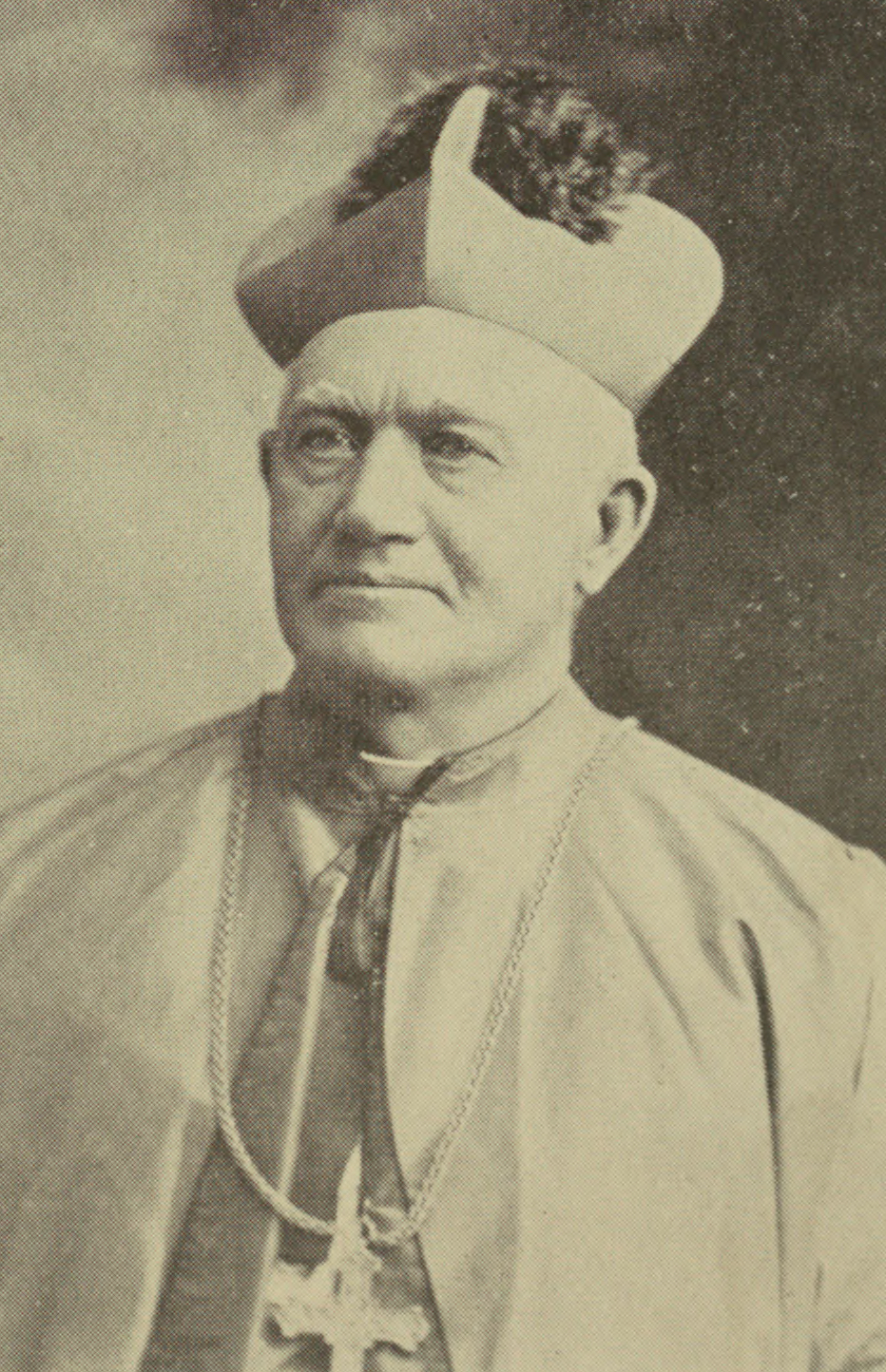
Bishop Cunningham (1903)

=== Bishops of Concordia ===
1. Richard Scannell (1887–1891), appointed Bishop of Omaha
2. Thaddeus J. Butler (1897) (died before consecration)
3. John F. Cunningham (1898–1919)
4. Francis Joseph Tief (1920–1938)
5. Francis Augustine Thill (1938–1957)

=== Bishops of Salina ===
1. Francis Augustine Thill (1938–1957)
2. Frederick William Freking (1957–1964), appointed Bishop of La Crosse
3. Cyril John Vogel (1965–1979)
4. Daniel Kucera (1980–1983), appointed Archbishop of Dubuque
5. George Kinzie Fitzsimons (1984–2004)
6. Paul Stagg Coakley (2004–2010), appointed Archbishop of Oklahoma City
7. Edward Joseph Weisenburger (2012–2017), appointed Bishop of Tucson
8. Gerald Lee Vincke (2018–present)

== Education ==
As of 2026, the Diocese of Salina has four high schools and 11 elementary schools.

== High schools ==
- Sacred Heart Jr - Sr High School – Salina
- St. John Catholic School – Beloit
- Thomas More Prep - Marian Jr/Sr High school – Hays
- Tipton Catholic High School – Tipton

== Ecclesiastical province ==
See: List of the Catholic bishops of the United States#Province of Kansas City
