= Francis Joseph Tief =

American prelate

His Excellency, The Most Reverend Francis Joseph Tief
- Bishop of Concordia; Titular Bishop of Nisa in Lycia
- Church: Roman Catholic Church
- See: Diocese of Concordia
- In office: April 6, 1921 – June 11, 1938
- Predecessor: John Francis Cunningham
- Successor: Francis Augustine Thill

Orders
- Ordination: June 13, 1908 by Charles H. Colton
- Consecration: March 30, 1921 by Thomas Francis Lillis

Personal details
- Born: March 7, 1881 Port Chester, New York, US
- Died: September 22, 1965 (aged 84) Port Chester, New York
- Education: Niagara University; St. Bonaventure College

Francis Joseph Tief (March 7, 1881 – September 22, 1965) was an American prelate of the Catholic Church. He served as bishop of the Diocese of Concordia in Kansas from 1921 to 1938.

== Biography ==
=== Early life ===
Francis Tief was born on March 7, 1881, in Port Chester, New York, to John and Catherine (née Glynn) Tief, both from Ireland. After studying at Niagara University in Lewiston, New York for one year, he attended St. Bonaventure College in Allegany, New York, obtaining his Bachelor of Arts degree in 1905.

=== Priesthood ===
Tief was ordained to the priesthood for the Diocese of Hartford by Bishop Charles H. Colton on June 13, 1908. He briefly served as a curate at Our Lady of Lourdes Parish in New York City before becoming the first resident pastor of Sacred Heart Parish in Webb City, Missouri. In 1910, he became rector of the Cathedral of the Immaculate Conception in Kansas City, Missouri. He was named vicar general of the Diocese of Kansas City in 1916.

=== Bishop of Concordia ===
On December 16, 1920, Tief was appointed the third bishop of Concordia by Pope Benedict XV. He received his episcopal consecration at the Cathedral of the Immaculate Conception on March 30, 1921, from Bishop Thomas Lillis, with Bishops Peter Muldoon and John Tihen serving as co-consecrators. He was installed at the Cathedral of Our Lady of Perpetual Help in Concordia on April 6, 1921.

During his tenure, Tief built or renovated eight churches, eight rectories, six schools, two convents, an elderly home, the Home of the Little Flower in Concordia (1924), St. Mary's Hospital in Manhattan, Kansas (1936), St. Joseph's College and Military Academy in Hays, Kansas (1931), and Marymount College in Salina, Kansas (1922). He ordained 28 priests, built a new episcopal residence and chancery in Concordia (1926–1927), and established the Northwestern Kansas Register as the diocesan newspaper in 1937. Tief also pioneered the religious vacation school movement which officially began in 1927.

=== Retirement and legacy ===
On June 11, 1938, Pope Pius XI accepted Tief's resignation due to poor health as bishop of Concordia and named him titular bishop of Nisa in Lycia. He retired to Port Chester, where he served as pastor of Sacred Heart Parish. Francis Tief died in Port Chester on September 22, 1965, at age 84.

Catholic Church titles
Preceded by John Francis Cunningham	Bishop of Concordia; 1921–1938	Succeeded by Francis Augustine Thill
