= Richard Scannell =

19th and 20th-century American Catholic bishop

His Excellency, The Right Reverend Richard Scannell
- Bishop of Omaha
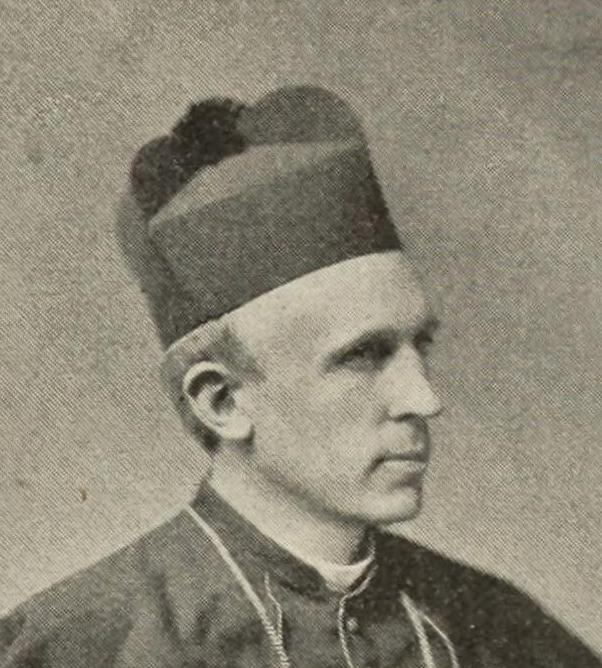
- Church: Catholic Church
- See: Diocese of Omaha
- In office: 30 January 1891 – 8 January 1916
- Predecessor: James O'Connor
- Successor: Jeremiah James Harty
- Previous posts: Bishop of Concordia (1887–1891)

Orders
- Ordination: 26 February 1871 by John Francis Whelan
- Consecration: 30 November 1887 by Patrick Feehan

Personal details
- Born: 12 May 1845 Cloyne, County Cork, Ireland
- Died: 8 January 1916 (aged 70) Omaha, Nebraska, US
- Education: All Hallows College
- Motto: Justitia et pax (Justice and peace)

Richard Scannell (12 May 1845 – 8 January 1916) was an Irish-born prelate of the Catholic Church. He served as bishop of the Diocese of Concordia in Kansas (1887–1891) and as bishop of the Diocese of Omaha in Nebraska (1891–1916).

== Biography ==
=== Early life ===
Richard Scannell was born on 12 May 1845, in Cloyne, County Cork, in Ireland to Patrick and Johanna (née Collins) Scannell. After completing his classical studies in a private school at Midleton, Ireland, he entered All Hallows College in Dublin in 1866.

=== Priesthood ===
Scannell was ordained to the priesthood by Bishop John Francis Whelan in Dublin for the Diocese of Nashville in Tennessee, on 26 February 1871. He arrived in the United States later in 1871 and was assigned by the diocese as a curate at Holy Rosary Cathedral Parish in Nashville. In 1878, he became pastor of St. Columba's Parish in East Nashville, Tennessee. He returned to the cathedral as rector in 1879.

Following the transfer of Bishop Patrick Feehan to the Archdiocese of Chicago, Scannell served as apostolic administrator for the diocese from 1880 to 1883. After a leave of absence for health reasons, he organized St. Joseph's Parish in West Nashville and built its church in 1885. In August 1886, Scannell was appointed vicar general of the diocese.

=== Bishop of Concordia ===
On 9 August 1887, Scannell was appointed as the first bishop of the newly erected Diocese of Concordia by Pope Leo XIII. He received his episcopal consecration on 30 November 1887, from Archbishop Feehan, with Bishops William McCloskey and Joseph Rademacher serving as co-consecrators, at St. Joseph's Church.

With only 20 resident pastors in Concordia and a growing Catholic population, Scannell attempted to solve the priest shortage by establishing a preparatory seminary in Belleville, Kansas, laying its cornerstone in June 1890. However, due to an economic depression, the seminary was never built and left a long-lasting debt. During his three-year-long tenure, Scannell also assisted the Sisters of St. Joseph to become permanently established in the diocese, erected fifteen churches, and increased the number of diocesan priests from five to twenty-two.

=== Bishop of Omaha ===
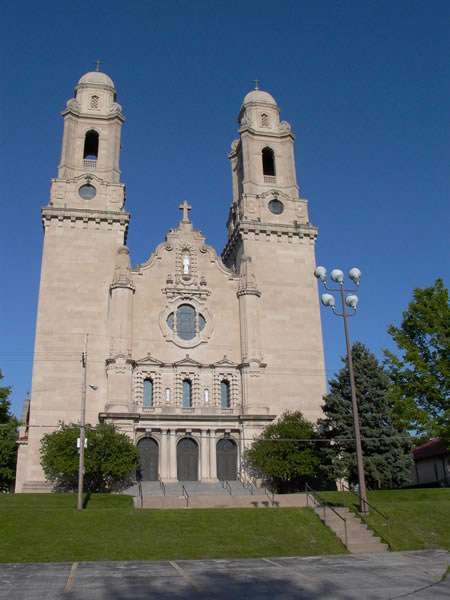
St. Cecilia Cathedral, Omaha, Nebraska (2007)

Scannell was named by Leo XIII to succeed Bishop James O'Connor as bishop of Omaha on 30 January 1891. Under his governance, the cornerstone of St. Cecilia Cathedral was laid in 1907. He also oversaw the diocese's expansion to 95 parishes, serving more than 80,000 Catholics. Parochial schools and diocesan priests more than doubled in number, and increases were also made among religious.

Scannell erected the Creighton Memorial St. Joseph's Hospital and St. Catherine's Hospital, both in Omaha, along with a home of the Good Shepherd. He also introduced the Third Order Regular of St. Francis, Sisters of St. Joseph, Presentation Sisters, Sisters of the Resurrection, Sisters of St. Benedict, Sisters of the Blessed Sacrament, Good Shepherd Sisters, the Dominicans, Felicians, Ursulines, and Franciscans to the diocese.

=== Death ===
Richard Scannell died on 8 January 1916, in Omaha at age 70.

Catholic Church titles
Preceded by None	Bishop of Concordia; 1887–1891	Succeeded by John Francis Cunningham
Preceded by James O'Connor	Bishop of Omaha; 1891–1916	Succeeded by Jeremiah James Harty
