= John Francis Cunningham (bishop) =

Irish-born prelate

His Excellency, The Right Reverend John Francis Cunningham
- Bishop of Concordia
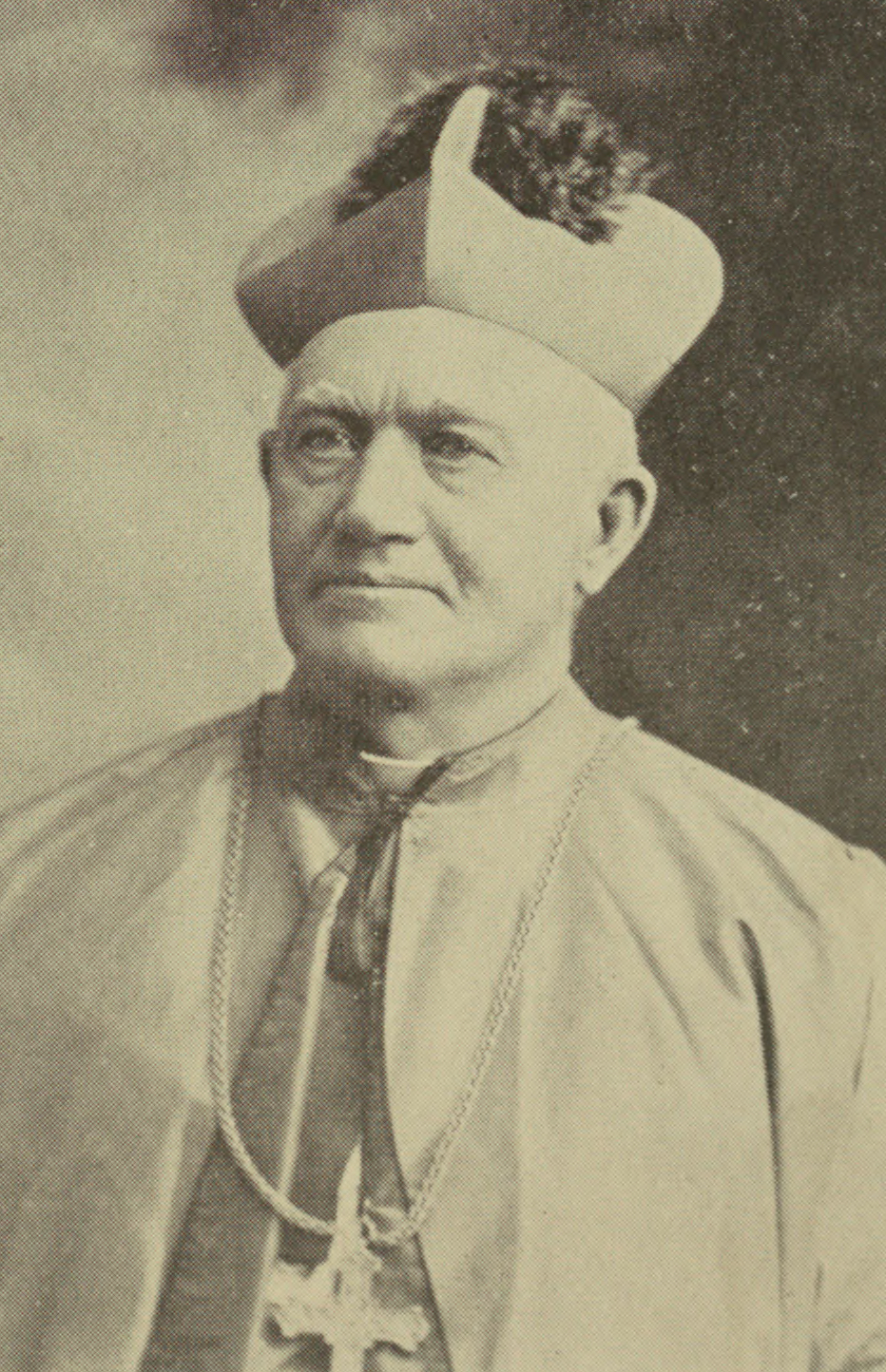
- Church: Catholic
- Diocese: Concordia
- Appointed: 14 May 1898
- In office: 1898 to 1919
- Predecessor: Richard Scannell
- Successor: Francis Joseph Tief

Orders
- Ordination: August 8, 1865 by John Baptist Miège
- Consecration: September 21, 1898 by John Joseph Kain

Personal details
- Born: June 20, 1842 Irremore, County Kerry, Ireland
- Died: June 23, 1919 (aged 77) Concordia, Kansas, US

John Francis Cunningham (June 20, 1842 – June 23, 1919) was an Irish-born prelate of the Roman Catholic Church. He served as bishop of Concordia in Kansas from 1898 until his death in 1919.

== Life ==
=== Early years ===
John Cunningham was born on June 20, 1842 in Irremore, County Kerry, in Ireland. He received his early education in Listowel in County Kerry. After coming to the United States in 1860, he enrolled at St. Benedict's College in Atchison, Kansas. He completed his theological studies at St. Francis' Seminary in Milwaukee, Wisconsin.

=== Priesthood ===
Cunningham was ordained to the priesthood in Leavenworth, Kansas, by Bishop John Baptiste Miège for the Diocese of Leavenworth on August 8, 1865. After his ordination, Bishop Louis Mary Fink tasked Cunningham with raising securing funds to pay off the remaining debt on Immaculate Conception Cathedral in Concordia. He was also asked to assist parishioners during the depressed economy of the period. In 1877, Cunningham was named pastor of Assumption Parish in Topeka, Kansas. Fink in 1881 appointed him as his vicar general and rector of Immaculate Conception.

=== Bishop of Concordia ===
On May 14, 1898, Cunningham was appointed the second bishop of Concordia by Pope Leo XIII. He received his episcopal consecration on September 21, 1898, from Archbishop John Joseph Kain, with Bishops John Joseph Hennessy and Thomas Bonacum serving as co-consecrators, at Leavenworth.

Described as the "Diocesan Builder," Cunningham erected 54 churches, 22 schools, and three hospitals during his tenure. He also dedicated Our Lady of Perpetual Help Cathedral in Concordia and laid the cornerstone for the Nazareth Motherhouse in 1902. He founded Hays Catholic College in Hays, Kansas, and St. Joseph's Orphanage, in addition to several rectories and convents.

=== Death ===
Cunningham died on June 23, 1919, after an extended illness, at age 76. He was buried in the Nazareth Cemetery at Concordia.

Catholic Church titles
Preceded by Richard Scannell	Bishop of Concordia; 1898–1919	Succeeded by Francis Joseph Tief
