= Diocese of Concordia, Kansas =

Former residential and current titular see of the Catholic Church

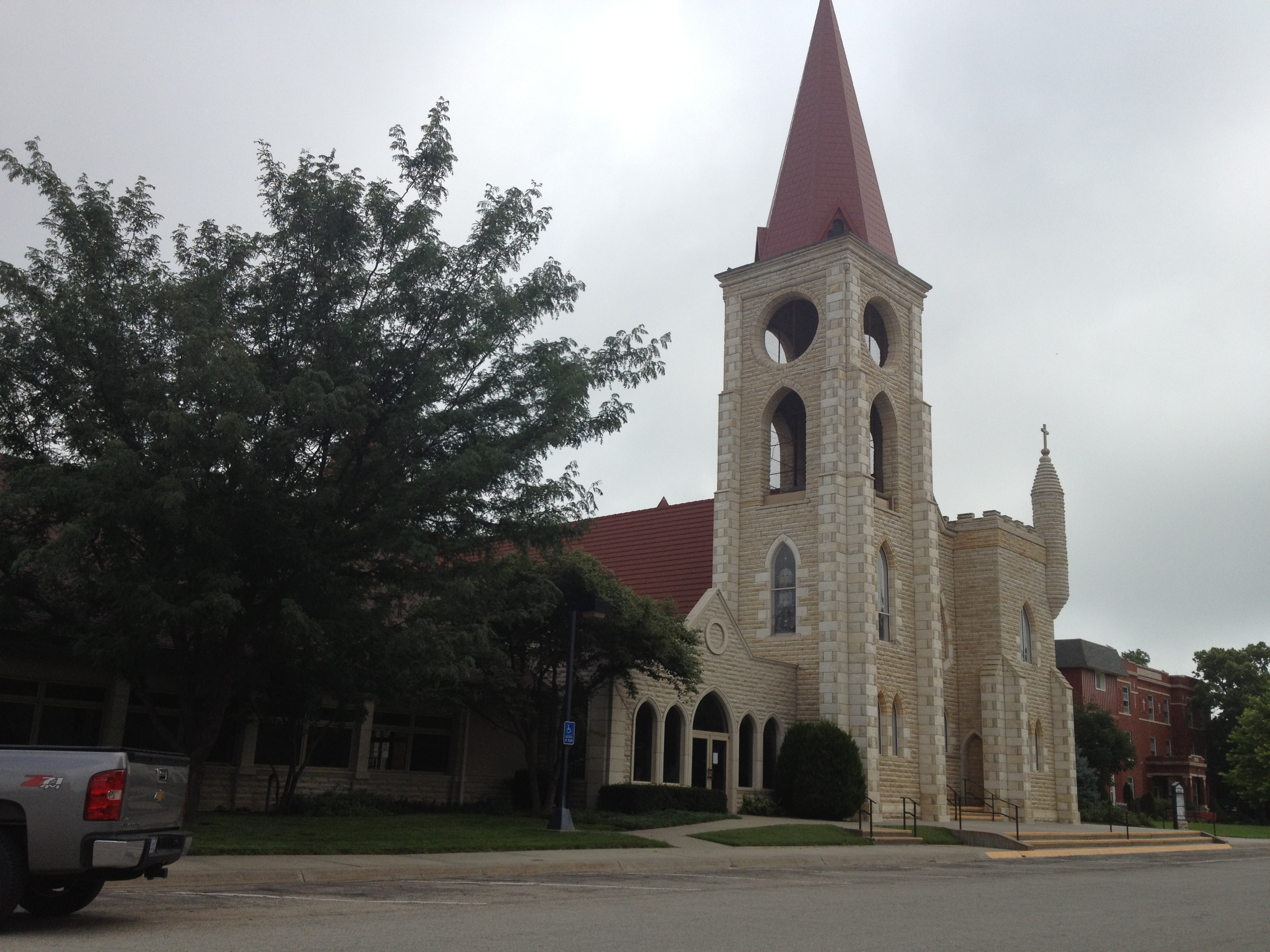
Our Lady of Perpetual Help Church in Concordia was the diocesan cathedral.

The Diocese of Concordia in America (Latin: Dioecesis Concordiensis in America) was founded on August 2, 1887, by Pope Leo XIII and based in Concordia, Kansas. On December 23, 1947, the Diocese was renamed the Roman Catholic Diocese of Salina. In 1995, the Diocese of Concordia was restored as a titular see. Its present title is held as a titular see.

The Latin adjective referring to this episcopal see is Concordiensis, while that referring to the Roman Catholic Diocese of Concordia, a residential see in Argentina, is Foroconcordianus.

== Titular bishops ==
- Antonio Sozzo
