= Sacred Heart Cathedral (Salina, Kansas) =

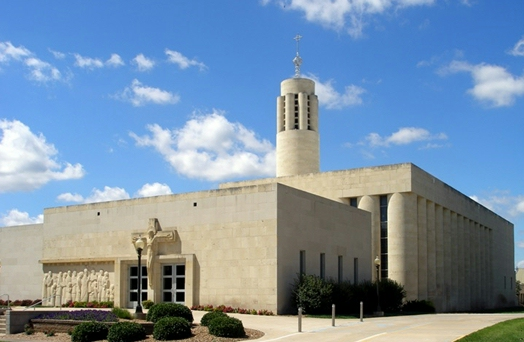

- Location in Kansas Sacred Heart Cathedral (the United States)
- 38°50′28″N 97°36′43″W
- Location: 118 N 9th St. Salina, Kansas
- Country: United States
- Denomination: Roman Catholic
- Website: www.shcathedral.com

History
- Status: Cathedral
- Dedication: Sacred Heart of Jesus

Architecture
- Architect: Edward J. Schulte
- Style: Modern
- Completed: 1953

Specifications
- Materials: Limestone

Administration
- Diocese: Salina

Clergy
- Bishop: Gerald Lee Vincke
- Rector: Rev. Fred Gatschet

Sacred Heart Cathedral in Salina, Kansas, United States is the cathedral and a parish church in the Catholic Diocese of Salina. It is the second cathedral for the diocese after Our Lady of Perpetual Help in Concordia, Kansas when the See was located there.

== History ==
The Diocese of Concordia was established by Pope Leo XIII on August 2, 1887. On December 23, 1944, Pope Pius XII transferred the See to Salina and Sacred Heart Church became the new cathedral. Edward J. Schulte of Cincinnati was chosen as the architect for a new cathedral church. The cornerstone was laid on June 4, 1951, and it was dedicated by Bishop Francis Thill on June 6, 1953. A renovation project in 1998 altered the interior and an enlarged gathering space and parish hall were added in 2000.

== Architecture ==
Sacred Heart Cathedral's architecture references the rural character of Northwestern Kansas and relates it to the Eucharistic aspects of the Catholic Church. Concrete grain elevators dot the landscape and contain the area's primary crop, wheat. The sides of the exterior of the cathedral are rounded and mimic the grain elevators and symbolize the Church as God's granary from which people are nourished by the Eucharist. The cathedral's bell tower is also round and reflects the shape of a farm silo. As farm animals gather to be nourished at the silo, so people gather within the church building for their spiritual nourishment from Christ, the Good Shepherd. The main entrance into the cathedral features a procession of the faithful in a bas relief. The figures represent a farm family, priests and religious who assist the bishop in carrying the cross. A Capuchin friar kneels before the cross in adoration. The panel carries a quote from the Bible, "He who does not take up his cross and follow me is not worthy of me."

The interior features a large baptismal font in the shape of the cross in the gathering space. Nearby is a triptych containing icons of the cathedral's patron the Sacred Heart of Jesus, and the diocese's primary patron Our Lady of Perpetual Help and St. Francis of Assisi, who is its secondary patron. The nave of the cathedral is lined with pillars that are 30 feet (9.1 m) around. At the base of the bell tower is a room that was formerly used as a baptistery. It now contains a shrine to Our Lady of Guadalupe. The statue in the chapel was from a small parish that closed in 1965. A bas relief of the Sacred Heart is featured on the back wall of the cathedral with a Latin phrase on its base, Cor Jesu, inflama cor nostrum amore tui (Heart of Jesus, inflame our hearts with your love). Twelve crosses with candles line the walls represent the Twelve Apostles and are where the walls were consecrated with Sacred Chrism when the cathedral was consecrated. The fourteen Stations of the Cross are etched into the east wall.

A 20-foot (6.1 m) tall crucifix dominates the sanctuary area. The circular canopy around the crucifix contains three Latin phrases: Cor Jesu, spes in te morientium (Heart of Jesus, hope of those who die in you); Domus Dei et porta coeli (House of God and gate of heaven); and Cor Jesu, omni laude dignissimum, salve in te sperantium (Heart of Jesus, most worthy of all praise, salvation of those who hope in you). The marble legs of the Altar were taken from the former communion rail and it contains the relics of St. Boniface and St. Clement. The Blessed Sacrament is housed in the chapel of the Blessed Virgin Mary.

The stained glass windows in the cathedral were designed by Anton Wendling from Aachen, Germany, and were assembled by Erhardt Stettner in Milwaukee, Wisconsin. The 25-foot (7.6 m) high windows depict various saints and cost $2,240.00 each. There are five smaller windows above the confessionals that cost $1,000 each.

== Pipe organ ==
The organ was originally built by George Kilgen and Son (Opus 3655) in 1926 in the previous Sacred Heart Church. It was rebuilt here when the cathedral was under construction in 1952. A new III Plein Jeu and an 8' Gemshorn were added at that time, as was a new three-manual console. However, the original two-manual console was still used for a time. The organ was rebuilt and altered by Larson Organ Co. of Marquette, Kansas in 1987. The original pipework was removed and placed into storage. Coombs Organ Specialists restored the organ in 2003 to its original specs with the original pipework. At the same time, they added a new three-manual Rodgers console with digital additions.

The pipe organ is located in the front of the cathedral near the altar. The pipes are located in a chamber on the side wall. There are no exposed pipes. It features a traditional style console in a fixed position with a roll top. It is equipped with electro-pneumatic (EP) chests. There are three manuals, 15 registers, and 17 ranks. The manual compass is 61 notes and the pedal compass is 32 notes. The stop keys are located above the top manual. It features balanced swell shoes/pedals with standard AGO placement, adjustable combination pistons, AGO Standard (concave radiating) pedalboard, crescendo pedal, reversible full organ/tutti thumb piston, reversible full organ/tutti toe stud, combination action thumb pistons, combination action toe studs, and coupler reversible thumb pistons.

Stoplist:

Great

- 8' Diapason 61
- 8' Flauto Primo 61
- 8' Gemshorn 61 (New)
- 4' Principal 12
- 4' Gemshorn 12
- 2-2/3' Quint
- 2' Super Octave

Swell

- 16' Bourdon 97
- 8' Diapason 73
- 8 Gedackt
- 8' Viole de Gamba 73
- 8' Viole Celeste 49
- 8' Aeoline 73
- 4' Flute D' Amour
- 2-2/3' Nazard
- 2' Flautino
- III Plein Jeu 183 (new)
- 8' Cornopean 73
- 8' Vox Humana 73
- 8' Oboe (Prep)
- Tremolo

Choir

- 8' Viola 73
- 8' Melodia 61
- 8' Dulciana 61
- 8' Unda Maris (Prep)
- 4' Flute 12
- 4' Dulcet 12
- 2-2/3' Dolce Nazard
- 2' Piccolo 12
- 1-3/5' Dolce Tierce
- 8' Clarinet (Prep)

Pedal

- 16' Diapason 12
- 16' Bourdon 32
- 16' Lieblich Gedeckt Swell
- 8' Diapason Great
- 8' Gedeckt Swell
- 8' Gemshorn Great
- 4' Principal Great
- 4' Block Floete Choir
- 8' Cornopean Swell

== See also ==
- List of Catholic cathedrals in the United States
- List of cathedrals in the United States
