= Enthronement =

Ceremony of inauguration involving a throne

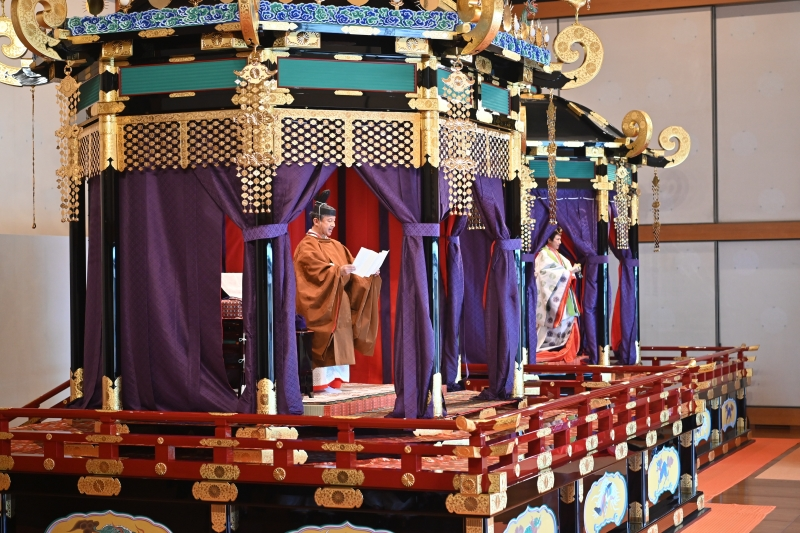
Enthronement of the Japanese emperor Naruhito (2019).

An enthronement is a ceremony of inauguration, involving a person—usually a monarch or religious leader—being formally seated for the first time upon their throne. Enthronements may also feature as part of a larger coronation rite.

In a general sense, an enthronement may also refer to a ceremony marking a monarch's accession, generally distinguished from a coronation as no crown or other regalia is physically bestowed upon the one being enthroned, although regalia may be present at the ceremony.

Enthronements occur in both church and state settings, since the throne is seen as a symbol of authority, both secular and spiritual.

== Religious ceremonies ==
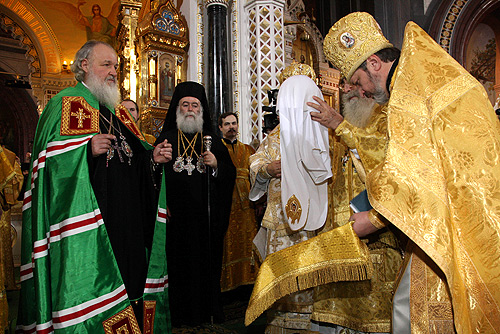
Enthronement of the Patriarch of Moscow and all Rus'.

Enthronements are most popular in religious settings, as a chair is seen as the symbol of the authority to teach. Thus in Christianity, bishops of almost all denominations have a ceremony of installation (or installment) after they assume office or by which they assume office. The Eastern Orthodox Church and the Oriental Orthodox Churches, as well as the Lutheran churches and the Anglican Communion often have elaborate ceremonies marking the inauguration of their episcopates. However, in the Catholic Church the rite of enthronement is limited to Eastern Catholic Churches. In these, enthronement is the rite by which a new bishop assumes authority over his eparchy and before which he is forbidden to intervene in its governance in any way, whether personally or by proxy. The overwhelmingly majority Latin Church of the Catholic Church has no ceremony of enthronement, although when a bishop is ordained in a church of the diocese he is to head, the principal consecrator invites him, after his investiture with mitre and crozier, to be seated on the cathedra of the church; if the ordination takes place elsewhere, the principal consecrator invites him merely to take first place among the concelebrating bishops. Instead of by enthronement, a Latin bishop takes office through an officially recorded presentation of the papal bull of his appointment, a ceremony that does not necessarily involve his personal presence. In the section in the Caeremoniale Episcoporum on "The Reception of a Bishop in His Cathedral Church" there is no mention of a ritual taking possession of the episcopal cathedra. The same is true even of older editions of this work.

== State ceremonies ==
Previously, most inaugural ceremonies marking the accession of a monarch took the form of a coronation rite, wherein the ruler was consecrated, physically crowned, and invested with other items of regalia.

Now that coronations are no longer being practiced in most monarchies (most nations require only that their monarchs take an oath upon accession), the term enthronement may be used by some to describe ceremonies surrounding the monarch's accession, including their oath-taking, since the "throne" (physical or symbolic) of the monarch remains.

While no Norwegian monarch has been crowned in nearly a century, Olav V instituted a "consecration" ceremony, wherein he received the church's blessing, to inaugurate his reign. This practice was also followed by his son Harald V. The formal inauguration ceremony of monarchs of Japan, Sweden, Belgium and the Netherlands take on many different forms and are also known as "enthronements" in a broader sense. However, the term "coronation" is still sometimes used to describe these ceremonies, even though they are not coronations in the truest sense of the word.

=== Belgium ===
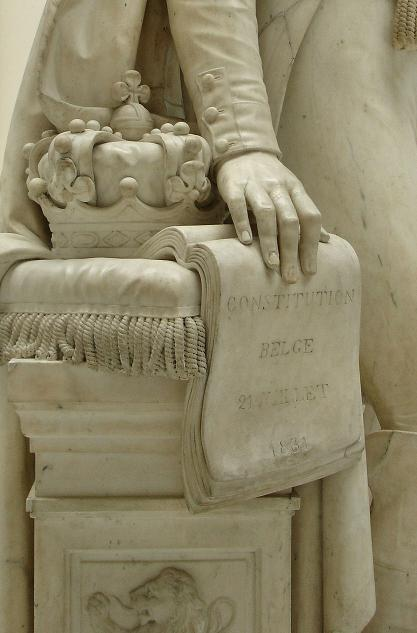
The heraldic Belgian crown, symbolically resting on the constitution on a statue of Leopold I.

Belgium has no physical crown (except as a heraldic emblem); the formal installation of a Belgian monarch requires only a solemn oath be taken on the constitution in the parliament, symbolic of the limited power allowed to the king under the 1831 Constitution. During the enthronement of King Albert II, a member of the Chamber of Representatives, Jean-Pierre Van Rossem, shouted out "Long live the Republic of Europe!", only to be shouted down by the others, who cried "Vive le Roi!". A similar protest had occurred during the 1950 enthronement of King Baudouin.

=== Japan ===
The Emperor of Japan attends an enthronement ceremony soon after his accession; the last such ritual was held in 2019 for Emperor Naruhito. The Imperial Regalia consist of a sword, known as Kusanagi, a jewel, known as Yasakani no magatama, and a mirror, called Yata no Kagami. From Emperor Shōmu in the 8th century to Emperor Kōmei, the benkan, influenced by the Chinese mianguan, was used in the enthronement ceremonies of Japanese emperors. From Emperor Meiji to the present, the more Japanese style ryūei no kan (立纓冠; lit. 'crown with standing tail ornament') has been used in enthronement ceremonies.

This ancient rite was held in Kyoto, the former capital of Japan, until 1990 when the enthronement ceremony for Emperor Akihito took place at the Imperial Palace in Tokyo. The ceremony is not public, and the regalia are generally seen only by the emperor himself and a few Shinto priests. However, an account in Time from the enthronement of Akihito's father Hirohito in 1928 reveals a few details. First is a three-hour ceremony in which the emperor ritually informed his ancestors that he had assumed the throne. This was followed by the enthronement itself, which took place in an enclosure called the Takamikura, which contained a great square pedestal upholding three octagonal pedestals topped by a simple chair. This was surrounded by an octagonal pavilion with curtains, surmounted by a great golden phoenix.

The new emperor proceeded to the chair, where after being seated, the Kusanagi and Yasakani no magatama were placed on stands next to him. A simple shaku (a flat wooden baton or sceptre) was presented to the monarch, who faced his Prime Minister standing in an adjacent courtyard, representing the Japanese people. The emperor offered an address announcing his accession to the throne, calling upon his subjects to single-mindedly assist him in attaining all of his aspirations. The Prime Minister replied with an address promising fidelity and devotion, followed by three shouts of "Banzai" from all of those present. The timing of this last event was synchronized, so that Japanese around the world could join in the "Banzai" shout at precisely the moment that it was being offered in Kyoto. In 1990 after the shouts of Banzai, a 21 gun salute fired out from the grounds of the palace a short distance away.

After this ceremony, the new Emperor gave offerings to Amaterasu, offering rice specially prepared for the occasion. This was followed by three banquets and a visit to the shrines of his ancestors.

=== Luxembourg ===
The Grand Duke of Luxembourg is enthroned at a ceremony held in the Chamber of Deputies marking the beginning of their reign. The monarch takes an oath of loyalty to the constitution, and later attends a solemn mass at the Notre-Dame Cathedral. No crown or other regalia exists for the rulers of the world's last sovereign Grand Duchy.

=== Malaysia ===
The new ruler of Malaysia is enthroned in a special ceremony after his election, which involves the use of several items of regalia including the Tengkolok Diraja, or Royal Headdress. According to legend, the first Sultan of Perak forswore the wearing of any diadems after the miraculous refloating of his ship, which had run aground during his journey to establish his reign in Perak. Hence, while Malaysian coronations are rather elaborate affairs, they do not involve the imposition of a crown.

The new king proceeds into the Istana Negara Throne Hall at the head of a large procession also consisting of his spouse, specially-picked soldiers carrying the royal regalia, and other notables including the Grand Chamberlain, or Datuk Paduka Maharaja Lela. The king and his wife are seated upon their thrones, and the regalia are brought forward. Following this, the Datuk Paduka Maharaja Lela brings forward a copy of the Quran, which the new monarch reverently receives, kisses, and places on a special table located between his throne and the queen's. A formal proclamation of the new king's reign is read, followed by the taking of a special coronation oath. The Prime Minister gives a special speech, which is followed by an address by the new king from the throne. A prayer is said, the Quran is returned to the Chamberlain, and the ceremony is completed.

=== Spain ===
No monarch of Spain has been physically crowned since John I of Castile and Ferdinand I of Aragon. Instead, the new monarch appears at the Cortes, where he or she takes a formal oath to uphold the Constitution. Although the crown is visibly present at the ceremony, it is never actually placed on the monarch's head. Five days after his visit to the Cortes, Spanish King Juan Carlos I attended an "Enthronement Mass" at the Church of San Jerónimo el Real in Madrid. Accompanied by his wife Sofia, he was escorted beneath a canopy to a set of thrones set up near the high altar. Following the service, the King and queen returned to the palace, where they greeted the people from the balcony, reviewed troops, and attended a formal banquet.

Historically, Castilian coronations were performed at Toledo, or in the Church of St Jerome at Madrid, with the king being anointed by the archbishop of Toledo. The monarch assumed the royal sword, sceptre, crown of gold and the apple of gold, after receiving his anointing. Aragonese coronations were performed at Zaragoza by the Archbishop of Tarragona.

=== Sweden ===
In Sweden, no monarch has been crowned since Oscar II in 1873. Kings Carl XVI Gustaf and Gustaf VI Adolf have instead just been enthroned in a simple ceremony in Rikssalen at the Royal Palace in Stockholm on September 19, 1973, and October 30, 1950, respectively. The regalia were displayed on cushions to the right and left of the royal Silver Throne, but were never worn by the King, who made an accession speech, which was the main purpose of the undertaking.

== Gallery ==
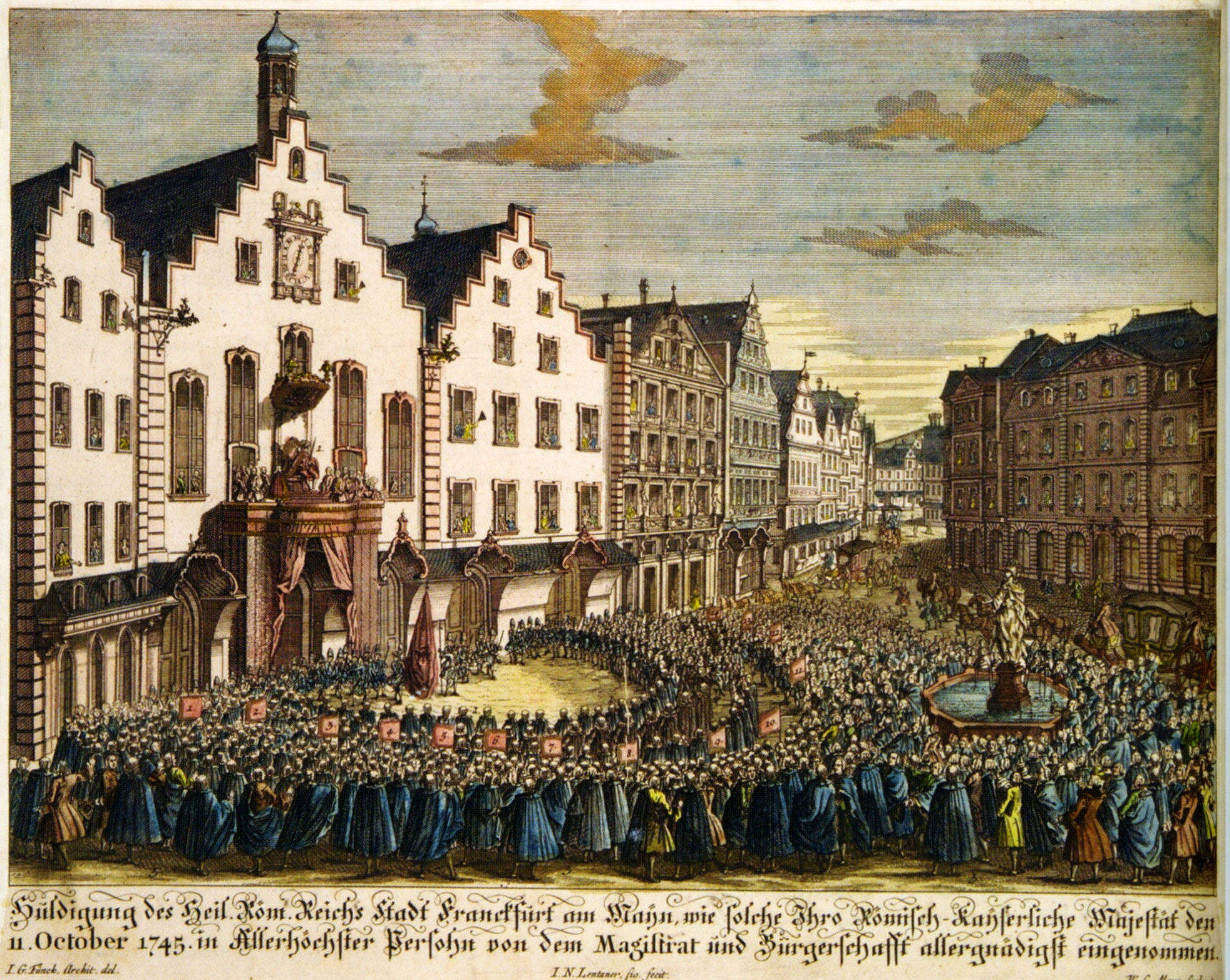
Oath of Enthronement of Emperor Francis I (1749)

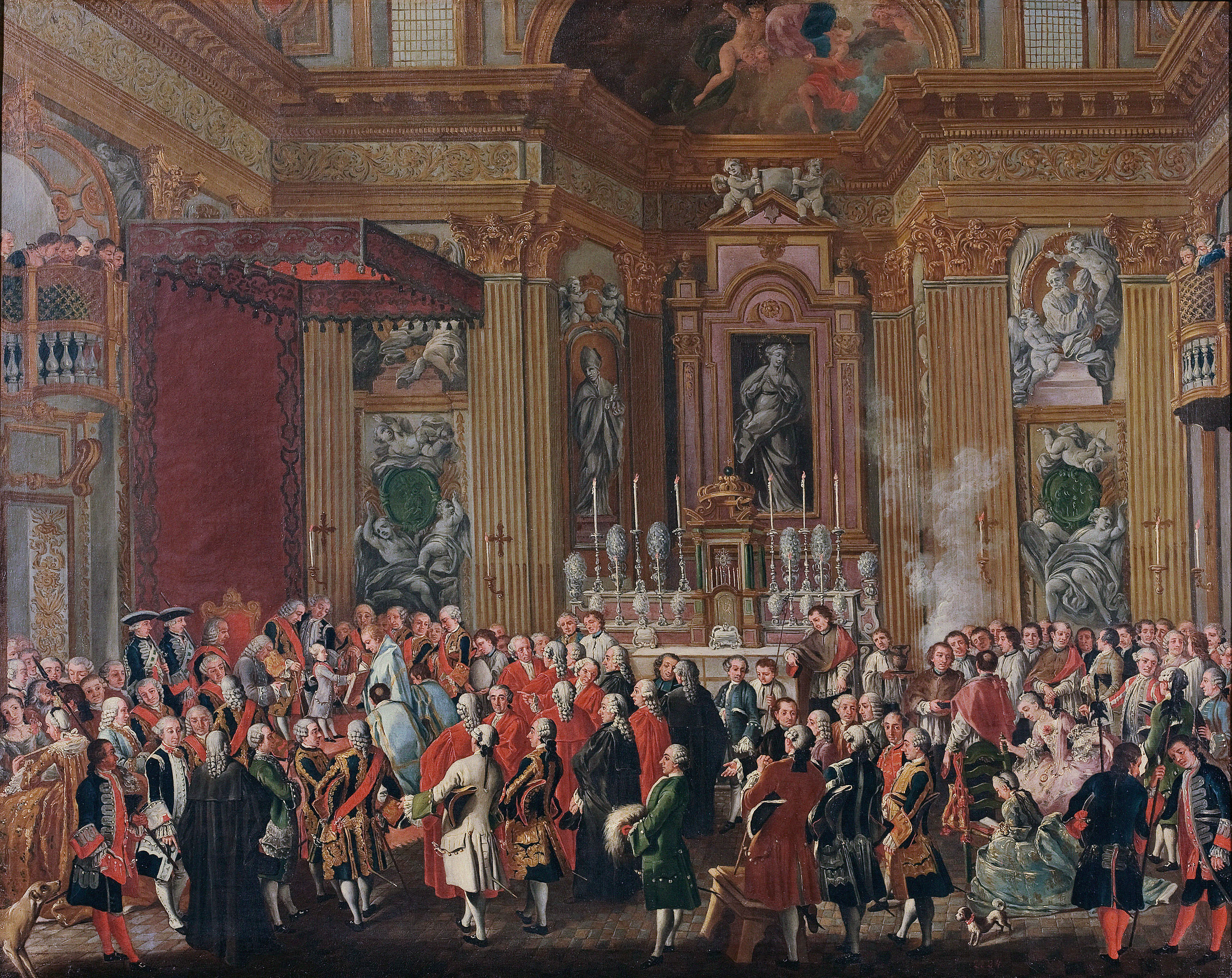
Oath of Enthronement of King Ferdinand IV of Bourbon (1759)

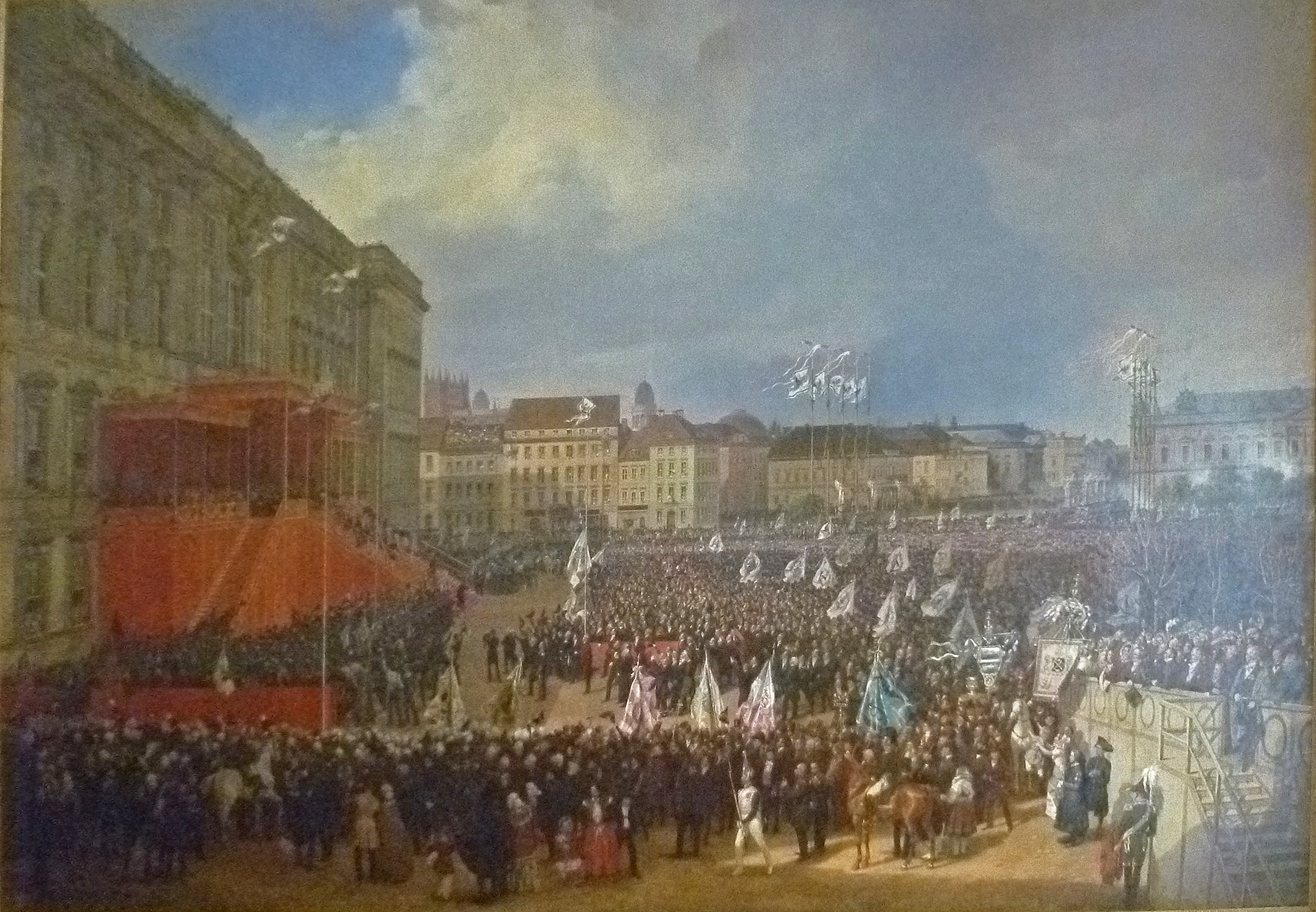
Oath of Enthronement by King Friedrich Wilhelm IV (1840)

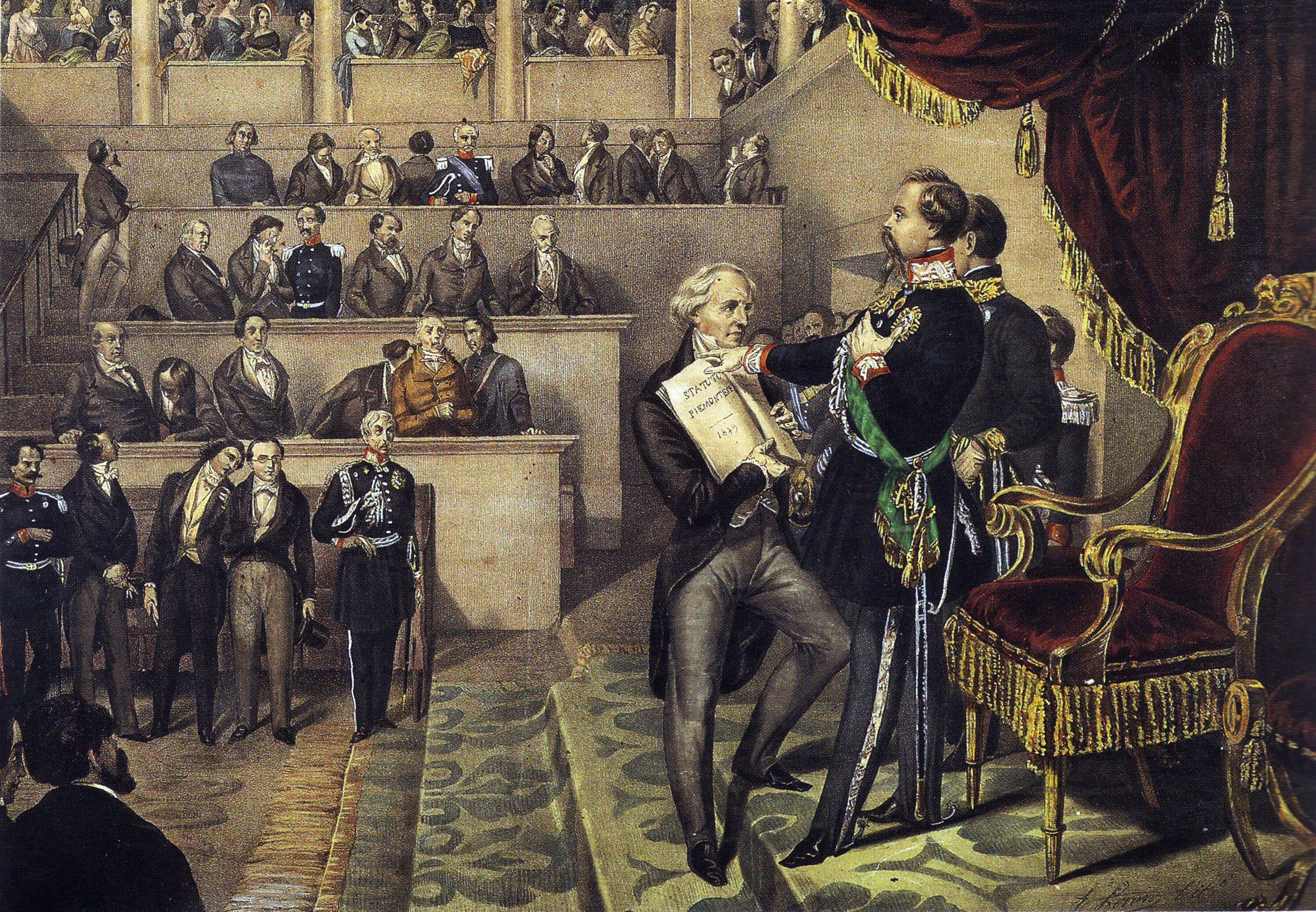
Oath of Enthronement by King Vittorio Emanuele II (1849)

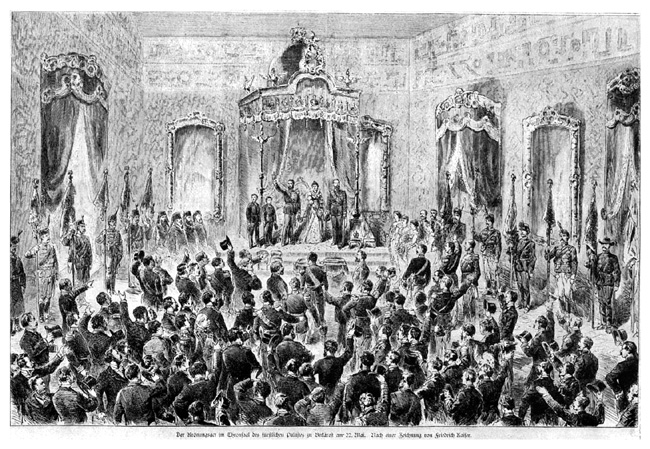
Oath of Enthronement of King Charles I of Romania (1881)

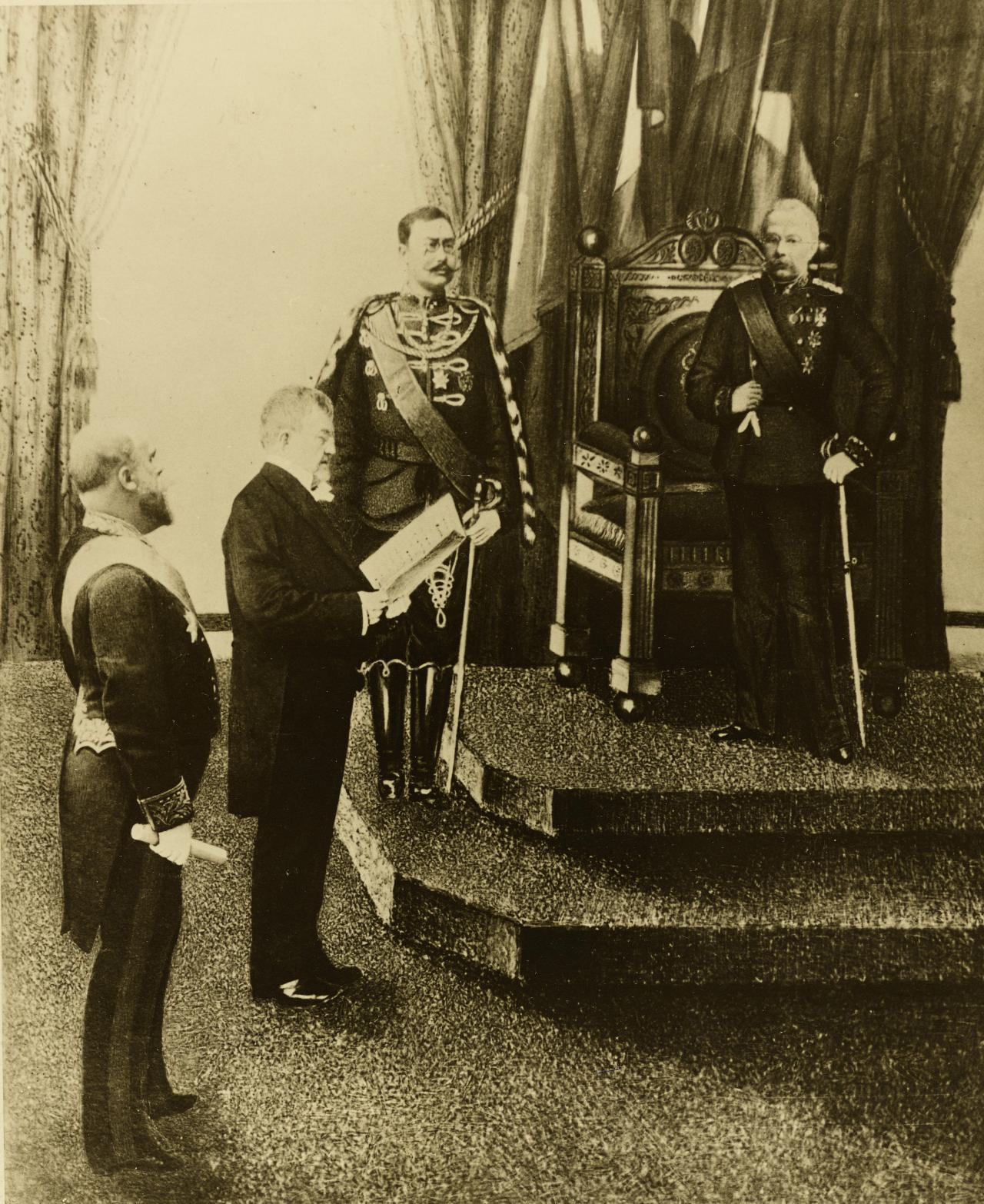
Oath of Enthronement by Grand Duke Adolphe (1889)

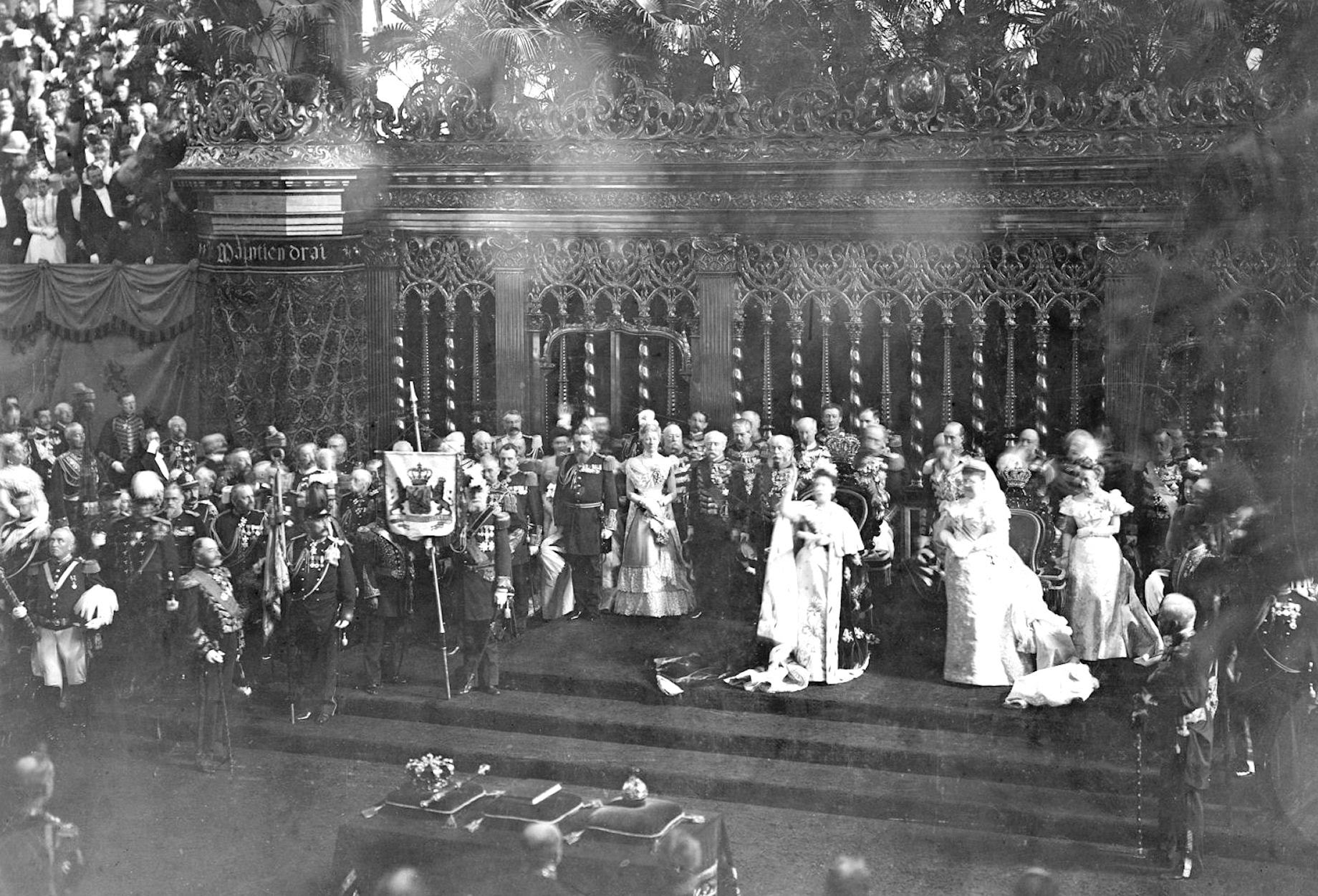
Oath of Enthronement by Queen Wilhelmina (1898)

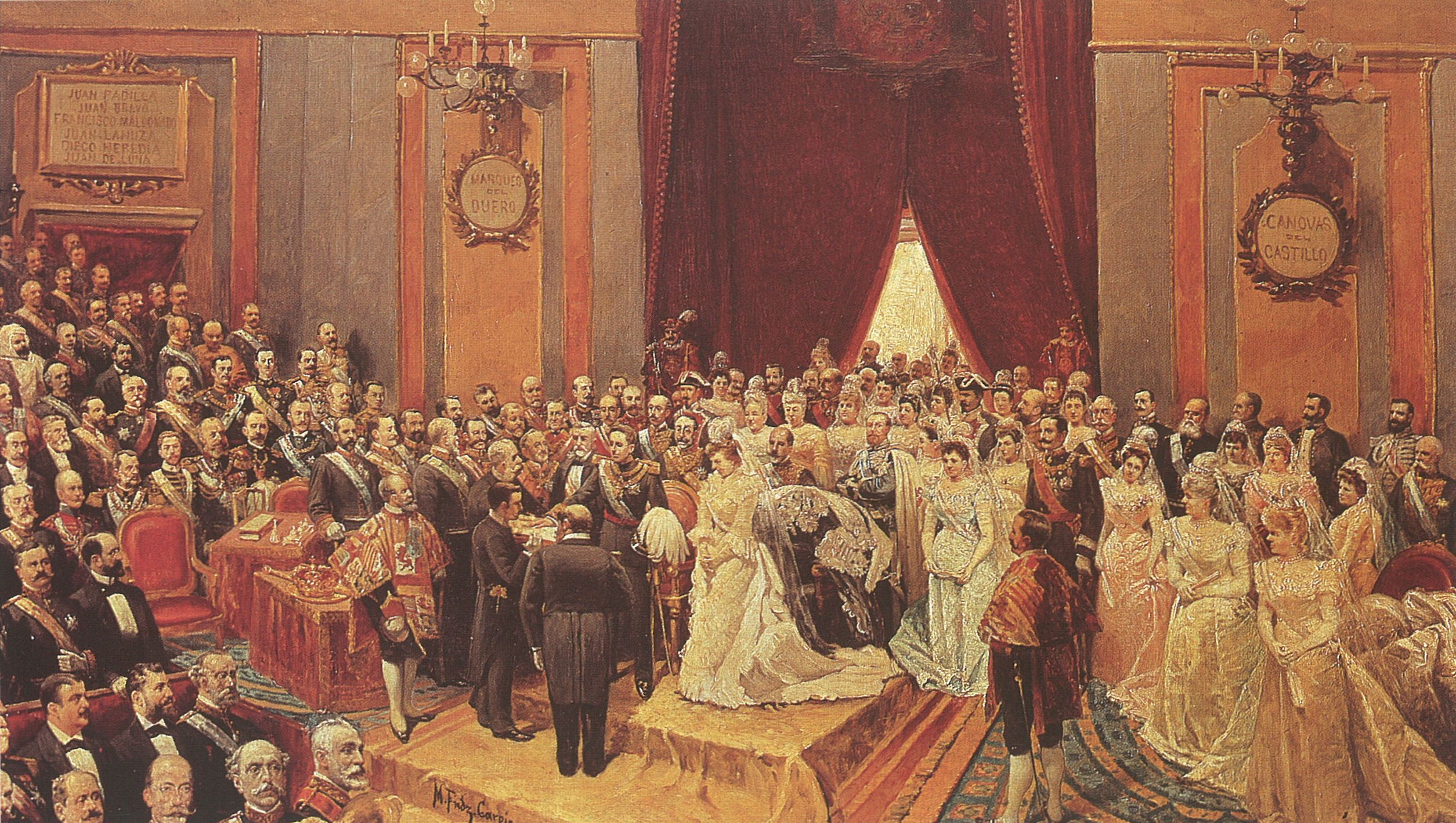
Oath of Enthronement of King Alfonso XIII (1902)

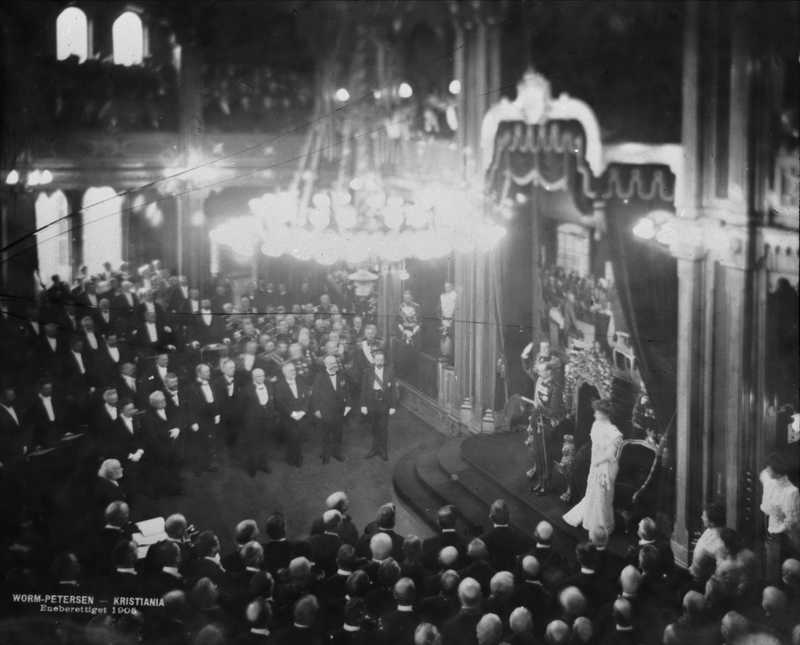
Oath of Enthronement of King Haakon VII (1905)

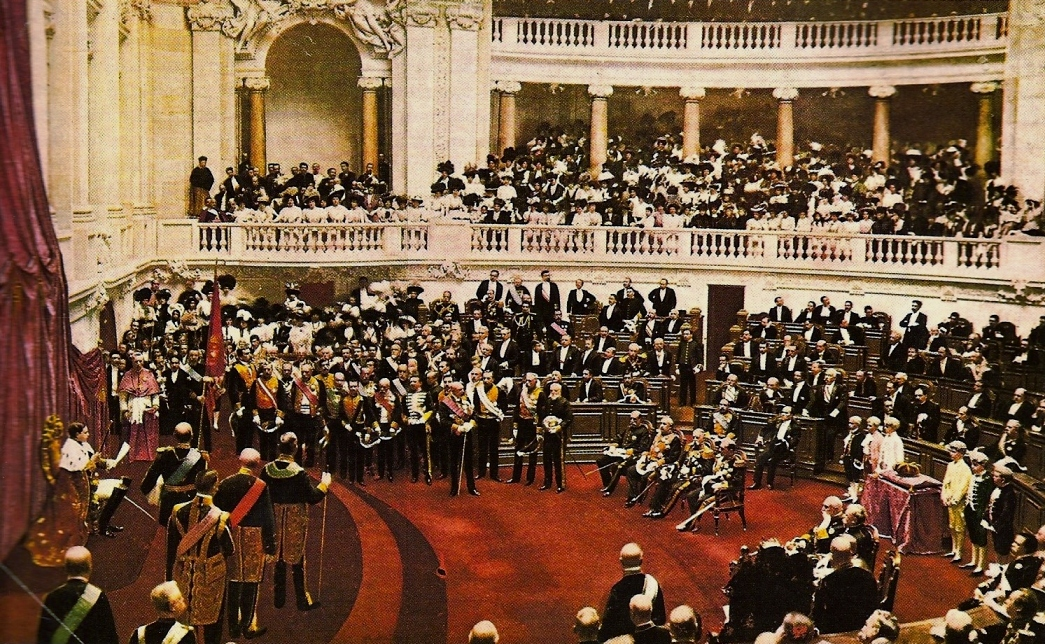
Oath of Enthronement of King Manuel II (1908)

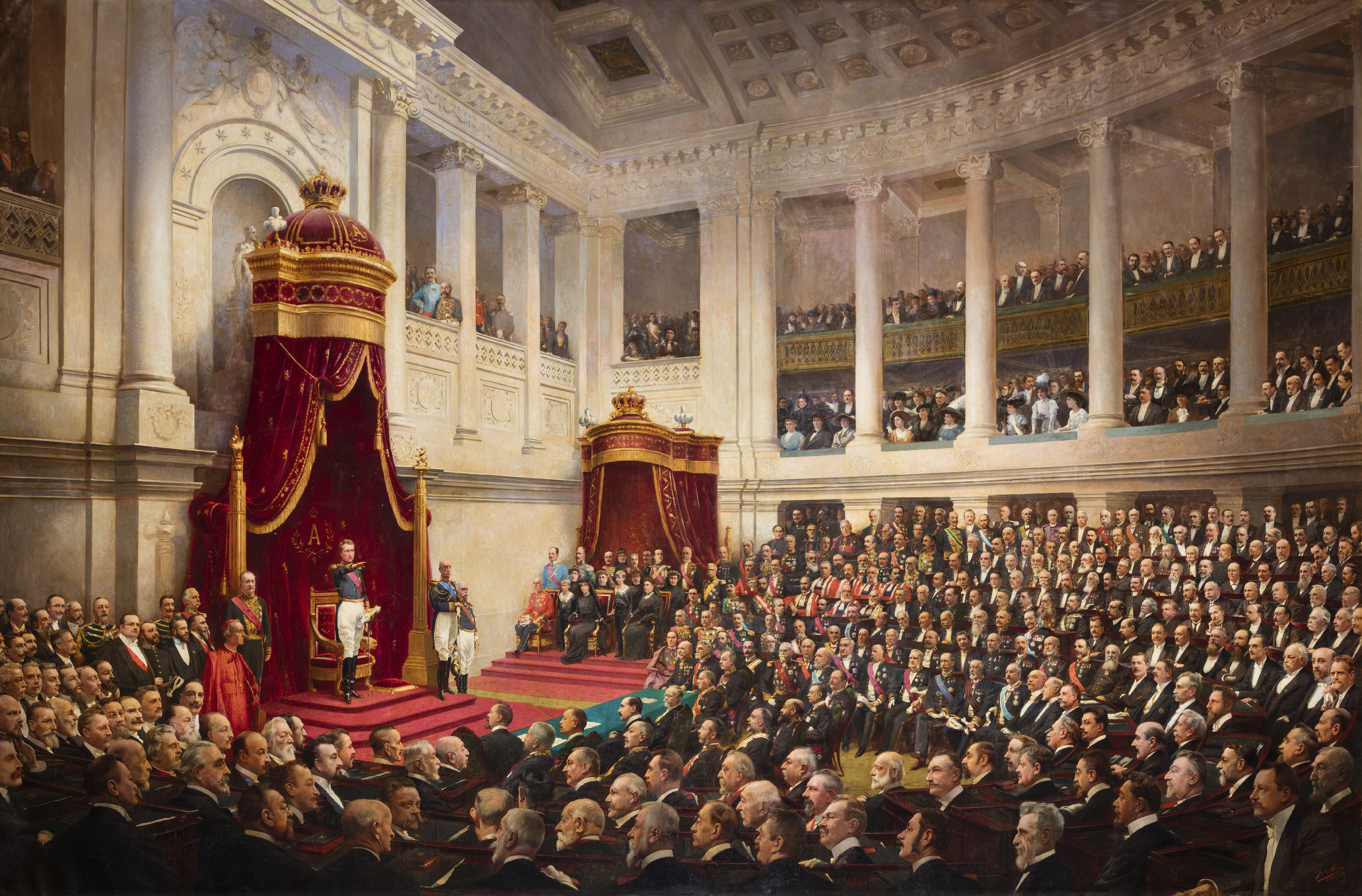
Oath of Enthronement of King albert I (1909)

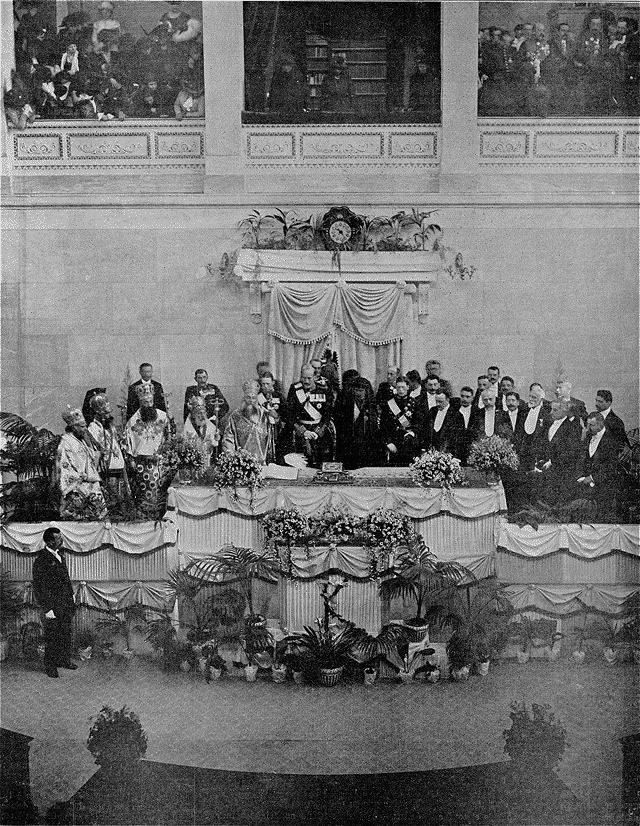
Oath of Enthronement of King Costantine I (1913)

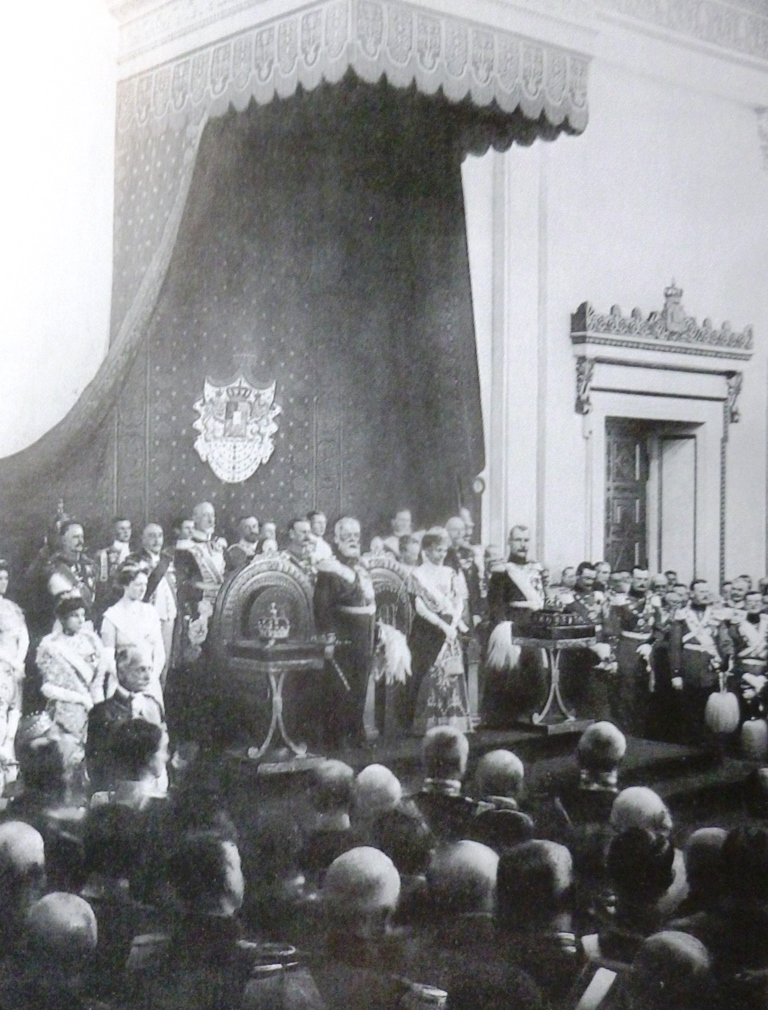
Oath of Enthronement of King Ludwig III of Bavaria (1913)

== See also ==
- Coronation, anointing, and investiture
- Throne of England of the Monarchs of England
- Dragon Throne of the Emperors of China
- Chrysanthemum Throne of the Emperors of Japan
- Phoenix Throne of the Kings of Korea
- Lion Throne of the Dalai Lamas of Tibet
- Peacock Throne of the Mughal Empire
- Peacock Throne of the Persian Empire
- Golden Stool of the Asantehenes of Asanteman, Ghana
- The Crown
- Silver Throne of the Kingdom of Sweden
