= Kilian Caspar Flasch =

German-born prelate

His Excellency, The Most Reverend Kilian Caspar Flasch
- Bishop of La Crosse
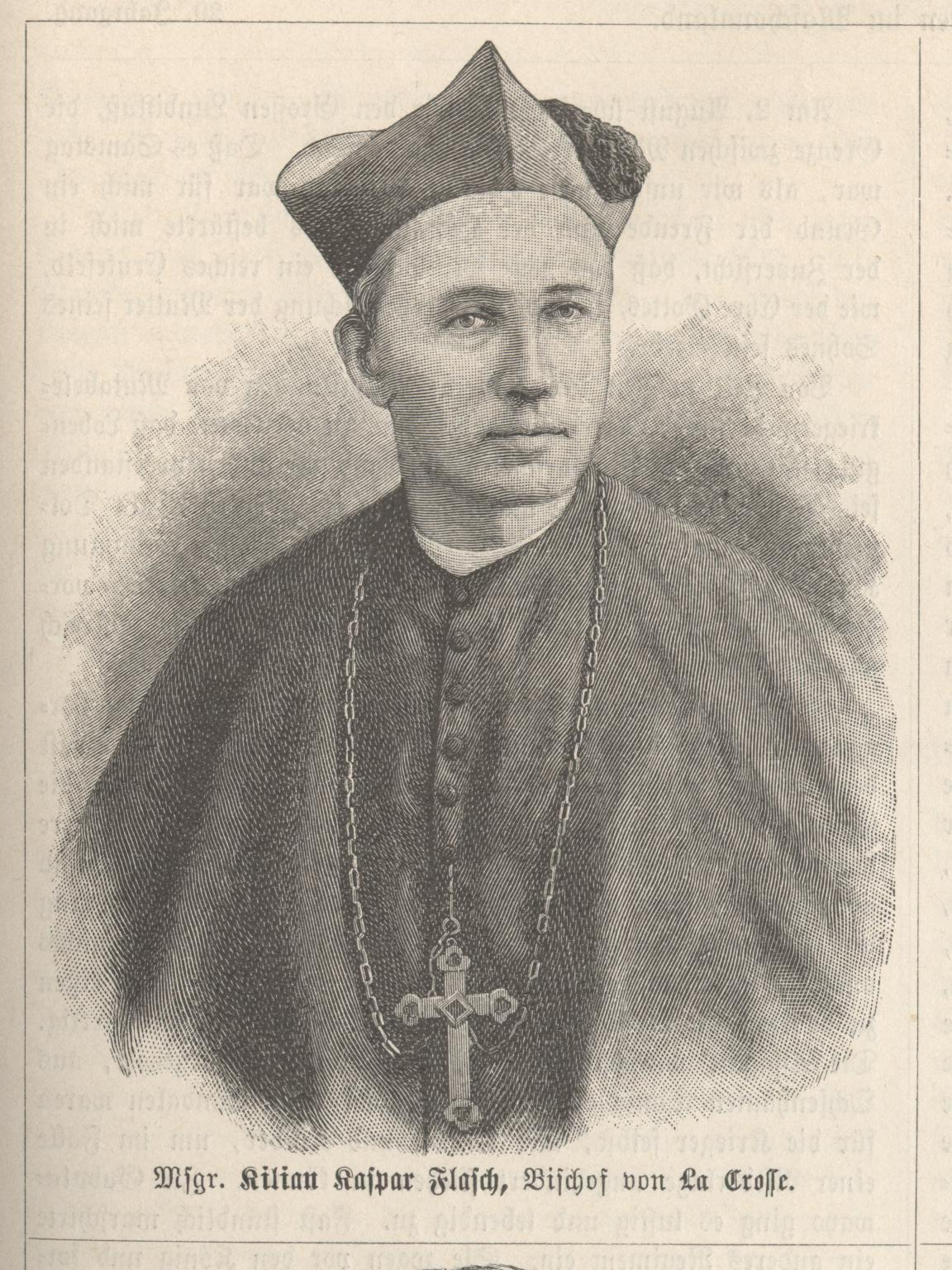
- Engraving published in Die Katholischen Missionen
- See: Diocese of LaCrosse
- Installed: September 1, 1881
- Term ended: August 3, 1891
- Predecessor: Michael Heiss
- Successor: James Schwebach

Orders
- Ordination: December 16, 1859
- Consecration: August 24, 1881

Personal details
- Born: July 16, 1831 Retzstadt, Kingdom of Bavaria
- Died: August 3, 1891 (aged 60) La Crosse, Wisconsin, US
- Denomination: Catholic Church
- Education: College of Notre Dame; Saint Vincent Seminary

Kilian Caspar Flasch (July 16, 1831 – August 3, 1891) was a German-born prelate of the Roman Catholic Church who served as bishop of the Diocese of La Crosse in Wisconsin from 1881 until his death in 1891.

== Biography ==
=== Early life and education ===
Kilian Flasch was born at Retzstadt, in the Main-Spessart district of the Kingdom of Bavaria (now part of Germany) to Andreas and Anna Margareta (née Giesuebel) Flasch. One of ten children, he was his parents' fourth child and second son; he was the only son who survived infancy.

He was raised on his family's farm and received his early education at neighboring schools. In 1847, his family sold their farm and immigrated to the United States, settling in Fond du Lac, Wisconsin. Flasch entered the College of Notre Dame in South Bend, Indiana, and continued his studies at St. Vincent Seminary in Latrobe, Pennsylvania. In 1856, he returned to Wisconsin and enrolled at the newly opened St. Francis Seminary in Milwaukee. He completed his studies at St. Francis, where he was a member of the first graduating class.

=== Priesthood and ministry ===
Flasch was ordained to the priesthood for the Archdiocese of Milwaukee by Bishop John Henni on December 16, 1859. He celebrated his first mass at the chapel of the School Sisters of Notre Dame, of which three of his sisters were members, in Milwaukee the following Sunday.

Flasch's first assignment was as pastor of St. Stephen Parish in New Coeln, Wisconsin, which included the mission of St. James Church in Oak Creek, Wisconsin. From 1860 to 1863, he served as the first resident pastor of St. Louis Church in Caledonia. In October 1860, Flasch was appointed professor of moral theology and master of discipline at St. Francis Seminary. He remained at the seminary until the spring of 1865, when he became a chaplain and instructor at a convent of the Franciscan Sisters of Perpetual Adoration in Jefferson, Wisconsin due to ill health. Flasch briefly resumed his duties at the seminary before being named pastor of St. Mary's Visitation Parish in Elm Grove, Wisconsin in May 1867.

During his seven-year tenure, he constructed a new church building and rectory, and ministered to an orphanage. He returned to St. Francis Seminary in November 1874, where he resumed his post as professor of moral theology in addition to becoming spiritual director. From 1879 to 1881, Flasch served as rector of the seminary.

=== Bishop of La Crosse ===
On June 14, 1881, Flasch was appointed the second bishop of the Diocese of La Crosse by Pope Leo XIII. He received his episcopal consecration on August 24, 1881, from Archbishop Michael Heiss, with Bishops Francis Krautbauer and Rupert Seidenbusch serving as co-consecrators, at the chapel of St. Francis Seminary. He was installed on September 1.

Flasch made his first ad limina visit to Rome in 1883. He attended the Third Plenary Council of Baltimore in 1884, serving as a member of the Committee on Schools. An outspoken supporter of Catholic education, he established 36 new schools during his tenure and, at the Plenary Council, unsuccessfully sought to require Catholic parents to send their children to parochial schools. However, he originally opposed creating a national Catholic university but later served on the Board of Trustees for the Catholic University of America. He presided over the second diocesan synod of La Crosse in 1887, and created over 60 new parishes.

Because of his poor health, Flasch traveled to Chatawa, Mississippi, in March 1891 to recuperate. The trip proved unsuccessful and Kilian Flasch returned to La Crosse, where he died on August 3, 1891, at age 60.

== See also ==
- Catholic Church hierarchy
- Catholic Church in the United States
- Historical list of the Catholic bishops of the United States
- List of Catholic bishops of the United States
- Lists of patriarchs, archbishops, and bishops

Catholic Church titles
Preceded by Michael Heiss	Bishop of La Crosse; 1881–1891	Succeeded by James Schwebach
