= James Schwebach =

Luxembourgish-born prelate

His Excellency, The Most Reverend James Schwebach
- Bishop of La Crosse
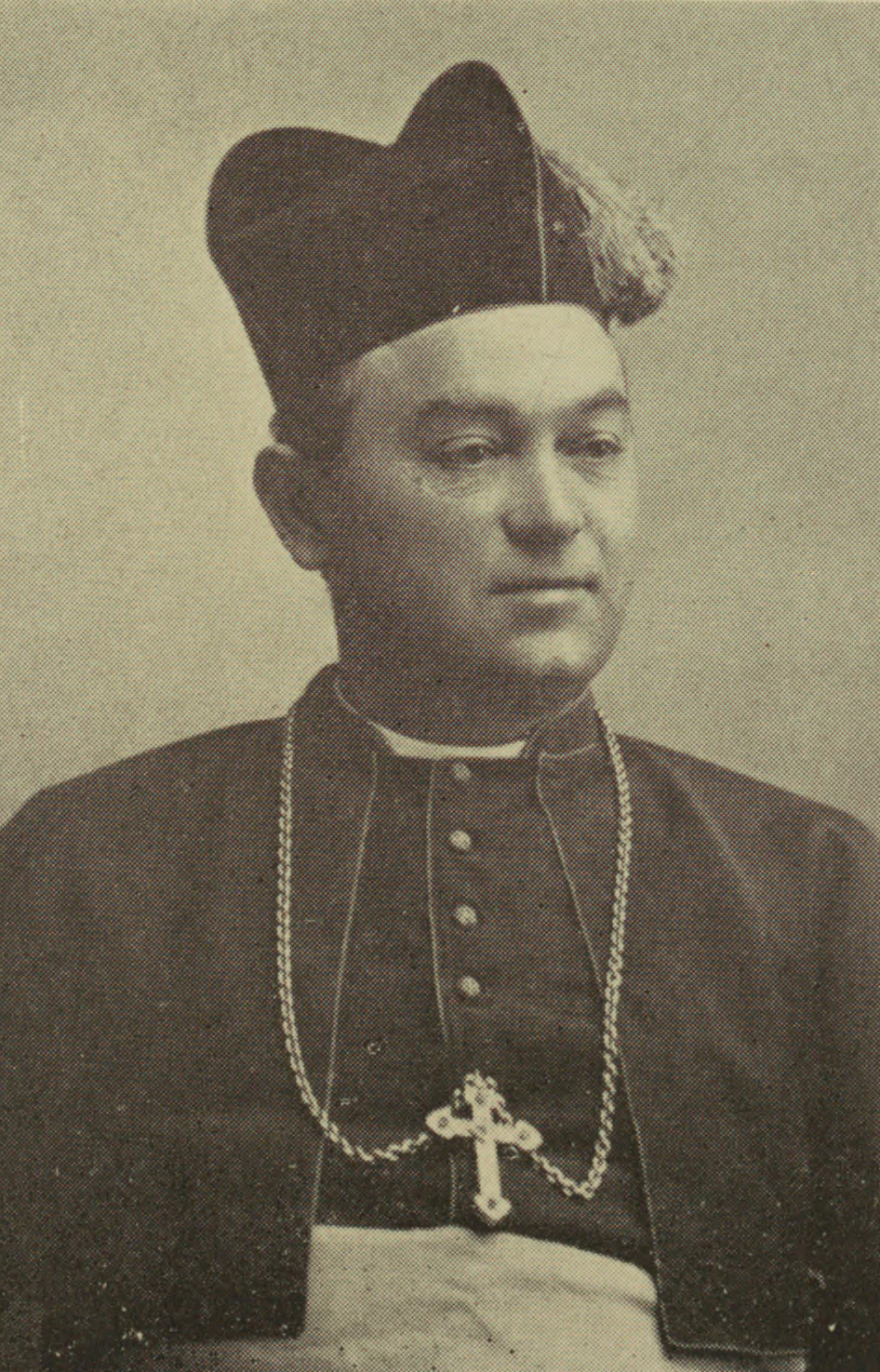
- Diocese: Diocese of La Crosse
- Installed: February 25, 1892
- Term ended: June 6, 1921
- Predecessor: Kilian Caspar Flasch
- Successor: Alexander Joseph McGavick

Orders
- Ordination: June 16, 1870 by Thomas Grace
- Consecration: February 25, 1892 by Frederick Katzer

Personal details
- Born: August 15, 1847 Platen, Préizerdaul, Luxembourg
- Died: June 6, 1921 (aged 73) La Crosse, Wisconsin, US
- Denomination: Catholic Church
- Education: St. Francis Seminary

James Schwebach (August 15, 1847 – June 6, 1921) was a Luxembourgish-born prelate of the Roman Catholic Church who served as Bishop of the Diocese of La Crosse in Wisconsin from 1892 until his death in 1921.

== Biography ==
=== Early life and education ===
James Schwebach was born on August 15, 1847, at Platen in the Préizerdaul commune of the Grand Duchy of Luxembourg, to Nicholas Joseph and Margaret (née Busch) Schwebach. He received his early education from private tutors, and afterwards studied at the college of Diekirch for two years.

In 1864, Schwebach immigrated to the United States, where he entered St. Francis Seminary in Milwaukee, Wisconsin. He there completed his studies in philosophy and theology in five years. At age 21, being too young for ordination to the priesthood, Schwebach was called to La Crosse and was there ordained a deacon by Bishop Michael Heiss on July 24, 1869. He then served at St. Mary's Parish in La Crosse, where he preached in English, French, and German and taught at the parochial school.

=== Priesthood and ministry ===
Schwebach was ordained a priest for the Diocese of La Crosse by Bishop Thomas Grace on June 16, 1870. He then served as pastor of St. Mary's for 22 years, during which time he erected a new church, school, and rectory. He also built St. James the Less Parish in 1887. In addition to his pastoral duties, Schwebach served as vicar general of the diocese from 1882 to 1892.

=== Bishop of La Crosse ===
On December 14, 1891, Schwebach was appointed the third bishop of the Diocese of La Crosse by Pope Leo XIII. He received his episcopal consecration on February 25, 1892, from Archbishop Frederick Katzer, with Bishops John Janssen and Joseph Cotter serving as co-consecrators. During his 29-year tenure, he became known as a builder and founded St. Michael's Home for orphans.

James Schwebach died in La Crosse on June 6, 1921, at age 73. He is buried at the Cathedral of St. Joseph the Workman in La Crosse.

== See also ==
- Catholic Church hierarchy
- Catholic Church in the United States
- Historical list of the Catholic bishops of the United States
- List of Catholic bishops of the United States
- Lists of patriarchs, archbishops, and bishops

Catholic Church titles
Preceded by Kilan Caspar Flasch	Bishop of La Crosse; 1891–1921	Succeeded by Alexander Joseph McGavick
