= Préizerdaul =

- Commune
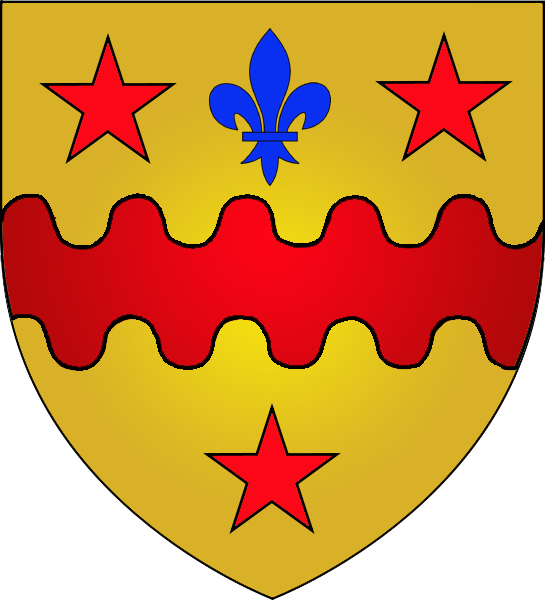
- Coat of arms

- Map of Luxembourg with Préizerdaul highlighted in orange, and the canton in dark red
- Coordinates: 49.7942°N 5.9375°E
- Country: Luxembourg
- Canton: Redange

Government
  - Mayor: Marc Gergen

Area
  - Total: 15.6 km^{2} (6.0 sq mi)
  - Rank: 72nd of 100
- Highest elevation: 402 m (1,319 ft)
  - Rank: 48th of 100
- Lowest elevation: 255 m (837 ft)
  - Rank: 58th of 100

Population (2025)
  - Total: 1,834
  - Rank: 86th of 100
  - Density: 118/km^{2} (304/sq mi)
  - Rank: 65th of 100
- Time zone: UTC+1 (CET)
  - Summer (DST): UTC+2 (CEST)
- LAU 2: LU0000702
- Website: preizerdaul.lu

Préizerdaul (Luxembourgish pronunciation: [ˈpʀɜɪ̯tsɐdɑʊ̯l]) is a commune in western Luxembourg, in the canton of Redange. Until 17 July 2001, it was known as Bettborn, after its administrative centre. Préizerdaul was the first commune to change its name since before the First World War; to date, it is the only commune to have changed its name to a name of Luxembourgish origin.

Towns within the commune include Bettborn, Platen, Pratz, and Reimberg.

== Population ==
Historical population

| Year | Pop. | ±% |
|---|---|---|
| 1821 | 850 | — |
| 1851 | 1,321 | +55.4% |
| 1900 | 1,051 | −20.4% |
| 1910 | 964 | −8.3% |
| 1922 | 931 | −3.4% |
| 1935 | 899 | −3.4% |

| Year | Pop. | ±% |
|---|---|---|
| 1947 | 859 | −4.4% |
| 1960 | 742 | −13.6% |
| 1970 | 745 | +0.4% |
| 1981 | 809 | +8.6% |
| 1990 | 879 | +8.7% |
| 2000 | 1,292 | +47.0% |

| Year | Pop. | ±% |
|---|---|---|
| 2005 | 1,303 | +0.9% |
| 2010 | 1,372 | +5.3% |
| 2015 | 1,593 | +16.1% |
| 2020 | 1,698 | +6.6% |
| 2021 | 1,725 | +1.6% |

Source data

== Notable people ==
- Emile Calmes (born 1954 in Luxembourg City), a Luxembourgish politician; became Mayor of Préizerdaul in 1982
- Marie Schreiber (born 2003 in Bettborn), a Luxembourgish professional racing cyclist
- James Schwebach (1847 in Platen – 1921) a Luxembourgish prelate of the Roman Catholic Church & Bishop of the Diocese of La Crosse in Wisconsin, 1892/1921

== Twin towns ==
Préizerdaul is twinned with:

- Péni, Burkina Faso
- San Agustín, El Salvador
