= Emile Calmes =

Luxembourgish politician

Emile Calmes (born 3 October 1954 in Luxembourg City) is a Luxembourgish politician. He served as Mayor of Préizerdaul from 1982 to 2011 and as a member of the Chamber of Deputies from 1989 to 2007. He has been a member of the Democratic Party (DP) since 1982.

In 1982, Calmes became Mayor of Préizerdaul (then named 'Bettborn'), in north-western Luxembourg. He entered the Chamber of Deputies at the 1989 election, running in the Nord constituency, which includes Préizerdaul. He was re-elected in 1994. In the 1999 legislative elections, he placed second on the DP list (behind only Charles Goerens), with two being elected. In 2004, Calmes came second again, with the DP falling back from their high-water mark in 1999, but the DP managed to hold on to their second seat in Nord, allowing Calmes to take his seat in the Chamber once more.

Calmes stepped down from the Chamber on 19 December 2007. He ascribed this to wanting to give his successor, Fernand Etgen, time to experience the Chamber ahead of the 2009 legislative election, which Calmes had already decided not to contest. He has remained on as mayor of Préizerdaul, and intends to step down at the 2011 local elections.
