= St. Rose of Viterbo Convent =

Historic church in Wisconsin, United States

- Mary of the Angels Chapel
- U.S. National Register of Historic Places
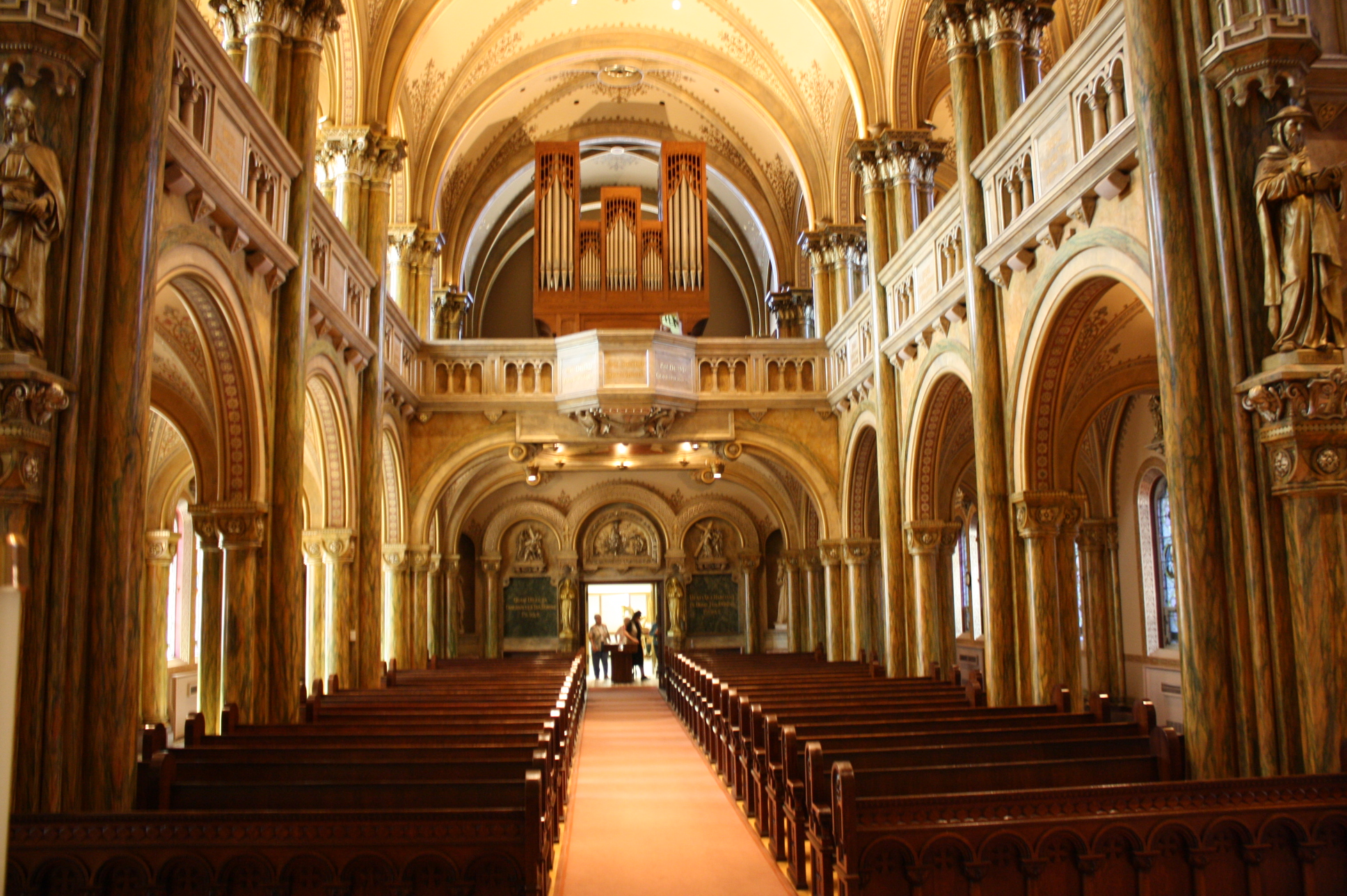
- Interior of the chapel

- Location within Wisconsin Location within the United States
- Location: 901 Franciscan Way, La Crosse, Wisconsin, United States
- Coordinates: 43°48′14″N 91°14′37″W
- Area: less than one acre
- Built: 1906
- Architect: Liebert, Eugene R. & Leibig, Adolph
- Architectural style: Romanesque
- NRHP reference No.: 06000204
- Added to NRHP: March 29, 2006

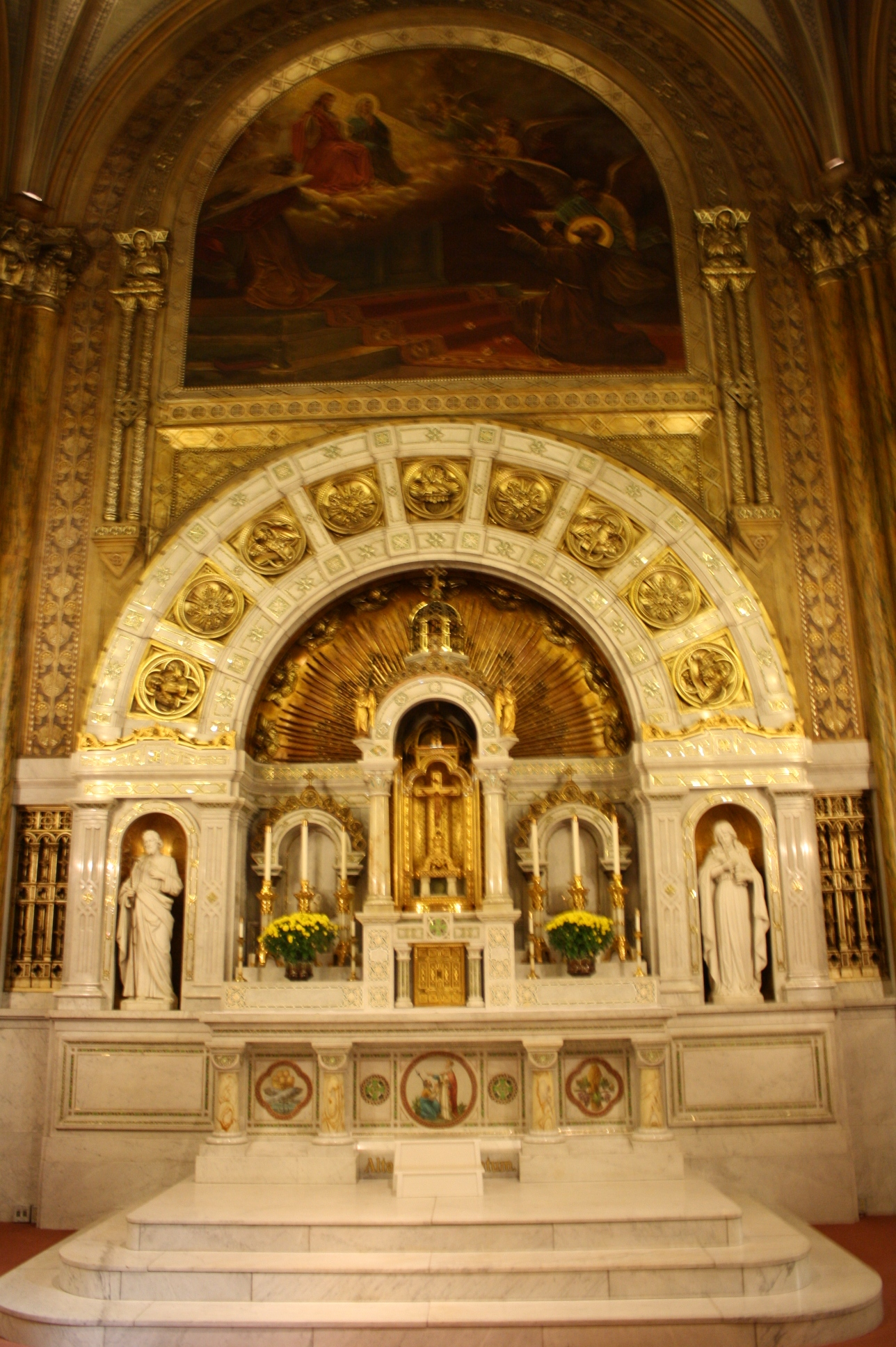
Altar featuring Tadeusz Żukotyński painting

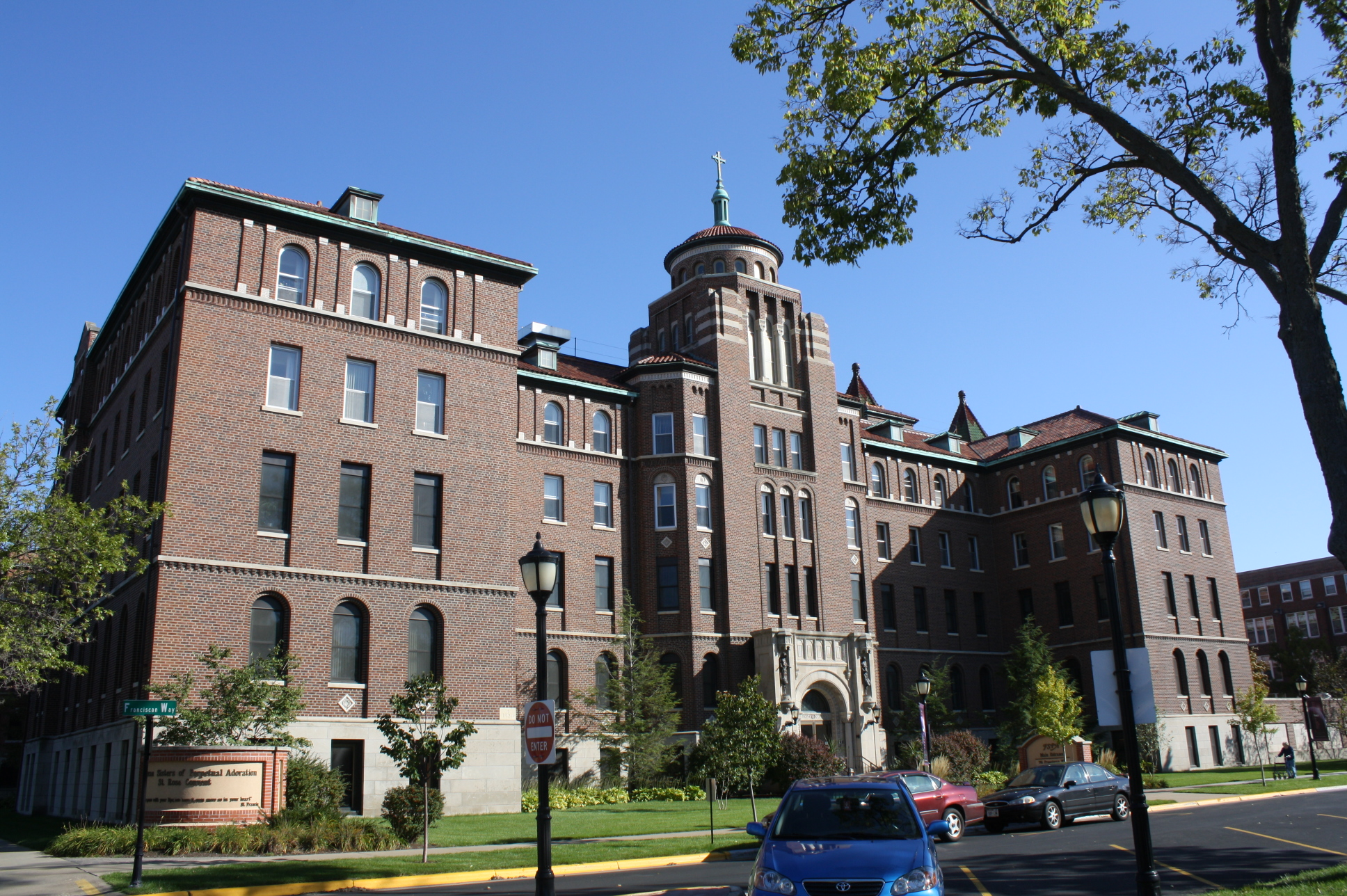
Facade of the convent

St. Rose of Viterbo Convent is the motherhouse of the Franciscan Sisters of Perpetual Adoration, an American religious congregation, which is located in La Crosse, Wisconsin. The convent is dedicated to Rose of Viterbo, a 13th-century Franciscan tertiary who was a noted mystic and street preacher in Italy who died while still a teenager.

The convent contains three chapels, of which one, Mary of the Angels Chapel, is listed on the National Register of Historic Places of the United States. Another, the Adoration Chapel, is the site of perpetual adoration of the Blessed Sacrament, was the site of 141 years of uninterrupted practice of the Sisters from August 1, 1878 to February 2020. The sisters continue to pray in shifts between 6 a.m. and 10 p.m.

== History ==
The central portion of the convent was built in 1871, when the Sisters moved their motherhouse from Jefferson, Wisconsin, at the invitation of Michael Heiss, Bishop of the newly established Diocese of La Crosse. The convent was initially built both as the administrative center of the congregation and also as a secondary school for girls. With the growing numbers of members of the congregation and of the student body, two wings were added to the initial building which were completed in 1914.

The original convent building was gutted by a fire on December 2, 1923, which collapsed its roof and the two upper floors its annex on Market Street. At the time, the convent was home to 135 sisters, one of whom died in the fire. According to the sisters' records, the fire was first noticed at 11:30 a.m. in the dumbwaiter shaft connected to the kitchen. It took the fire department at least 20 minutes to arrive after the alarm had been sounded, by which point the flames had spread. It wasn't until 2 p.m. that the fire was contained, and it was finally extinguished at 6 p.m. Although the convent building was directly adjacent to the Chapel, the chapel was spared from the flames and sisters continued their practice of perpetual prayer while the neighboring building was on fire. The cause of the fire was never determined, though the city's fire chief suspected there had been a short circuit in the wiring near the roof. At the time, it caused an estimated $175,000 worth of damage, and rebuilding the convent took two years.

The convent was renovated in 1996, adding two closed porches to the rear of the building. A recent renovation effort which began in 2018 aimed to make the facilities more accessible, by adding an elevator in addition to several access-ways and an accessibility ramp. The renovation also sought to make the building more environmentally efficient by replacing old systems with modern, lower consumption alternatives. Nearly half of the building's interior space was remodeled, much of which was private rooms for sisters and guests.

== Mary of the Angels Chapel ==
The Sisters built the first Chapel of Mary of the Angels (Latin: Maria Angelorum) to serve their own spiritual needs and that of their students. It was dedicated on August 2, 1873, the Feast of the Dedication of the Basilica of Our Lady of the Angels in Assisi, Italy, the first home of the Franciscan Order. In 1903, they began construction on a new chapel, designed by Eugene R. Liebert, which was completed on August 2, 1906. Thaddeus von Zukotynski was the artist for the oil-on-canvas painting located immediately above the main altar of the chapel. This work shows St. Francis of Assisi, founder of the Franciscan Order, at prayer in the Porziuncola, having a famous vision of Jesus and Mary in which he was granted the Porziuncula Indulgence.

This chapel, along with the Adoration Chapel, have over 100 windows of Munich-style stained glass created by the Royal Bavarian Stained Glass Factory in Munich, Germany. Bulletproof glass was installed outside all the stained-glass windows after a BB pellet was shot through a piece depicting Jesus, near his hand.

The statues and altar in the chapel are largely carved from Carrara marble, though its pillars and walls are faux-marble and were elaborately painted in a 19-step process to make them appear so. The main altar painting in the Chapel depicts Saint Francis of Assisi kneeling before Jesus and Mary. The altar steps in the painting are a replica of those in the chapel itself, as it used to have red carpet like that in the painting.

The chapel was restored in 1992. As of 2014, more than 4,500 people tour the chapels annually.

== See also ==
- Franciscan Sisters of Perpetual Adoration
- Viterbo University

== Sources ==
- Zimmerman, H. Russell, The architecture of Eugene Liebert: Teutonic style in the American midwest, 2006.
