= Reimberg =

Coordinates: 49°48′N 5°57′E

Reimberg (German pronunciation: [ˈʁaɪmbɛʁk]; Luxembourgish: Rëmmereg) is a village in the commune of Préizerdaul, in western Luxembourg. As of September 2026, the village has a population of 237.

The terrain around Reimberg is flat to the southeast, but to the northwest it is hilly. The highest point in the vicinity is 383 meters above sea level, 1.0 kilometers north of Reimberg. The nearest major town is Ettelbruck, 12.1 kilometers northeast of Reimberg.

The area around Reimberg is mainly mixed forest. Reimberg is fairly densely populated, with 116 inhabitants per square kilometre. The area has a coastal climate. The average annual temperature in the area is 8 °C. The warmest month is July, when the average temperature is 18 °C, and the coldest is January, with -4 °C. Average annual precipitation is 1,034 millimetres. The rainiest month is October, with an average of 122 mm of precipitation, and the driest is March, with 24 mm of precipitation.
