= Pratz, Luxembourg =

Coordinates: 49°48′N 5°56′E

Pratz (German pronunciation: [ˈpʁats]; Luxembourgish: Proz) is a small town in the commune of Préizerdaul, in western Luxembourg. As of September 2026, the town has a population of 560.
