= Bettborn =

Coordinates: 49°48′N 5°56′E

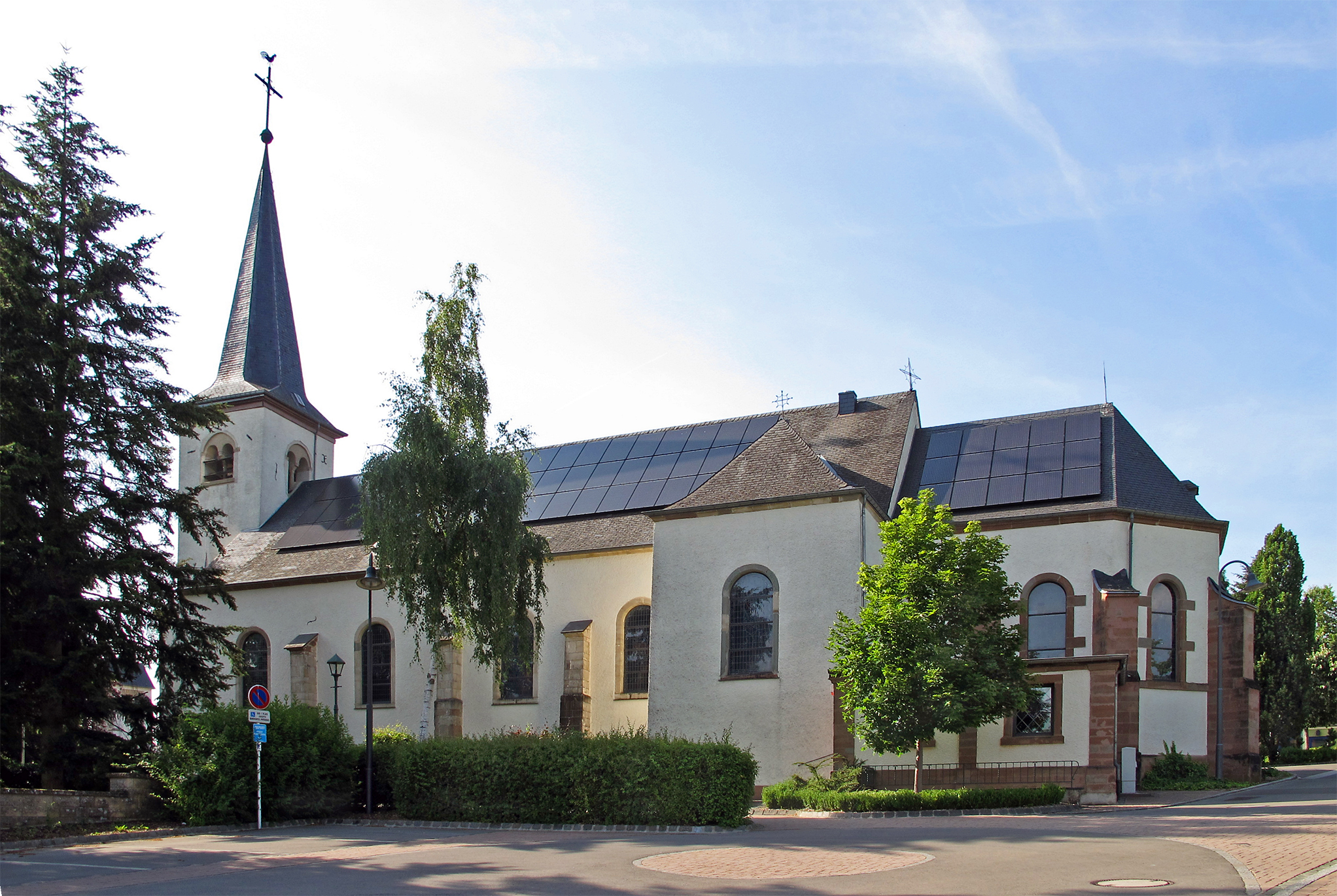
Church of Bettborn, Luxembourg

Bettborn (German pronunciation: [ˈbɛtbɔʁn]; Luxembourgish: Biebereg) is a village in the commune of Préizerdaul, in western Luxembourg. As of September 2026, the village had a population of 498. It is the administrative centre of Préizerdaul commune.

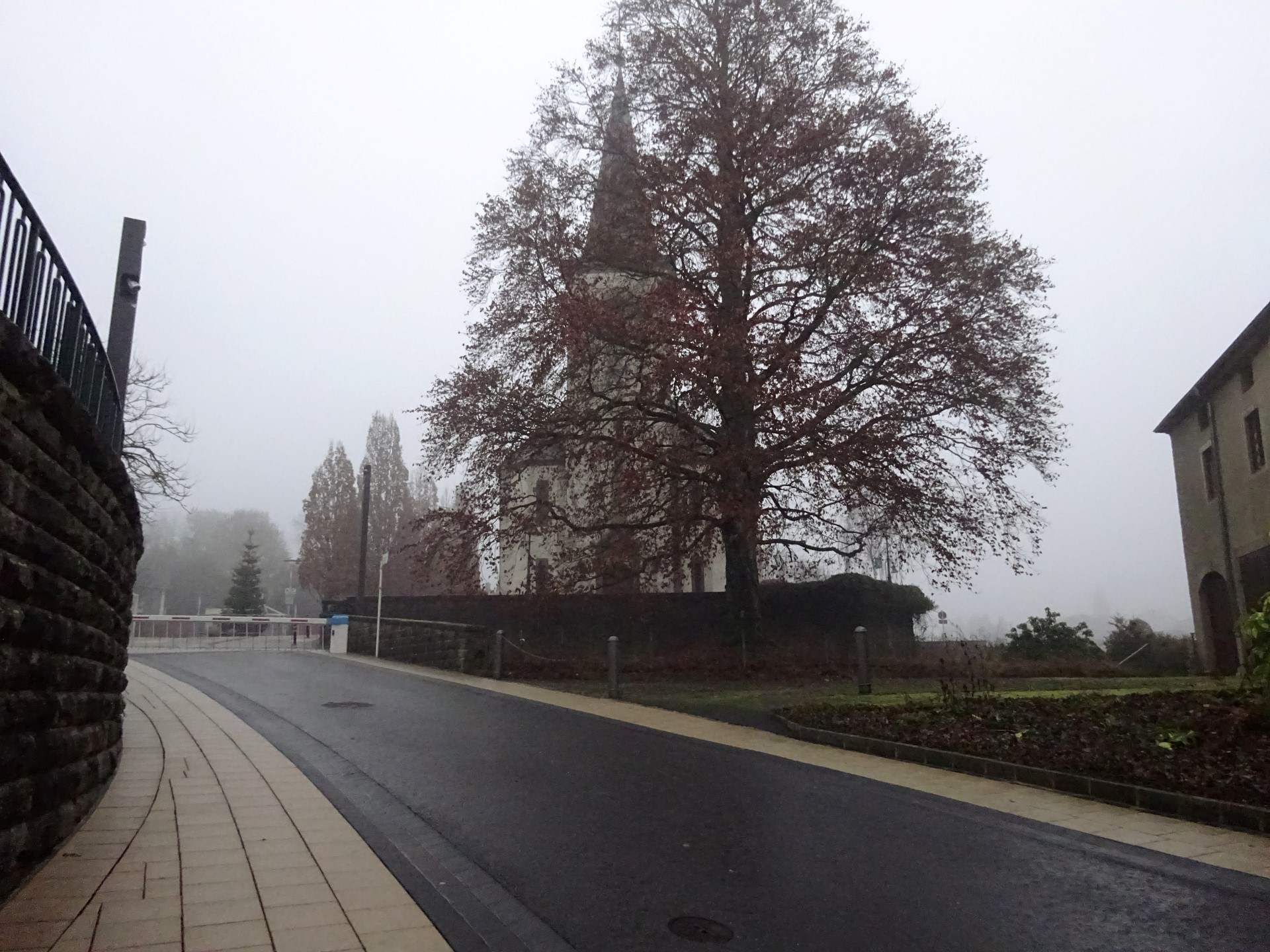

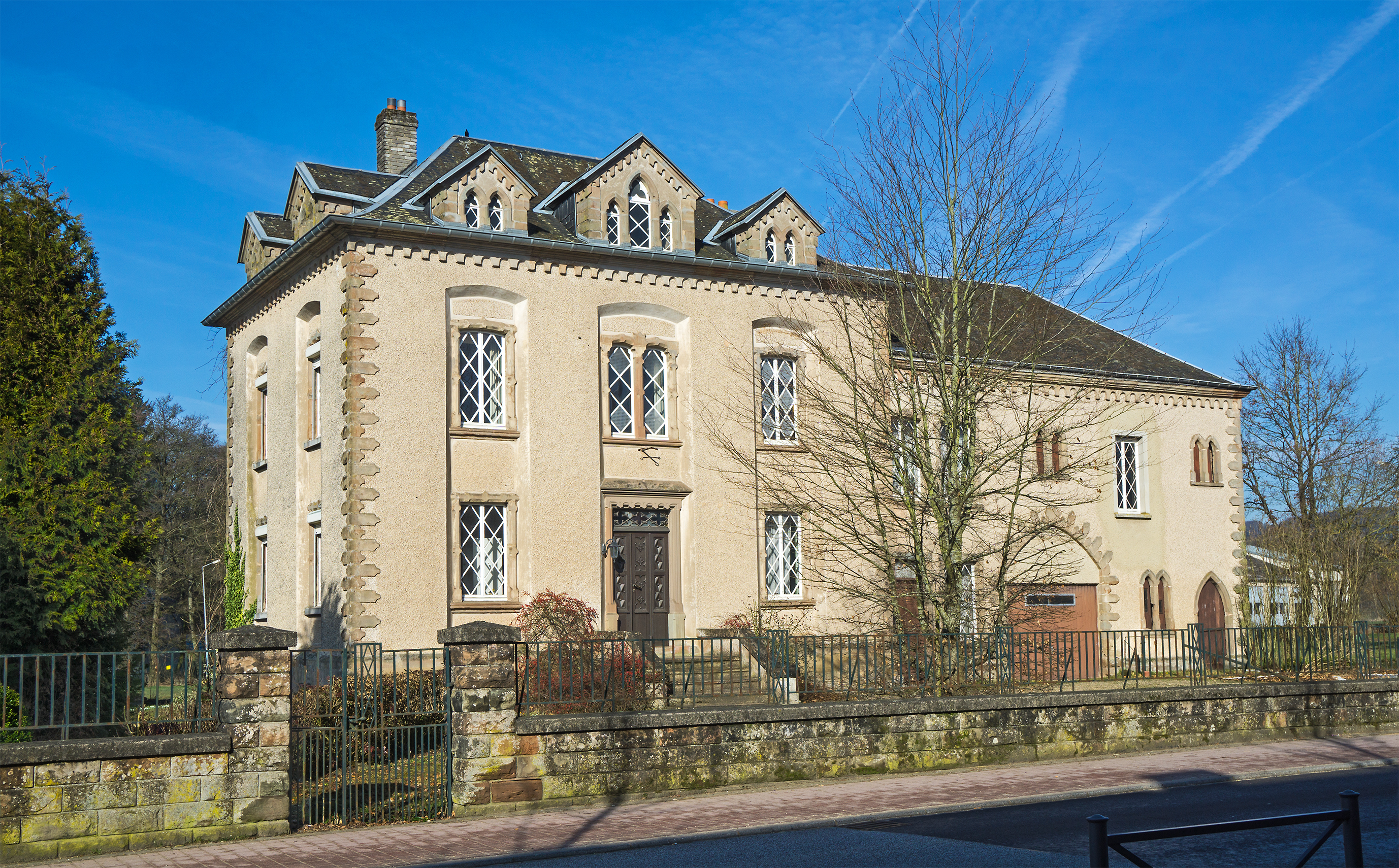

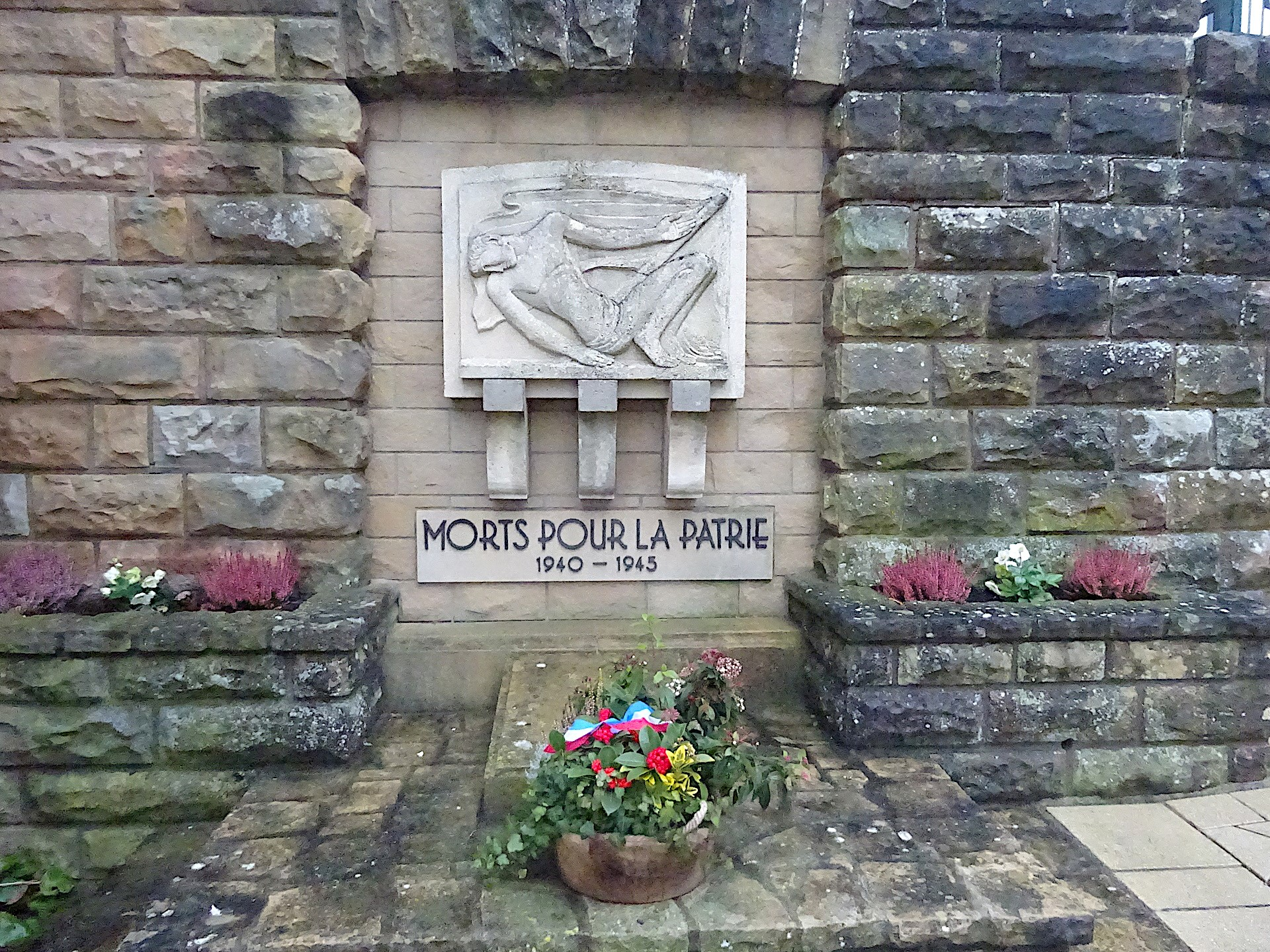

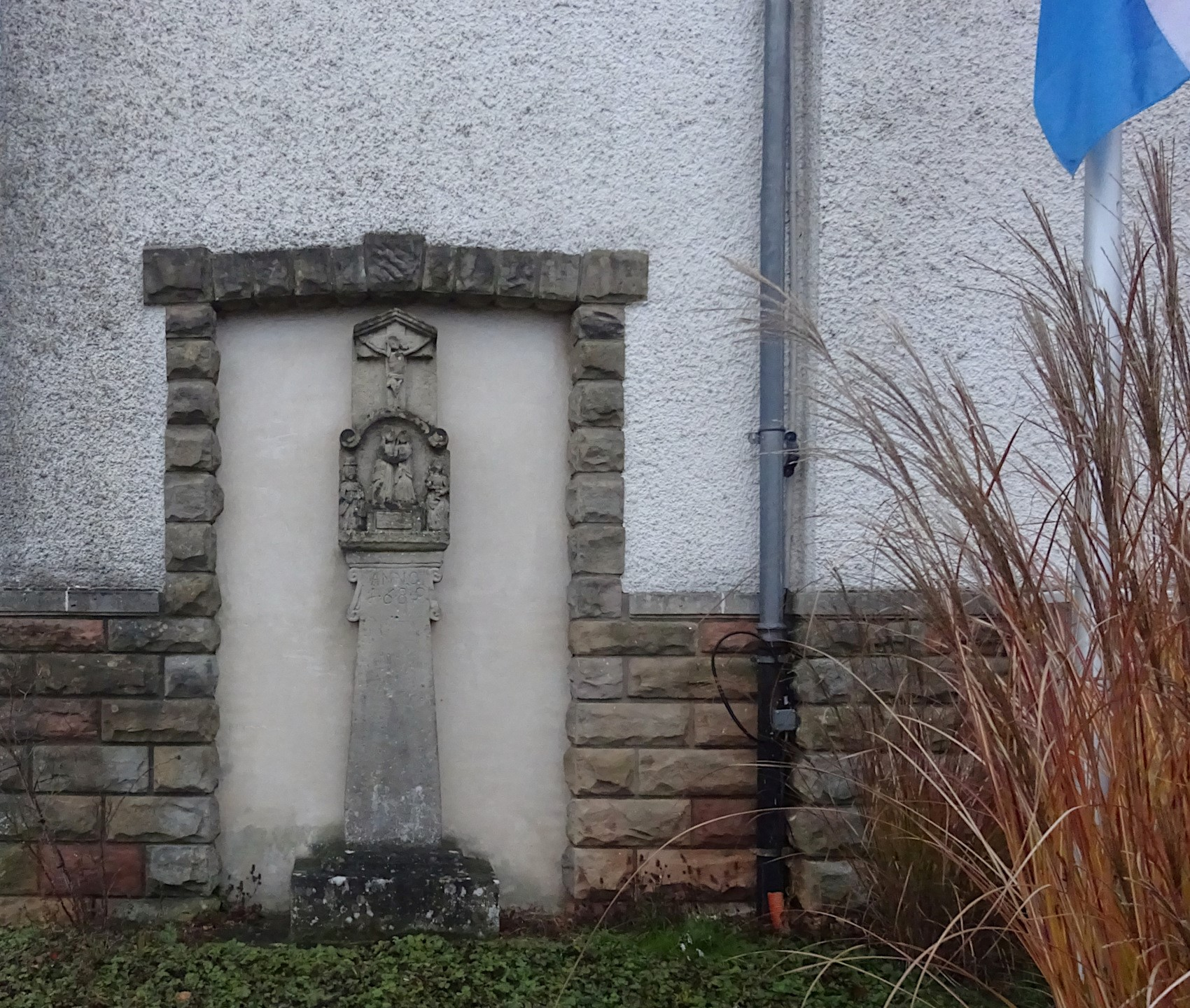
