= John Henni =

Swiss-born prelate

The Most Reverend John Martin Henni
- Archbishop of Milwaukee
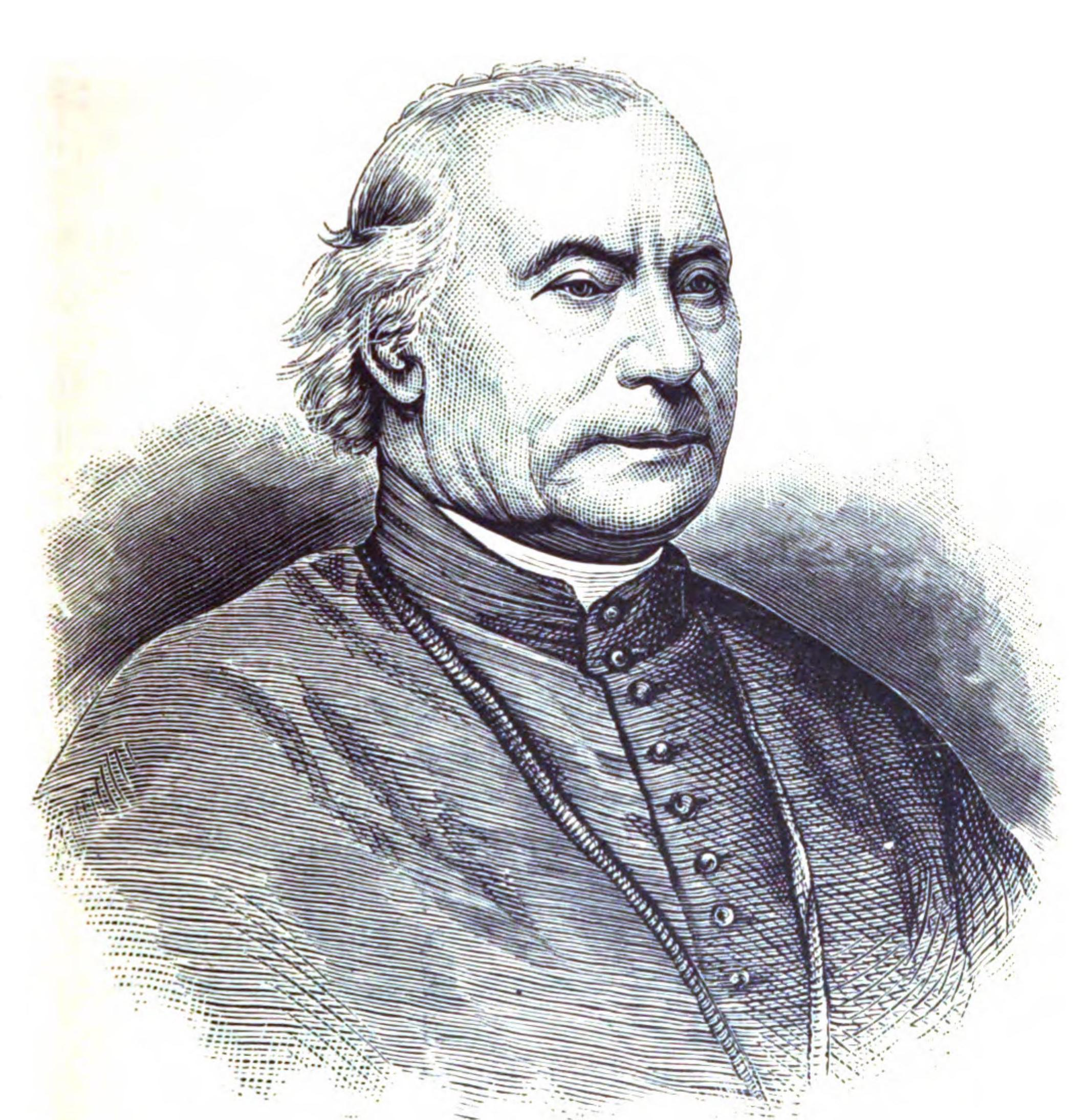
- See: Milwaukee
- Installed: November 28, 1843
- Term ended: September 7, 1881
- Predecessor: none
- Successor: Michael Heiss

Orders
- Ordination: February 2, 1829
- Consecration: March 19, 1844

Personal details
- Born: June 15, 1805 Misanenga, Obersaxen, Graubünden, Switzerland
- Died: September 7, 1881 (aged 76) Milwaukee, Wisconsin, United States
- Denomination: Roman Catholic Church

John Martin Henni (June 15, 1805 – September 7, 1881) was a Swiss-born Catholic prelate who served as the first Archbishop of Milwaukee from 1843 until his death in 1881.

== Biography ==
=== Early life and education ===
John Henni was born on June 15, 1805, in the village of Misanenga, municipality of Obersaxen, in the canton of Graubünden in Switzerland. He received his early education in St. Gallen and Lucerne, Switzerland. After Henni decided to become a priest, his bishop sent him to study philosophy and theology in Rome in 1824.

During this period, most of the bishops in the United States were forced to travel to Europe to find future priests for their parishes. While Henni was in Rome, he was recruited by Bishop Edward Fenwick to complete his seminary studies in the United States and be ordained for the Diocese of Cincinnati. Since his diocese contained many German-speaking immigrants, Fenwick needed a priest who was fluent in that language. After arriving in Baltimore, Maryland, in 1829, Henni traveled to Bardstown, Kentucky, to complete his studies at Saint Thomas Seminary.

=== Priesthood ===
Henni was ordained to the priesthood for the Diocese of Cincinnati by Fenwick on February 2, 1829. After his ordination, the diocese assigned Henni to the pastoral staff of St. Peter Parish in Cincinnati, a parish for German immigrants. He was also named to the faculty of the Athenaeum, the Jesuit college in Cincinnati, to teach philosophy to seminarians.

The diocese in 1830 transferred Henni to Canton, Ohio, to serve as pastor of St. John parish, along with several mission churches in the region. He was recalled to Cincinnati in 1834 to become pastor of Holy Trinity Church, another German parish. That same year, John Purcell, the new bishop in Cincinnati, named Henni as vicar general of the diocese.

Henni returned to Europe for a visit in 1836. While then, he published an account of missionary activity in Ohio with the hopes of motivating some seminarians to go there. After returning to Cincinnati, Henni founded the Wahrheits-Freund in 1837, the first German Catholic newspaper in the United States. He served as its editor until 1843.

Henni also organized the St. Aloysius' Orphans Aid Society in the Bond Hill section of Cincinnati. In May 1843, he accompanied Purcell to Baltimore for to the Fifth Provincial Council of Baltimore, a meeting of all the bishops in the United States. At the meeting, he proposed the establishment of a seminary to prepare priests to minister to the large German immigrant population in the United States. However, the bishops did not act on his proposal.

=== Bishop of Milwaukee ===
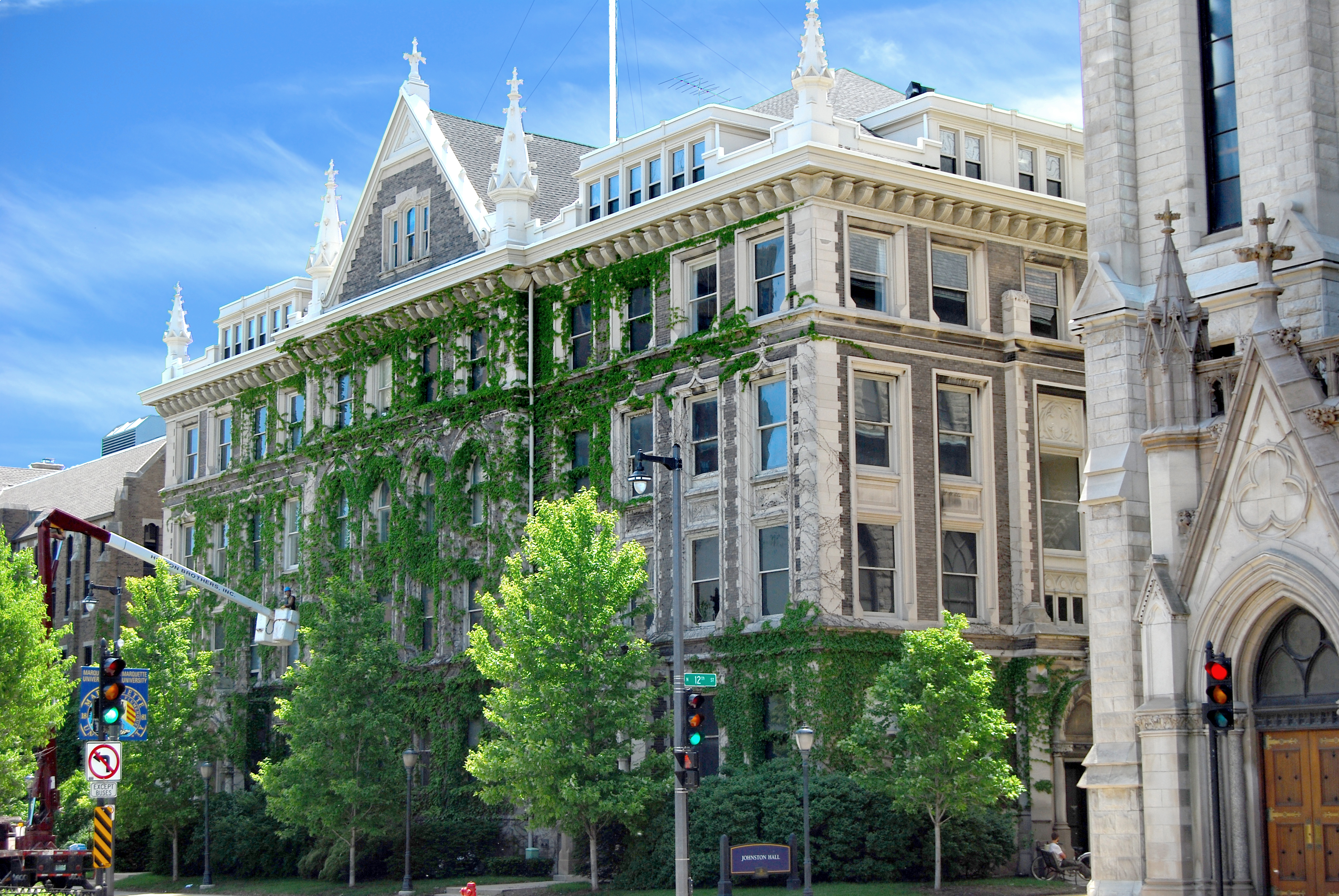
Marquette University, Marquette, Wisconsin (2008)

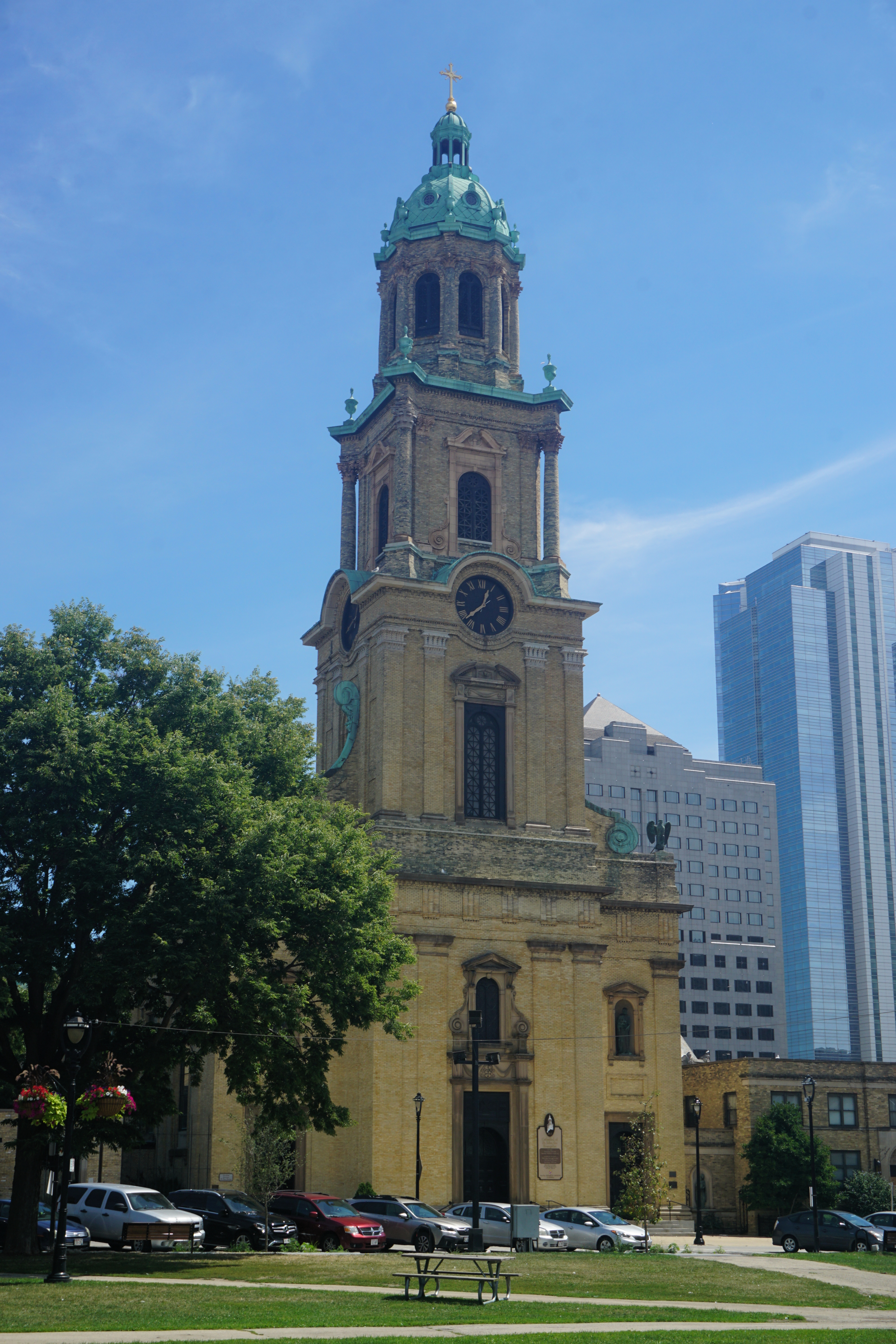
Saint John the Evangelist Cathedral, Milwaukee, Wisconsin (2022)

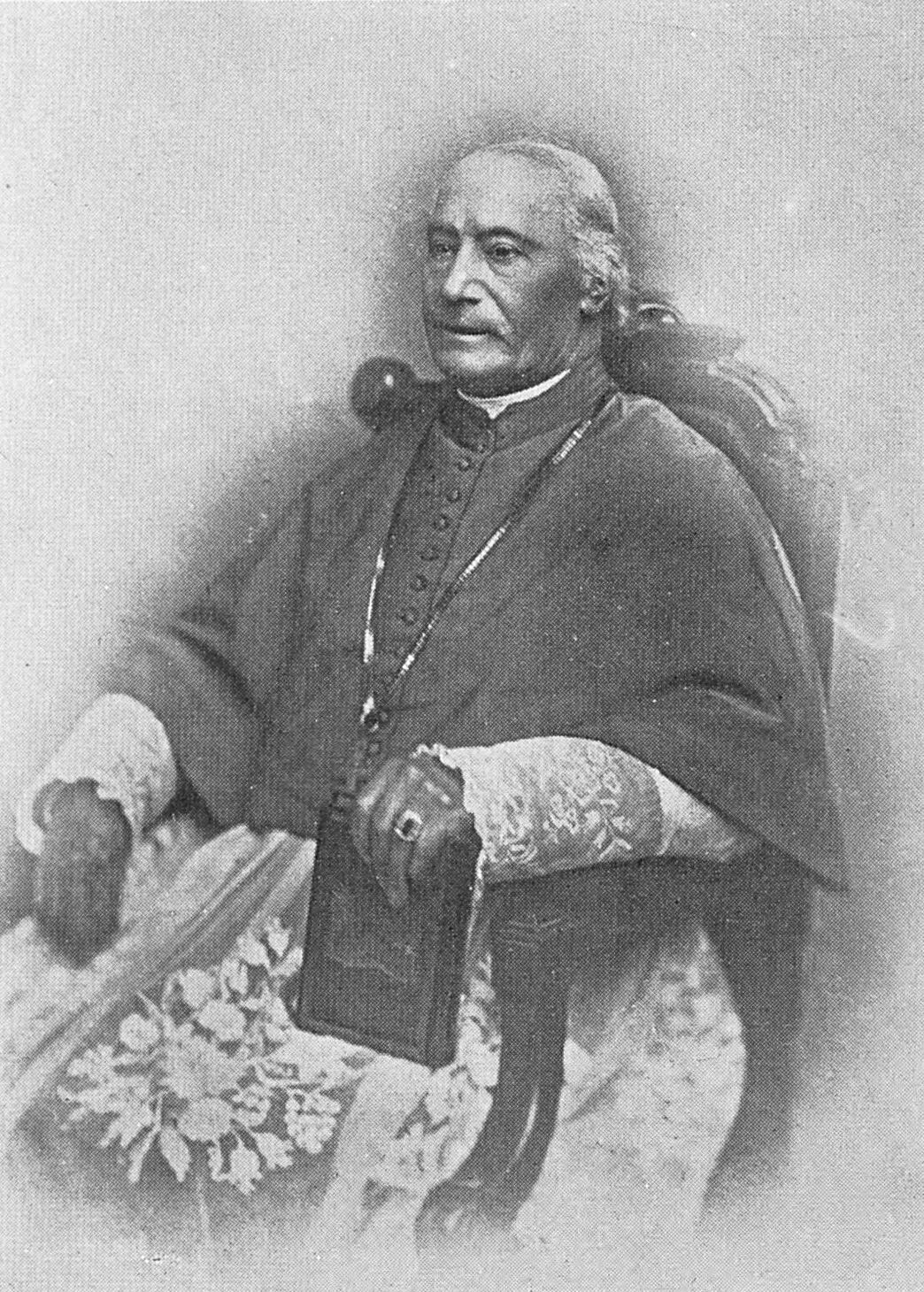
John Martin Henni, first Bishop of Milwaukee

On November 28, 1843, Henni was appointed the first bishop of the newly erected Diocese of Milwaukee by Pope Gregory XVI. This was another American diocese with a large German population. Henni received his episcopal consecration on March 19, 1844, from Purcell, with Bishops Michael O'Connor and Richard Pius Miles serving as co-consecrators. At this time, the diocese covered the entire State of Wisconsin.

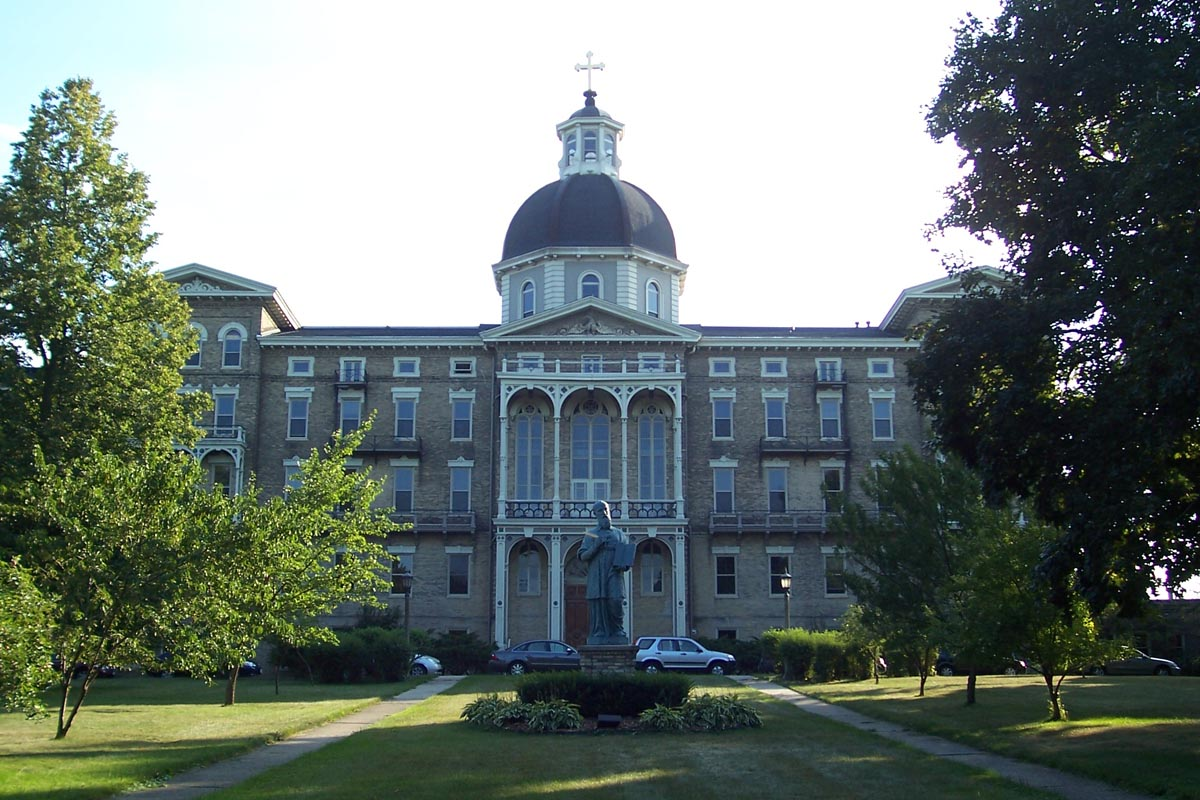
St Francis de Sales Seminary, St. Francis, Wisconsin (2006)

At the time of Henni's consecration, the City of Milwaukee had one church; the diocese contained five priests to serve 5,000 Catholics. By the end of 1844, Henni had added four more priests and was building six more churches. Needing still more priests in the diocese, Henni established St. Francis De Sales seminary in his residence in 1845.

Henni in 1847 laid the cornerstone for the Cathedral of St. John the Evangelist in Cincinnati. He also brought the Sisters of Charity religious order from Maryland into the diocese. They opened St. Mary's Hospital in Milwaukee in 1848. That same year, Henni made another trip to Europe. Once he was back in Milwaukee, he temporarily suspended construction of the cathedral.

In 1850, Henni brought a contingent of the School Sisters of Notre Dame from Bavaria to Milwaukee to open a mother house; they would begin teaching in parish schools throughout the diocese. Henni also opened an orphanage during this period.

By 1853, the diocese had a Catholic population exceeding 100,000 that was served by 73 priests. That same year, Henni finally consecrated the cathedral. When the Catholic population reached 300,000 in 1868, Henni requested that the Vatican create two new dioceses in Wisconsin. That same year, Pope Pius IX erected the Dioceses of La Crosse and Green Bay. In 1875, the Diocese of Milwaukee was elevated to the Archdiocese of Milwaukee and Henni became its first archbishop.

During the 1870s, Henni started planning for a Catholic university in the diocese. During a trip to Europe, he obtained a $16,000 gift from a Belgian businessman to purchase a property in Marquette, Wisconsin, for the school.

As Henni's health started to fail in 1880, Pope Leo XIII appointed Bishop Michael Heiss of La Crosse as coadjutor archbishop to take over most of Henni's tasks.

=== Death and legacy ===
Two days after the opening of Marquette University, Henni died on September 7, 1881, in Milwaukee. In 1956, Saint Francis de Sales Seminary renamed their main building as Henni Hall.

== See also ==
- Catholic Church hierarchy
- Catholic Church in the United States
- Historical list of the Catholic bishops of the United States
- List of Catholic bishops of the United States
- Lists of patriarchs, archbishops, and bishops

Catholic Church titles
Preceded by None	Archbishop of Milwaukee; 1843–1881	Succeeded by Michael Heiss
