= Platen, Luxembourg =

Platen
- Location within Luxembourg
- Coordinates: 49°47′N 5°56′E
- Country: Luxembourg
- Commune: Préizerdaul

Population (2025)
  - Total: 520

Platen (German pronunciation: [ˈplaːtn̩]) is a small town in the commune of Préizerdaul, in western Luxembourg. As of September 2026, the town has a population of 514.
