= Michael Heiss =

Roman Catholic Church cleric

His Excellency, The Most Reverend Michael Heiss
- Archbishop of Milwaukee
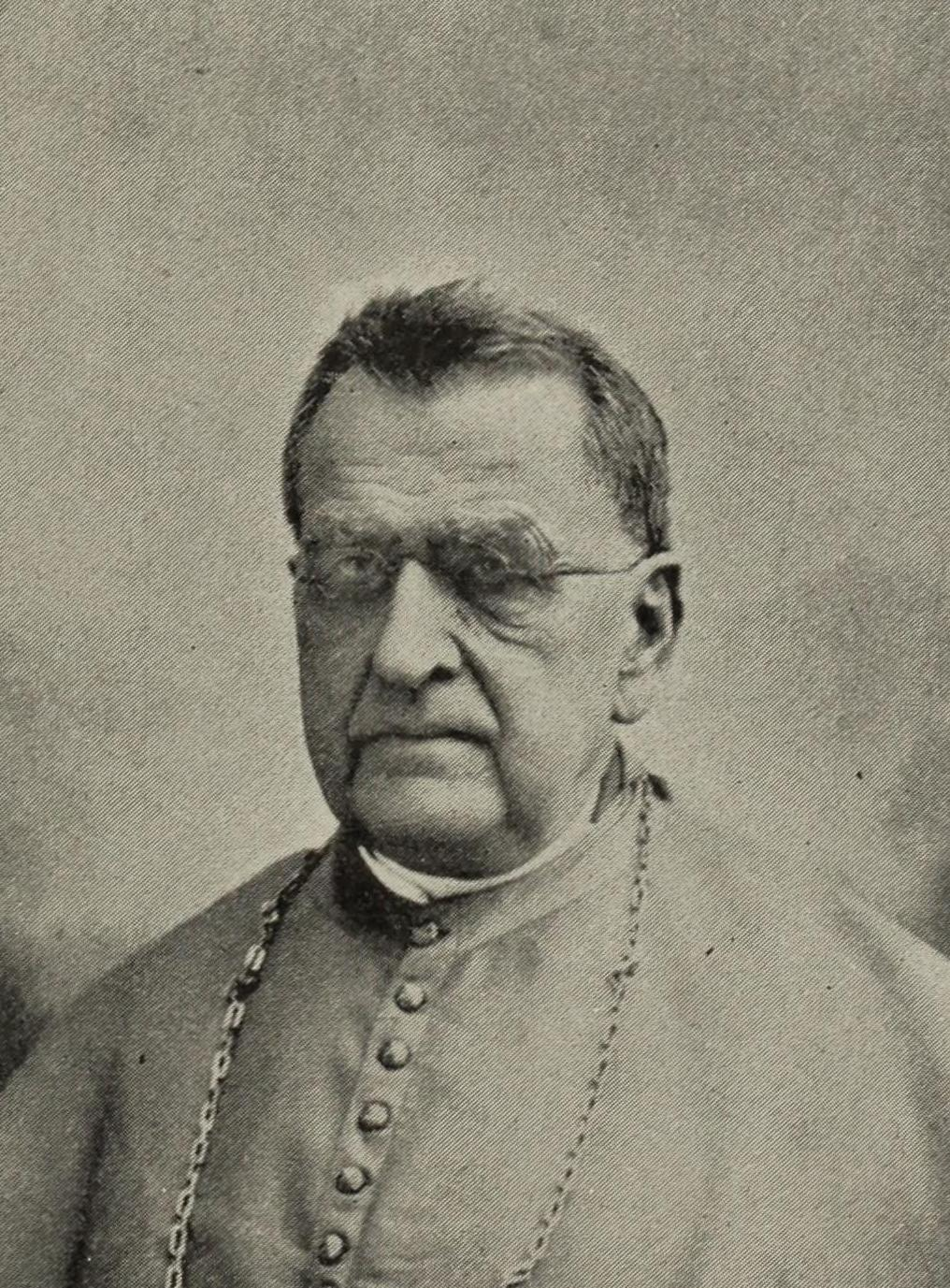
- See: Archdiocese of Milwaukee
- Installed: September 7, 1881
- Term ended: March 26, 1890
- Predecessor: John Henni
- Successor: Frederick Katzer
- Other posts: Bishop of La Crosse (1868–1880); Coadjutor Archbishop of Milwaukee (1880–1881)

Orders
- Ordination: October 18, 1840 by Karl-August von Reisach
- Consecration: September 6, 1868 by John Henni

Personal details
- Born: April 12, 1818 Pfahldorf, Kingdom of Bavaria
- Died: March 26, 1890 (aged 71) La Crosse, Wisconsin, US
- Denomination: Catholic Church
- Education: Ludwig-Maximilians-Universität München
- Motto: Gratia et pax (Grace and peace)

Michael Heiss (12 April 1818 – 26 March 1890) was a German-born American Catholic prelate who served as archbishop of Milwaukee in Wisconsin from 1881 to 1890. He previously served as the first Bishop of La Crosse in Wisconsin (1868–1880).

== Biography ==
=== Early years ===
Michael Heiss was born on April 12, 1818, in Pfahldorf in the Kingdom of Bavaria (now part of present-day Kipfenberg, Germany), to Joseph and Gertrude (née Frei) Heiss. He received confirmation when he was only two years old because his parents feared they would be without a bishop for a prolonged period of time due to tension between church and state. Heiss entered a Latin school at age nine, and later graduated from the gymnasium of Neuburg, Bavaria, in 1835.

Heiss then entered the Ludwig-Maximilians-Universität München, where he originally studied law but switched to theology after deciding to join the priesthood. He completed his studies at the Collegium Willibaldum, a seminary in Eichstätt, Bavaria.

=== Ordination and ministry ===
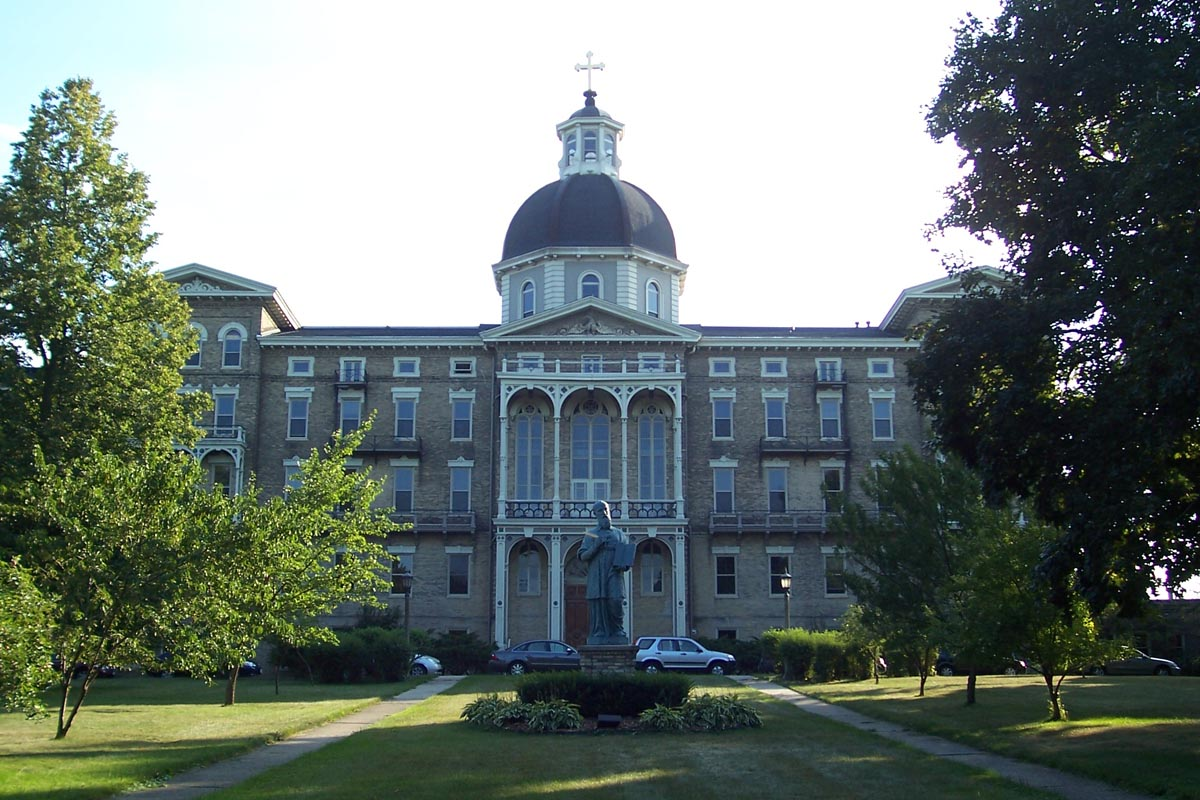
St. Francis de Sales Seminary, St. Francis, Wisconsin (2006)

Heiss was ordained a priest in Bavaria for the Diocese of Louisville by Bishop Karl-August von Reisach on October 18, 1840. Because, at age 22, he was younger than the age requirement for ordination, Heiss was granted a dispensation by Pope Gregory XVI. Heiss briefly served as a curate in Raitenbuch, Bavaria and afterwards in Pleinfeld, Bavaria.

In December 1842, Heiss immigrated to the United States, where the diocese assigned him as pastor of Mother of God Parish, a German immigrant parish in Covington, Kentucky.

The Diocese of Louisville released Heiss in 1844 to serve as secretary to John Henni, bishop of the new Diocese of Milwaukee in Wisconsin. Heiss in 1849 attended the first Plenary Council of Baltimore, a meeting of all the bishops in the United States. At this time, the German Catholics in Milwaukee were pressing Henni for a German-language national parish. In response, Henni erected St. Mary's Parish in Milwaukee and assigned Heiss as its first pastor.

While at St. Mary's, Heiss' health deteriorated, forcing him to spend the next two years in Europe recuperating. In 1856, after Heiss returned to Wisconsin, Henni appointed him as rector of St. Francis de Sales Seminary in St. Francis, Wisconsin. Heiss opened Christ King Chapel at the seminary in 1861. He served as rector at St. Francis until 1868.

=== Bishop of La Crosse ===
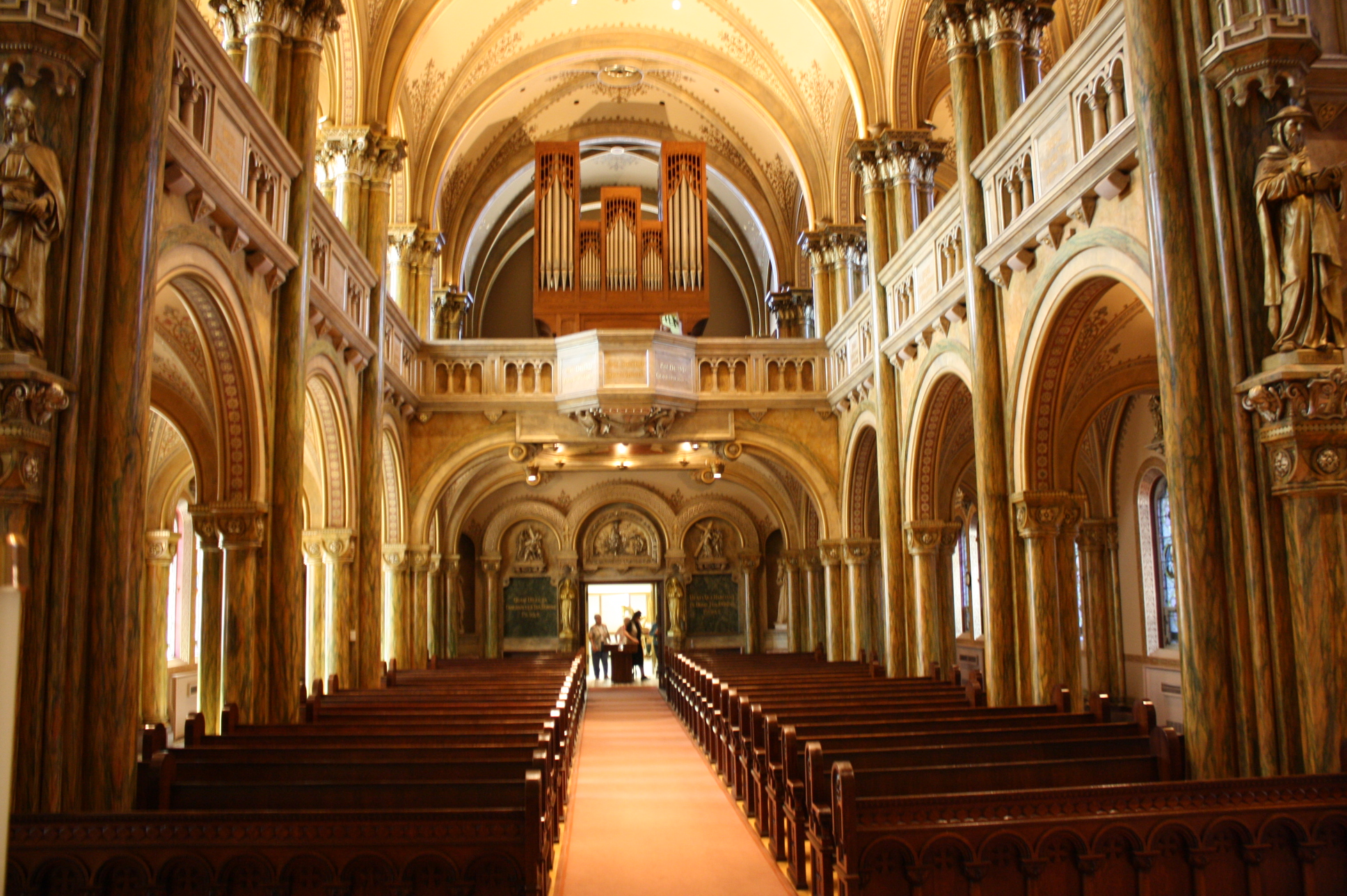
Mary of the Angels Chapel, St. Rose of Viterbo Convent, La Crosse, Wisconsin (2009)

Pope Pius IX on March 3, 1868, erected the Diocese of La Crosse in Wisconsin and appointed Heiss as its first bishop. He was consecrated at the Cathedral of St John the Evangelist in Milwaukee on September 6, 1868, by Henni.

When the diocese was erected, it had 22 priests, 23 churches and approximated 50 stations. The diocese included national parishes for Irish, German, Polish and Italian immigrants. The diocese at this time was financially-strapped and reliant on foreign donations for its operations.

After his consecration, Heiss hired architect Charles I. Ross to design St. Joseph Cathedral. Heiss laid the cornerstone for the Cathedral in 1869. That same year, he returned to Baltimore for the Second Plenary Council.

In 1870, Heiss traveled to Rome to attend the First Vatican Council. The new cathedral was dedicated that year during his absence. After the conclusion of the conference, Heiss traveled to Bavaria to visit friends and family and to recruit more clergy for his diocese.

In 1871, at Heiss' request, the Franciscan Sisters of Perpetual Adoration transferred from Jefferson, Wisconsin to Milwaukee, where they built the St. Rose of Viterbo Convent. The sisters had previously worked with Heiss, managing the household responsibilities at Saint Francis de Sales Seminary. That same year, they opened St. Rose High School in La Crosse.

=== Coadjutor Archbishop and Archbishop of Milwaukee ===
On March 14, 1880, Heiss was appointed coadjutor archbishop of Milwaukee by Pope Leo XIII to assist Henni. On September 7, 1881, after Henni's death, Heiss automatically succeeded him as archbishop of Milwaukee.

As archbishop, Heiss reduced the archdiocesan debt and created a school board for the growing number of archdiocesan schools. He promoted the teaching of English in the parish schools and worked to recruit more American women into the religious orders. In 1884, Heiss attended the Third Plenary Council of Baltimore.

=== Death and legacy ===
Michael Heiss died in La Crosse, Wisconsin, on March 26, 1890, at age 71. He was buried at Christ King Chapel in St. Francis de Sales Seminary.

=== Publications ===
- The Four Gospels Examined and Vindicated on Catholic Principles, Milwaukee, Hoffman Brothers, 1863
- "De Matrimonio", an essay in Latin

== See also ==
- Catholic Church in the United States
- Historical list of the Catholic bishops of the United States
- List of Catholic bishops of the United States
- Lists of patriarchs, archbishops, and bishops

Catholic Church titles
Preceded by John Henni	Archbishop of Milwaukee; 1881–1890	Succeeded by Frederick Katzer
Preceded by None	Coadjutor Bishop of Milwaukee; 1880–1881	Succeeded by None
Preceded by None	Bishop of La Crosse; 1868–1880	Succeeded by Kilan Caspar Flasch
