= Franciscan Sisters of Perpetual Adoration =

Roman Catholic religious congregation headquartered in La Crosse, Wisconsin

- Abbreviation: FPSA
- Formation: 1849; 177 years ago
- Type: Religious institute
- Headquarters: La Crosse, Wisconsin, U.S.
- Coordinates: 43.804518°N 91.2483999°W
- President: Sister Linda Mershon
- Website: www.fspa.org

The Franciscan Sisters of Perpetual Adoration (FSPA) is a Catholic religious congregation for women whose motherhouse, St. Rose of Viterbo Convent, is in La Crosse, Wisconsin. The congregation founded Viterbo University and staffed Aquinas High School in La Crosse. The congregation traces its roots to 1849 in Bavaria.

== History ==
In 1849, a group of Third Order Secular Franciscans traveled from Ettenbeuren, Bavaria, to Milwaukee to assist Bishop John Henni in the newly organized Diocese of Milwaukee. The group consisted of both men and women and was led by Father Francis Anthony Keppeler and his assistant, Father Mathias Steiger. They arrived on May 18, 1849, and were formally received into the diocese on May 28, a day which is celebrated annually by the sisters as Founders Day. The six women of the group, led by Mother Aemiliana Dirr, began their mission to care for the region's German immigrants, both physically and spiritually. In 1850, these women officially became part of the Third Order Regular Franciscans as religious sisters. They took their vows in 1853.

The sisters were initially tasked with caring for land and performing housework within the religious community. In 1855, they assumed care and education of orphaned boys at the diocese's St. Aemilian's Orphanage for Boys. In 1856, the sisters were reassigned to the newly established Saint Francis de Sales Seminary to perform household duties. Frustrated by the menial and spiritually lacking work they had been assigned at the seminary, many sisters left the diocese in 1860. A new motherhouse was established at St. Coletta Convent in Jefferson, Wisconsin, in 1864. At the request of the Bishop of La Crosse, Michael Heiss, the motherhouse was again relocated in 1871, establishing the St. Rose of Viterbo Convent. In 1873, Mother Antonia asked the remaining sisters in Milwaukee to relocate to La Crosse, although 37 choose to continue their work in seminary ministry and split off to form the Sisters of St. Francis of Assisi. Mother Antonia's community in La Crosse thus became known as the Franciscan Sisters of Perpetual Adoration.

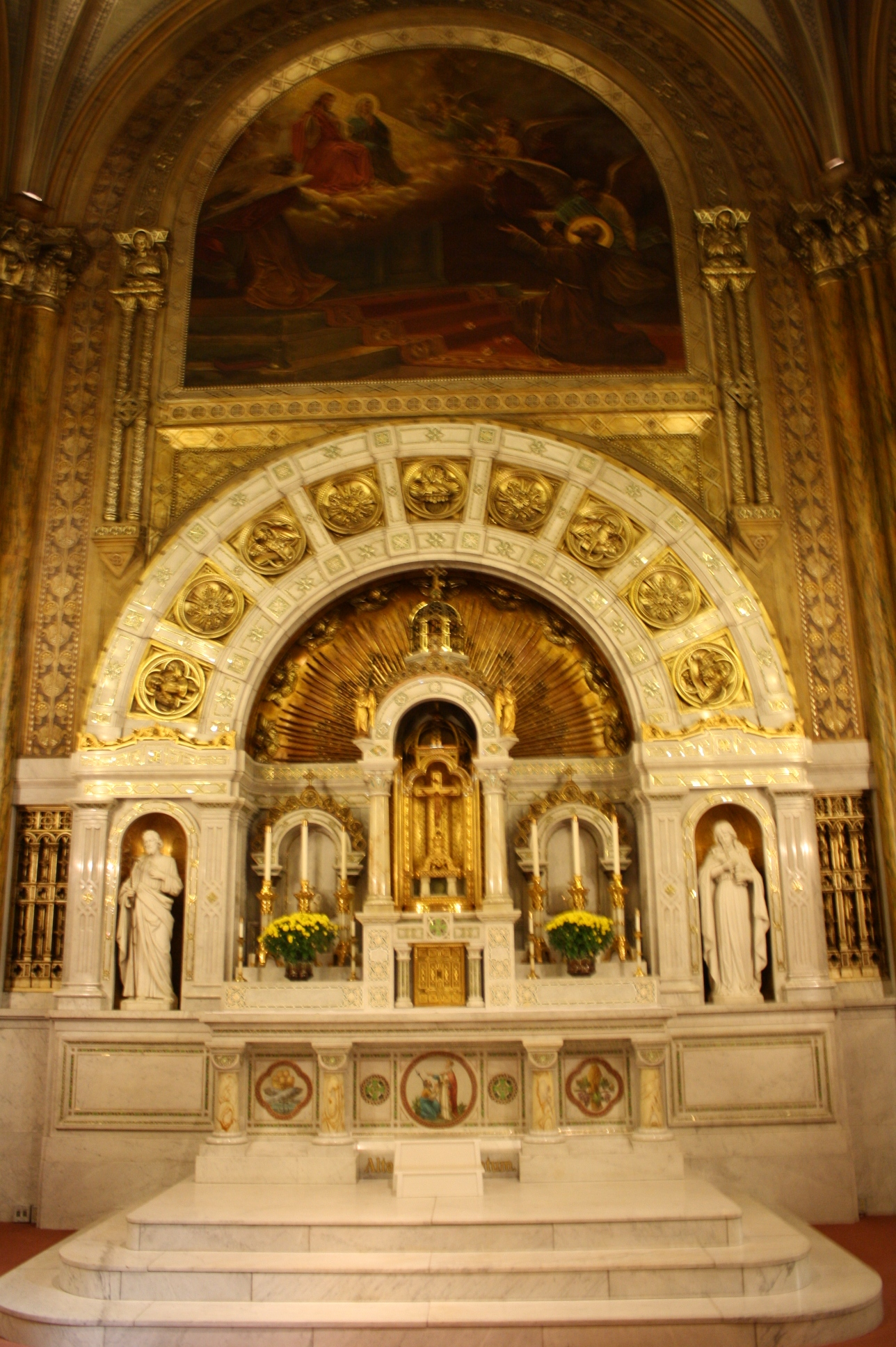
Maria Angelorum Chapel

The congregation is named for its practice of perpetual prayer. The community initiated the practice of Perpetual Adoration in 1878. At least two Sisters would pray at all times in the congregation's adoration chapel, with sisters rotating through one-hour shifts. Due to declining numbers of sisters, volunteers were asked to participate in these shifts beginning in 1997. This practice continued until 2020, when overnight prayer ceased, and the ritual was consolidated to a 6 a.m. to 10 p.m. schedule. Of the change, Sister McKenzie stated that, "the sisters and prayer partners will continue adoration in the Adoration Chapel to the extent possible, and by definition of perpetual repeated continuously even though interrupted for portions of time." The practice officially ended on Ash Wednesday, February 26, 2020, at which point perpetual prayer had been maintained without interruption for 141 years. Prayer requests continue to be complied each week, which the sisters then assemble into a pamphlet of names and intentions for prayer.

As a result of a period of renewal leading to a divergence of vision within the Franciscan Sisters of Perpetual Adoration, fifty-five sisters left to form a separate congregation, the Franciscan Sisters of the Eucharist, on December 2, 1973.

== Present day ==
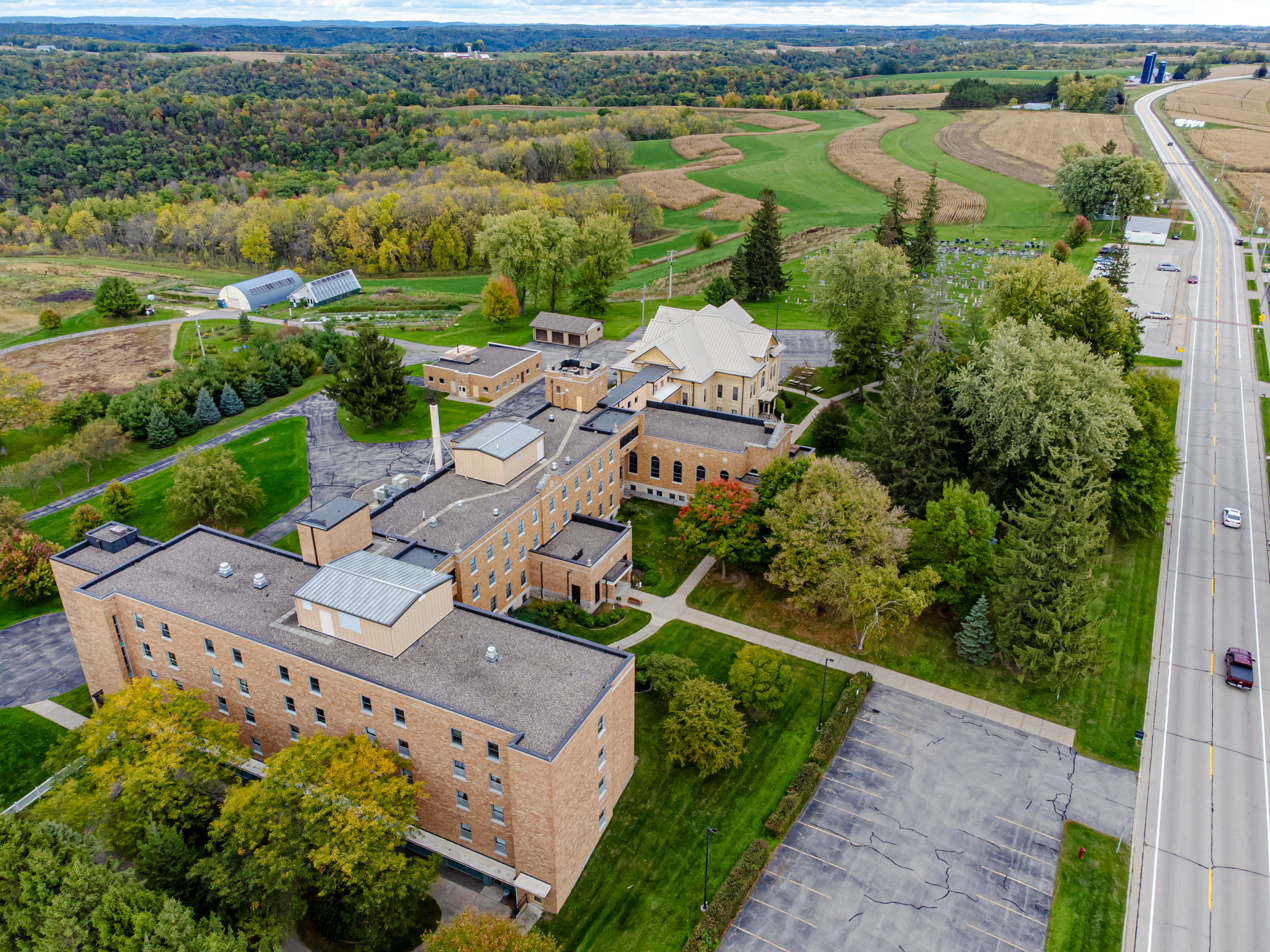
The Villa in St. Joseph on WIS 33

In 1890 the sisters began St. Rose Normal School to prepare sisters to teach in elementary schools. It is now known as Viterbo University, a Catholic, Franciscan, liberal arts university.

In 1955 the FSPA arrived on Guam, where they serve in the Archdiocese of Agana. Their encompass work at the Catholic Medical Center (FHP) as staff and coordinators; Guam Memorial Hospital as administrator, directors, and volunteers; Catholic Schools as superintendent, administrators, and teachers; and Parish Ministers.

The Sisters are a sponsoring member of 8th Day Center for Justice.

The Franciscan Sisters of Perpetual Adoration have their retirement home in St. Joseph's Ridge, Wisconsin.

=== Common Venture program ===
Under the "Common Venture", is a cooperative effort on the part of the Franciscan Sisters of Perpetual Adoration, the Sisters of St. Francis of Assisi in Milwaukee, and the Franciscan Sisters of the Eucharist in Meriden, Connecticut. "Common Venture" grew out of a 1999 150th anniversary celebration of the common founding of the three American Franciscan communities. Together they have contributed more than $1.5 million in goods and services to the Tertiary Sisters of St. Francis in Cameroon. Sr. Marla Lang FSPA compared the role of the sisters in Cameroon to that of sisters in the United States in the late 19th century. “The systems of health care and education are being built up through religious orders. The sisters are pioneers for the people in their country."

== Notable people ==
- Servant of God Thea Bowman, educator, liturgist, and venerated figure

== See also ==
- St. Rose of Viterbo Convent
- Sisters of St. Francis of Assisi
- Franciscan Sisters of the Eucharist
