= Diocese of La Crosse =

Latin Catholic jurisdiction in the US

Coordinates: 43°46′14″N 91°13′16″W

Diocese of La Crosse Dioecesis Crossensis
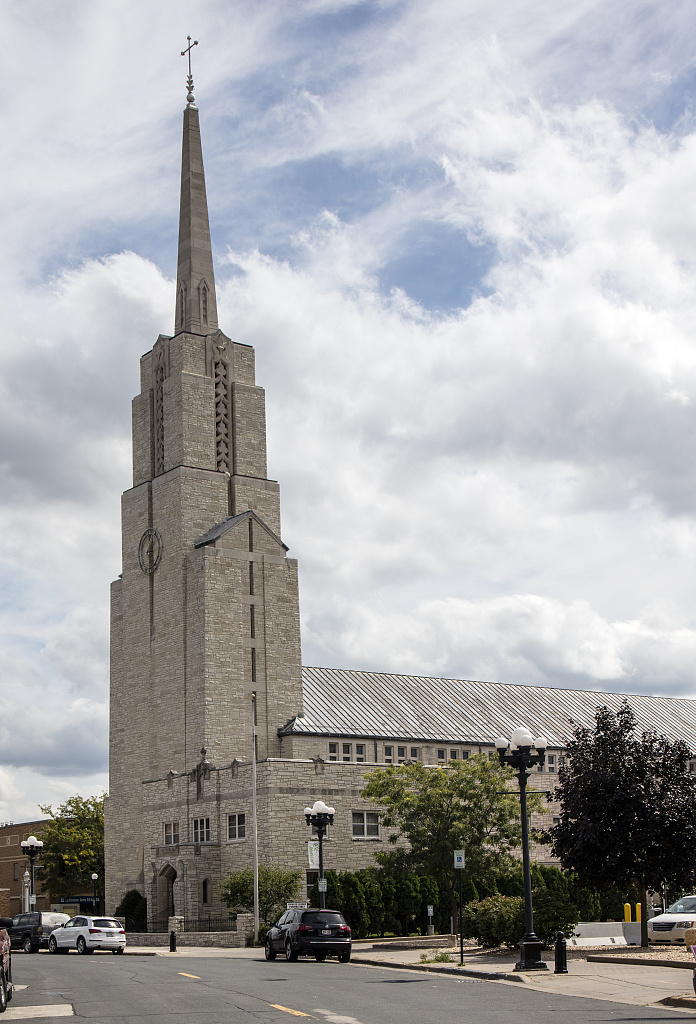
- Cathedral of Saint Joseph the Workman

- Coat of arms

Location
- Country: United States
- Territory: Western Wisconsin (19 counties)
- Ecclesiastical province: Milwaukee

Statistics
- Area: 15,078 sq mi (39,050 km^{2})
- Population: Total; Catholics: (as of 2004); 863,610; 206,191 (23.5%)
- Parishes: 160

Information
- Denomination: Catholic Church
- Sui iuris church: Latin Church
- Rite: Roman Rite
- Established: March 3, 1868 (158 years ago)
- Cathedral: Cathedral of Saint Joseph the Workman
- Patron saint: St. Joseph the Workman (primary) St. Francis of Assisi (secondary)

Current leadership
- Pope: Leo XIV
- Bishop: Gerard William Battersby
- Metropolitan Archbishop: Jeffrey S. Grob
- Bishops emeritus: William P. Callahan

Map
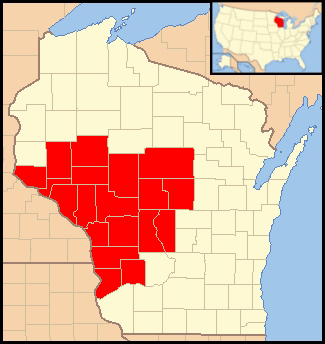

Website
- diolc.org

The Diocese of La Crosse (Latin: Dioecesis Crossensis) is a diocese of the Catholic Church in west-central Wisconsin in the United States. It is a suffragan diocese of the Archdiocese of Milwaukee. The mother church is the Cathedral of Saint Joseph the Workman in La Crosse.

== Territory ==
The Diocese of La Crosse encompasses the city of La Crosse and 19 Wisconsin counties: Adams, Buffalo, Chippewa, Clark, Crawford, Dunn, Eau Claire, Jackson, Juneau, La Crosse, Marathon, Monroe, Pepin, Pierce, Portage, Richland, Trempealeau, Vernon, and Wood.

== History ==
=== 1630 to 1800 ===
The first Catholic presence in present-day Wisconsin was that of French Catholic missionaries in the Green Bay area in the 17th century. When French explorer Jean Nicolet entered the Green Bay areas in 1634, he was followed by Jesuit missionaries. Wisconsin became part of the French colony of New France.

The first catholic missionary in the Superior region was René Menard, a French Jesuit missionary who was fluent in the Ojibwe, Odawa, and Huron dialects. In Spring 1661, he explored to Chequamegon Bay on Lake Superior. In 1665, Claude Allouez started a Catholic mission near Chequamegon Bay, naming it the Mission of the Holy Ghost. In 1669, Jacques Marquette arrived at the mission after Allouez moved to the Fox River Valley. Marquette baptized over 1,000 converts. In 1669, Allouez and Marquette established St. Joseph in La Pointe, but it was later abandoned.

Allouez celebrated Mass with a Native American tribe near present-day Oconto, Wisconsin in December 1669, the feast of St. Francis Xavier. He established the Saint Francis Xavier Mission there. The mission moved to Red Banks for a short time in 1671, and then to De Pere, where it remained until 1687, when it was burned. The missionaries worked with the Fox, Sauk, and Winnebago tribes, protected by Fort Francis near Green Bay. When Fort Francis was destroyed in 1728, the missionaries left the area.

When the British took control of New France in 1763 after the French and Indian Wars, the bishops in Quebec continued to have jurisdiction in the region. In 1791, soon after the conclusion of the American Revolution, Pope Pius VI erected the Diocese of Baltimore. It covered all the American states and the Northwest Territory, which included part of present-day Wisconsin. The rest of Wisconsin became part of the territory after the Louisiana Purchase in 1803.

=== 1800 to 1868 ===
Catholic jurisdiction for the new Wisconsin Territory passed to the Diocese of Bardstown in 1808, then the Diocese of Cincinnati in 1826. The first new Catholic church in the Wisconsin area in over 100 years was constructed in Fort Howard in 1825. Its parishioners included many French Canadians living in the settlement.

In 1833, the new Diocese of Detroit assumed jurisdiction over the area. In 1837, the missionary Florimund J. Bonduel traveled from Green Bay to visit the French fur trader Solomon Juneau in Milwaukee. While in Milwaukee, Bonduel celebrated the first mass in that city.

In November 1843, Pope Gregory XVI erected the Diocese of Milwaukee, taking its territory from the Diocese of Detroit. The new diocese covered all of the Wisconsin Territory, including part of present-day Minnesota.

In Stevens Point, the first Catholic parish was St. Stephen, established in 1853. The first Catholic church in La Crosse was the Church of the Immaculate Conception of the Blessed Virgin Mary, constructed in 1856. In 1858, St. Mary's Academy for girls was found in that city. St. Patrick Parish, the first in Eau Claire was established in 1865.

=== 1868 to 1892 ===
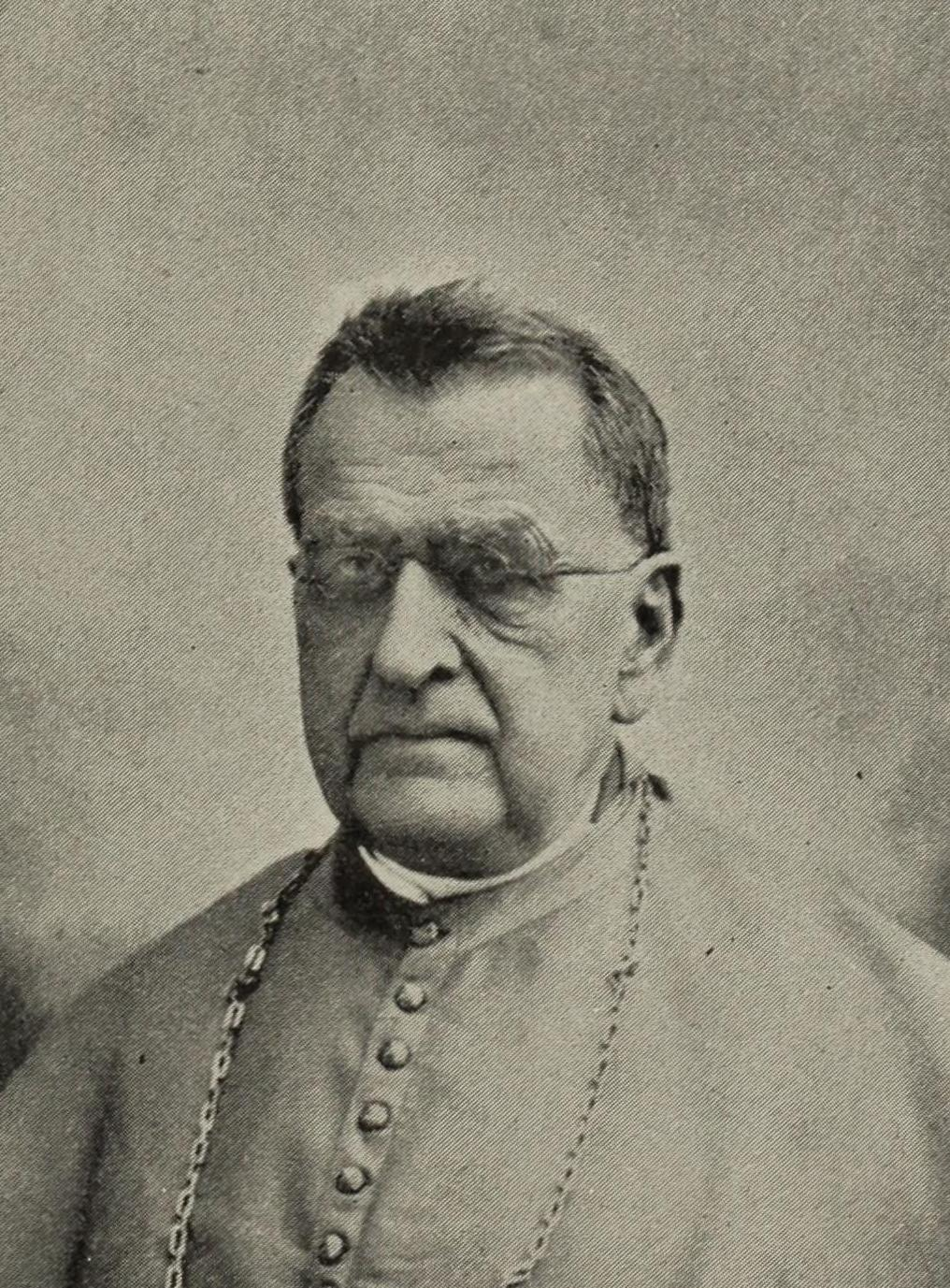
Bishop Heiss (1889)

Pope Pius IX erected the Diocese of La Crosse on March 3, 1868, with territory from the Diocese of Milwaukee. The new diocese covered all of Wisconsin north and west of the Wisconsin River. The pope named Michael Heiss of the Diocese of Louisville as the first bishop of La Crosse.

When the diocese was erected, it had 22 priests, 23 churches and about 50 stations. Along with the English and German congregations, provisions were also made for Poles and Italians. As bishop, Heiss built several churches, including the cathedral, and the episcopal residence. The first Catholic church in Wausau, St. Mary, opened in 1871.

Also in 1871, Heisse invited the Franciscan Sisters of Perpetual Adoration to move their order from Jefferson, Wisconsin, to La Crosse, where they build the St. Rose of Viterbo Convent. The Franciscan Sisters then opened several schools in the diocese and St. Michael's Orphanage in La Crosse in 1875.

In 1880, Pope Leo XIII named Heiss coadjutor archbishop of the Archdiocese of Milwaukee. Heiss was succeeded by Kilian Flasch of the Archdiocese of Milwaukee, appointed by Leo XIII in 1881. An outspoken supporter of Catholic education, he established 36 new schools during his tenure and, at the Plenary Council, unsuccessfully sought to require Catholic parents to send their children to parochial schools. In 1890, the Franciscan Sisters founded the St. Rose Normal School in La Crosse to prepare nuns to serve as teachers. Flasch died in 1891.

=== 1892 to 1948 ===
To replace Flasch, Leo XIII appointed Monsignor James Schwebach, the vicar general of the diocese, in 1892 as the third bishop of La Crosse. In 1905, Pope Pius X erected the Diocese of Superior, with part of its territory taken from the Diocese of La Crosse.

Pope Pius XI appointed Auxiliary Bishop Alexander McGavick of the Archdiocese of Chicago to succeed Schwebach as bishop of La Crosse in 1921. During McGavick's tenure as bishop, the Catholic population grew from 116,000 to 140,000. When he first arrived, there were 156 parishes, 78 mission churches, 90 parochial schools, and 189 secular priests with 51 religious. By his first 20 years, he had established more than 20 parishes and 41 schools. He founded Aquinas High School in La Crosse in 1928. St. Rose Normal School in 1939 was transformed into Viterbo University.

In 1945, Pope Pius XII named Monsignor John Treacy from the Diocese of Cleveland as coadjutor bishop to assist McGavick. In 1946, Pius XII removed territory from the Diocese of La Crosse to form part of the new Diocese of Madison.

=== 1948 to 1994 ===
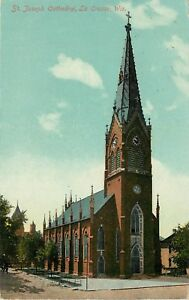
St. Joseph Cathedral, La Crosse, Wisconsin (1911)

When McGavick died in 1948, Treacy automatically succeeded him as bishop of La Crosse. During his 16-year tenure, Treacy founded Holy Cross Seminary, oversaw the construction of the Cathedral of Saint Joseph the Workman in La Crosse, and established 47 churches, 43 convents, and 42 schools. McGavick ordered the closing of the Necedah Shrine of Mary Van Hoof in Necedah, in 1950. Van Hoof had claimed to experience religious visions, but the Vatican had determined that her claims were false. Treacy died in 1964.

The next bishop of La Crosse was Bishop Frederick Freking from the Diocese of Salina, named by Pope Paul VI in 1965. During his tenure in La Crosse, Freking reduced the diocesan debt from $11 million to $4 million between 1965 and 1981. He established a diocesan commission on Christian renewal in 1965, and the first lay ministry training program in the United States in 1975.

Freking also oversaw construction of 14 churches, 15 rectories, seven elementary schools, 22 religious education centers, five convents and the Newman Center. Freking also supervised 36 church renovations and expansions, and 59 priests were ordained while he was bishop. He was instrumental in the founding of the Bethany-St. Joseph Care Center for the elderly in La Crosse, a joint venture by the diocese and the Lutheran Church. Freking retired in 1983.

To replace Freking, Pope John Paul II named Auxiliary Bishop John Paul of La Crosse as its bishop in 1984. In 1986, Bishop Paul convened the fourth diocesan synod following the revised Canon Law of 1983; in 1987, the decrees of the fourth diocesan synod were published as: The Bishop With His People. In 1992, Bishop Paul founded the Aquinas Middle School in La Crosse. Bishop Paul retired in 1994.

=== 1994 to present ===
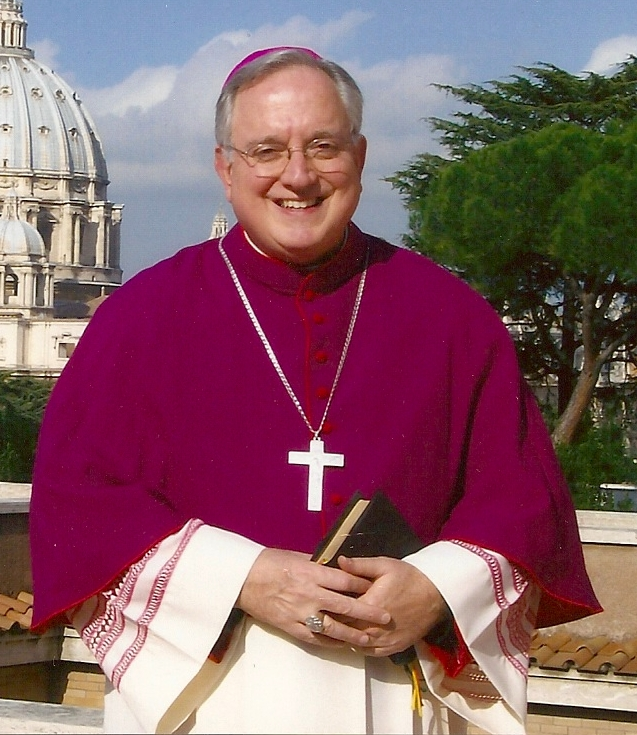
Bishop Callahan (2010)

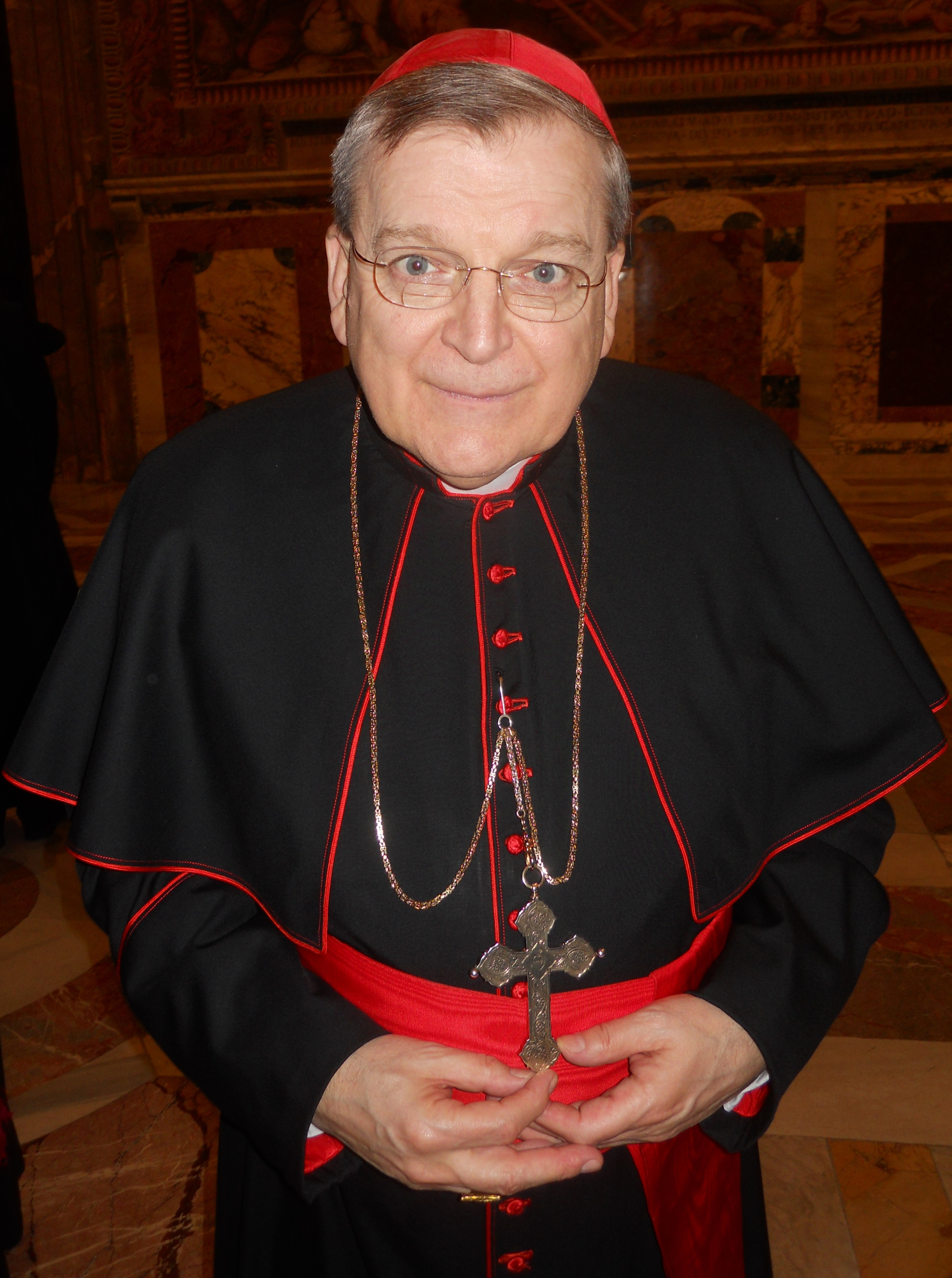
Cardinal Burke (2014)

Monsignor Raymond Leo Burke from La Crosse succeeded Paul as bishop of La Crosse; he named by John Paul II in 1994.

Burke was instrumental in the development of the Shrine of Our Lady of Guadalupe, which opened in La Crosse in 2004. Some critics said that construction of the $25 million Shrine of Our Lady of Guadalupe was wasteful of money that should have gone to the poor. Burke defended the shrine as being a fruitful way to raise spiritual devotion.

Another controversy was the diocese's withdrawal from Church World Service's annual Crop Walk because some of the money raised was being used to purchase condoms in developing countries. Burke also welcomed numerous traditional orders, including the Institute of Christ the King Sovereign Priest (ICKSP), whose priests offer exclusively the Tridentine Mass, to his diocese. Two priests left the diocese as a result of his policies.

Burke closed a number of schools while also raising teachers' salaries. His style was noted by some of his aides to be more formal than that of his predecessor Paul, although his aides described him as warm and approachable in private.

After nine years in La Crosse, John Paul II named Burke as archbishop in 2004 of the Archdiocese of St. Louis. The pope replaced Burke in La Crosse with Auxiliary Bishop Jerome Listecki of the Archdiocese of Chicago. At La Crosse, he initiated a $50 million fundraising campaign, a planning process to restructure ministry and parishes in the diocese.

In 2009, after three years, Pope Benedict XVI named Listecki as archbishop of Milwaukee.

Auxiliary Bishop William P. Callahan of Milwaukee, was named bishop of La Crosse by Benedict XVI in 2010. In August 2020, before the 2020 US presidential election, James Altman, pastor of St. James the Less Parish in La Crosse, stated in a YouTube video that “You cannot be Catholic and be a Democrat”, due to the party's support of legal access to abortion. Altman encouraged Catholic Democrats to “repent of your support of that party and its platform or face the fires of hell.” In July 2021, Callahan removed Altman as pastor of St. James and banned him from public preaching.

Pope Francis accepted Callahan's resignation from office on March 19, 2024, for health reasons. Francis that same day appointed Auxiliary Bishop Gerard W. Battersby of Detroit as the next bishop of La Crosse.

== Statistics ==
As of 2021, the Diocese of La Crosse had 144 diocesan priests, 61 permanent deacons and 197 nuns serving 159 parishes. The Catholic population of the diocese was approximately 163,600. The diocese hosts the following religious orders:

- Sisters of St. Joseph of the Third Order of St. Francis in Stevens Point
- Franciscan Sisters of Perpetual Adoration in La Crosse
- Franciscan Friars of the Immaculate in La Crosse
- Capuchins in Marathon
- Cistercians in Sparta
- Sisters of St Francis of the Martyr St George in La Crosse

=== Sex abuse ===
Bruce Ball was charged in Jackson County in June 1992 of causing a child to expose a sex organ. He had dared two boys to walk around with their genitals exposed. That same month, he was charged in Clark County of indecent touching, his victim a 12-year-old boy. During a police interview, he admitted to sexual abuse of four boys. In July 1992, as part of a plea bargain, prosecutors dropped the Jackson County charges and Ball pleaded guilty to sexual contact with a client. He was sentenced to five years in prison.

In January 2002, Timothy E. Svea from the Institute of Christ the King Sovereign in Wausau was charged with false imprisonment and exposing a child to harmful material. The abuse began when the victim, a church volunteer, was 15-years -old. During one incident in 1999, Svea handcuffed the victim to a bed and fondled him. Other victims were soon added to the case. Svea pleaded guilty in February 2002 to second-degree sexual assault of a child under age 16 and exposing himself to a child; he received a year and a half in prison.

In June 2020, Charlie Richmond, a chaplain at McDonell Central Catholic High School in Chippewa Falls, was charged with sexually assaulting a female minor between September 2016 and May 2017. The diocese then suspended Richmond from active ministry. The victim said that Richmond would inappropriately touch her and have her sit on his lap. In December 2021, Richmond pleaded no contest to fourth degree sexual assault, a misdemeanor, and was sentenced to one year of probation.

== Bishops ==
=== Bishops of La Crosse ===
1. Michael Heiss (1868–1880), appointed Archbishop of Milwaukee
2. Kilian Caspar Flasch (1881–1891)
3. James Schwebach (1891–1921)
4. Alexander Joseph McGavick (1921–1948)
5. John Patrick Treacy (1948–1964)
6. Frederick William Freking (1965–1983)
7. John Joseph Paul (1983–1994)
8. Raymond Leo Burke (1995–2004), appointed Archbishop of St. Louis and later Prefect of the Apostolic Signatura and Patron of the Order of Malta (elevated to Cardinal in 2010)
9. Jerome Edward Listecki (2004–2010), appointed Archbishop of Milwaukee
10. William P. Callahan (2010–2024)
11. Gerard Battersby (2024–present)

=== Auxiliary bishops ===
- William Richard Griffin (1935–1944)
- John Joseph Paul (1977–1983), appointed Bishop of La Crosse

=== Other diocesan priests who became bishops ===
- Robert Herman Flock, appointed Auxiliary Bishop of Cochabamba in 2012 and later Bishop of San Ignacio de Velasco
- George Albert Hammes, appointed Bishop of Superior in 1960

== Diocesan institutions ==
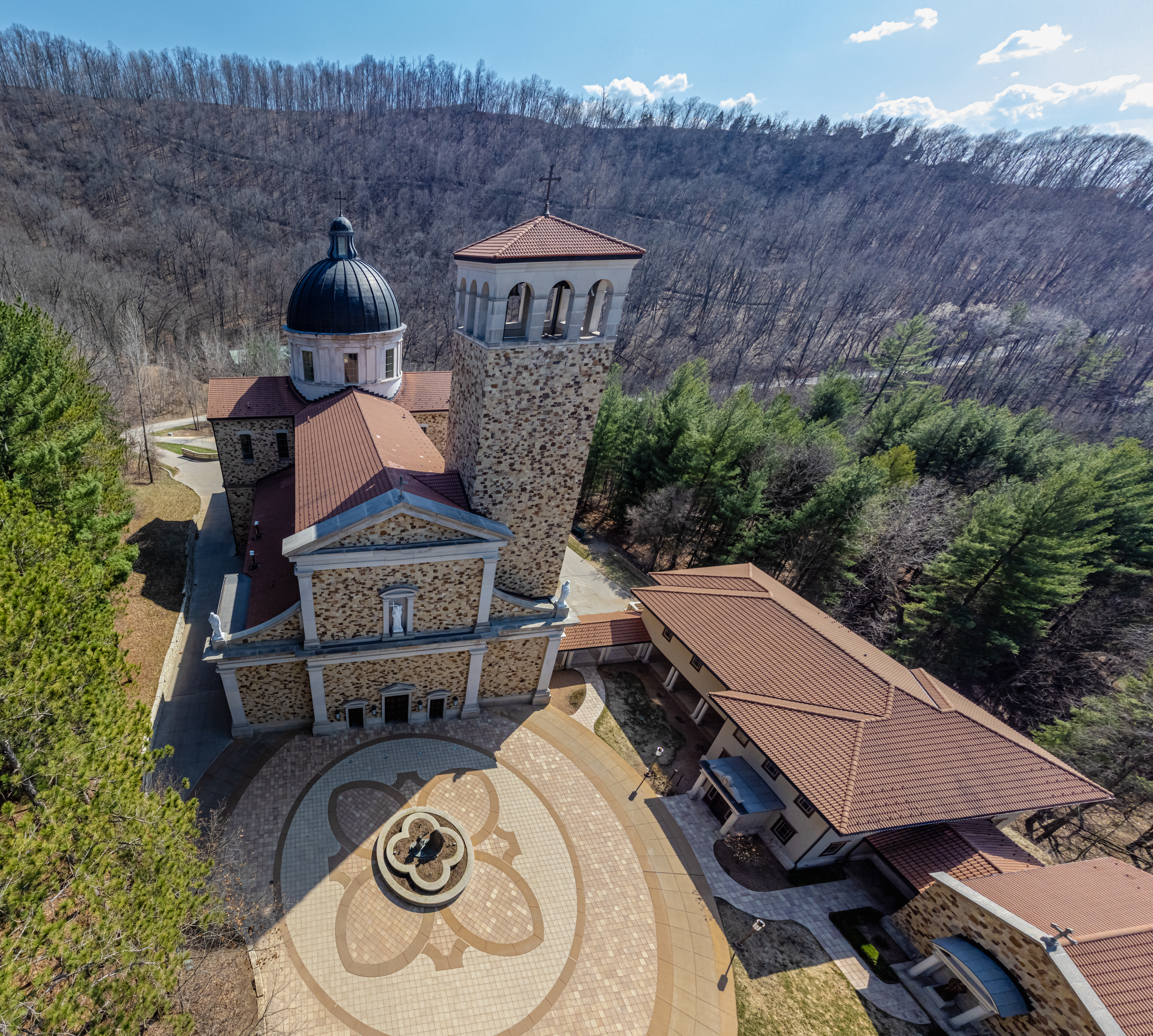
Shrine of Our Lady of Guadalupe, La Crosse, Wisconsin (2023)

Among the institutions in the Diocese of La Crosse are 10 Catholic-affiliated hospitals; St. Rose of Viterbo Convent, the motherhouse of the Franciscan Sisters of Perpetual Adoration, and the Shrine of Our Lady of Guadalupe in La Crosse. The first mass was held at the Shrine in 2008. In addition, the diocese sponsors Casa Hogar, an orphanage in Peru.

=== Universities ===
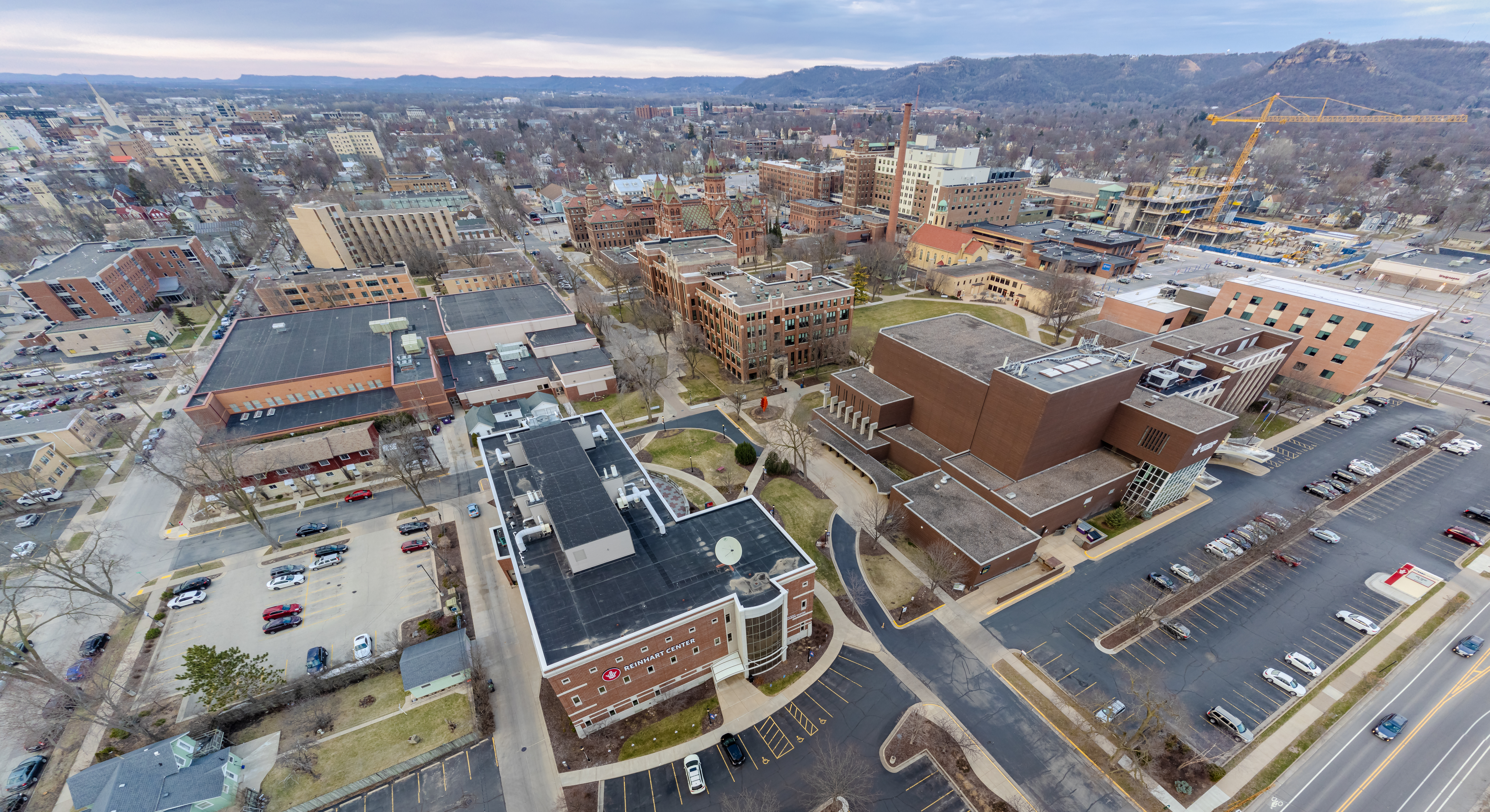
Viterbo University, La Crosse, Wisconsin (2023)

Viterbo University – La Crosse

=== High schools ===
- Aquinas High School – La Crosse
- Assumption High School – Wisconsin Rapids
- Columbus Catholic High School – Marshfield
- McDonell Central Catholic High School – Chippewa Falls
- Newman Catholic High School – Wausau
- Pacelli High School – Stevens Point
- Regis High School – Eau Claire

== Publications ==
The Diocese of La Crosse published a bi-weekly newspaper, The Catholic Times, until 2015. The Diocese continues to publish the Catholic Life magazine in print and online.
