= Drum (disambiguation) =

A drum is a musical instrument.

Drum, drums or The Drum may also refer to:

== Drums and drum-shaped items ==
- Drum (communication), a communication device
- Drum (container), a type of cylindrical container
- Drum brake, an automotive braking system
- Drum magazine, a cylindrical container for ammunition
- Drum memory, an early form of computer memory used in the 1950s and 1960s
- Electronic drum, in which sound is generated by an electronic waveform generator or sampler instead of by acoustic vibration
- Talking drum, an hourglass-shaped drum from West Africa
- Drum, the photoreceptor in a laser printer
- Drum or tholobate, in architecture, the lower part of a dome or cupola in the shape of a cylinder or prism

== Places ==
=== Great Britain ===
- The Drum (arts centre) in Birmingham, England
- Drum (Wales), a mountain in Wales
- The Drum, Edinburgh a location
- Drum, Perth and Kinross, a location
- Drum Castle, a castle in Aberdeenshire, Scotland
- Drum railway station, a closed station in Aberdeenshire

=== Ireland ===
- Drum, County Armagh, a townland in County Armagh, Northern Ireland
- Drum, County Londonderry, a townland in County Londonderry, Northern Ireland
- Drum, County Monaghan
- Drum, County Roscommon, a village in the Republic of Ireland
- Drum Manor Forest Park, a forest close to the Sperrin Mountains and Lough Neagh, Northern Ireland

=== United States ===
- Drum, Missouri
- "The Drum", nickname of Frank Erwin Center, former home court of the University of Texas at Austin's basketball teams
- Camp Drum (disambiguation), three military bases in the US
  - Fort Drum, originally named Camp Drum

=== Elsewhere ===
- Drum Islands, in the Canadian territory of Nunavut
- Drum, Croatia, a village in the municipality of Podbablje

== Entertainment ==
=== Books and magazines ===
- Drum, the 1962 novel by Kyle Onstott
- DRUM!, an American drumming magazine
- Drummer, an American gay BDSM magazine
- Drum (American magazine), an American gay culture, humor, and beefcake magazine
- Drum (South African magazine), a South African magazine
- The Drum (novel), by A. E. W. Mason
- Drums (comics), a 2011 supernatural comic book limited series
- Fredric Drum, protagonist of the Fredric Drum series of novels by Norwegian author Gert Nygårdshaug
- Drums, the 1925 debut novel by James Boyd, set in the American Revolutionary War

=== Film and television ===
- The Drum (1934 film), a British film directed by Sinclair Hill
- The Drum (1938 film), released in the U.S. as Drums, a British film starring Sabu, Raymond Massey and Roger Livesey
- Drum (1976 film), a sequel to the 1975 film Mandingo
- "Drum", a 2002 television ident for BBC Two from the Personality series
- Drum (2004 film), a South African film about a journalist of Drum magazine
- Drum (2016 film), an Iranian drama film set in Tehran
- The Drum (TV program), an Australian current affairs show that aired from 2010 until 2023

=== Music ===
==== Groups ====
- The Drum (band), a British musical group
- The Drums, an American musical group

==== Albums ====
- Drum (album), the first release from band Hugo Largo
- Drums (Oddjobs album), an album by hip-hop group Oddjobs
- The Drums (album), 2010 album by The Drums

==== Songs/tracks ====
- "The Drum" (song), a 1971 hit song for Bobby Sherman
- "Drum" (MØ song), 2016
- "Drum" (Noa Kirel song), 2019
- "Drums", an improvised percussion duet performed by the Grateful Dead as the first part of "Drums" and "Space"
- "The Drum", a 2022 Alan Walker track
- "The Drum", an instrumental by Arrested Development from Zingalamaduni
- "Drums", a song by Jesus Jones from 2004 EP Culture Vulture
- "Drums", a song by Johnny Cash from 1964 album Bitter Tears: Ballads of the American Indian
- "Drum", a song by Kylie Minogue from Tension
- "Drums", a song by P-MODEL from 1986 album One Pattern
- "The Drum", a 1974 song by Slapp Happy from Slapp Happy
- "Drum", a song by Sugababes from The Lost Tapes

== Sport ==
- Drum GAC, a Gaelic Athletic Association club based in Drum, County Londonderry, Northern Ireland
- Drums, nickname of Drumcondra F.C., an association football club in Dublin

== Other ==
- Drum (fish), any of several fish in the family Sciaenidae
- Drum (surname), including a list of people with the surname
- Drum (tobacco), a brand of tobacco, owned by parent company Imperial Tobacco
- Drum (yacht), a maxi yacht owned by Scottish car sales group Arnold Clark Automobiles
- Dodge Revolutionary Union Movement, Detroit, Michigan-based labor and political organization
- DRUMS, a microsatellite designed and operated by Kawasaki Heavy Industries

== See also ==
- Cylinder, the shape of a drum and objects in contexts such as machinery sometimes referred to as drums
- Drum kit (or drum set or trap set), a collection of drums, cymbals, and other percussion instruments.
- Drumlin, an elongated hill
- Drum line (disambiguation)
- Drummer (disambiguation)
- Drumming (disambiguation)
- "Drumming Song" (2009 song), a 2009 song by Florence and the Machine
- Drum Song (1978 album), a 1985 album by drummer Philly Joe Jones
- Guci, a type of Chinese song, also known as a drum-song
