= Drum (surname) =

Drum is a surname. Notable people with the surname include:

- Andrew B. Drum (1883–1955), officer in the United States Marine Corps
- Augustus Drum (1815–1858), Democratic member of the U.S. House of Representatives from Pennsylvania
- Chris Drum (born 1974), New Zealand cricketer
- Damian Drum (born 1960), Australian politician and former footballer and coach
- George W. Drum (1925–1997), early leader in automobile club circles
- Henry Drum (1857–1950), American politician
- Hugh Aloysius Drum (1879–1951), American general for whom Fort Drum is named
- Joseph Drum (1874–1926), American footballer and coach
- Julius Drum (1958–2007), Native American actor
- Kevin Drum (born 1958), American political blogger
- Marcus Drum (born 1987), Australian footballer
- Maximilian Drum (born 1991), German footballer
- Richard C. Drum (1825–1909), Adjutant General of the United States Army from 1880 to 1889

== See also ==
- Drum
- Drum (disambiguation)
- Drummond (surname)
