= 1st Armored Car Squadron =

1st Armored Car Squadron may refer to:

- 1st Armored Car Squadron (United States Marines), (1916–1922)
- 1st Armoured Car Squadron (Australia), (1946–1948)
