= John Joseph Paul =

Catholic bishop

His Excellency, The Most Reverend John Joseph Paul
- Bishop of La Crosse
- Church: Roman Catholic Church
- See: Diocese of La Crosse
- Predecessor: Frederick William Freking
- Successor: Raymond Leo Burke

Orders
- Ordination: January 24, 1943 by William Richard Griffin
- Consecration: August 4, 1977

Personal details
- Born: August 17, 1918 La Crosse, Wisconsin, US
- Died: March 5, 2006 (aged 87) La Crosse
- Education: Loras College; Marquette University

Styles of John Paul
- Reference style: The Most Reverend
- Spoken style: Your Excellency
- Religious style: Your Excellency
- Posthumous style: not applicable

John Joseph Paul (August 17, 1918 – March 5, 2006) was an American prelate of the Roman Catholic Church who served as an auxiliary bishop and bishop of the Diocese of La Crosse in Wisconsin from 1977 to 1994

== Biography ==
=== Early years ===
John Paul was born on August 17, 1918, in La Crosse, Wisconsin. He graduated from Aquinas High School in La Crosse in 1935 and from Loras College in Dubuque, Iowa in 1939.

=== Ordination and ministry ===
Paul was ordained to the priesthood on January 24, 1943, by Auxiliary Bishop William Griffin at St. Rose of Viterbo Convent in La Crosse, the motherhouse of the Franciscan Sisters of Perpetual Adoration. While stationed in Eau Claire, Wisconsin, Paul help established Regis High School.

In 1955, Paul became rector of Holy Cross Seminary in La Crosse. On October 7, 1956, Pope Pius XII made Paul a monsignor. In 1956, Paul received a master's degree in education from Marquette University. In 1966, Paul became rector of the Cathedral of St. Joseph the Workman in La Crosse.

=== Auxiliary Bishop and Bishop of La Crosse ===
Paul was appointed auxiliary bishop for the Diocese of La Crosse on May 17, 1977, by Pope Paul VI. John Paul was consecrated on August 4, 1977.

On October 14, 1983, Paul was appointed bishop of La Crosse by Pope John Paul II, succeeding Bishop Frederick Freking. On December 5, 1983, he was installed as bishop. In 1986, Paul convened the fourth diocesan synod following the revised Canon Law of 1983; in 1987, the decrees of the fourth diocesan synod were published as: The Bishop With His People. In 1992, Paul founded the Aquinas Middle School in La Crosse.

=== Retirement and death ===
On December 10, 1994, Paul submitted his resignation as bishop of La Crosse to John Paul II; he was succeeded by Bishop Raymond Burke. John Paul died at Franciscan Skemp Medical Center in La Crosse on March 5, 2006, at age 87.

== See also ==
- Catholic Church hierarchy
- Catholic Church in the United States
- Historical list of the Catholic bishops of the United States
- List of Catholic bishops of the United States
- Lists of patriarchs, archbishops, and bishops

Catholic Church titles
Preceded by Frederick William Freking	Bishop of La Crosse; 1983–1994	Succeeded by Raymond Leo Burke
Preceded by –	Auxiliary Bishop of La Crosse; 1977–1983	Succeeded by –
