= Drumhead (disambiguation) =

A drumhead is a membrane stretched over one or both of the open ends of a drum.

Drumhead may also refer to:

- Drumhead (sign), a type of circular sign that was used on many railroads
- Drumhead court-martial, a court-martial which takes place on the battlefield
- "The Drumhead," an episode of Star Trek: The Next Generation
- Drumhead, a drumming magazine
- Drumhead, Nova Scotia
- Eardrum, the membrane present in the ear.

== See also ==
- Drum (disambiguation)
