= William Richard Griffin =

American Catholic bishop

William Richard Griffin (September 1, 1882 – March 18, 1944) was an American prelate of the Roman Catholic Church who served as auxiliary bishop of the Diocese of La Crosse, Wisconsin.

== Biography ==
Griffin born in Chicago, Illinois. He was ordained to the Roman Catholic priesthood on May 25, 1907, for the Archdiocese of Chicago.

On March 9, 1935, he was appointed auxiliary bishop for the Diocese of La Crosse and titular bishop of Lydda. He was consecrated as bishop on May 1, 1935.

On January 24, 1943, the future Bishop John Joseph Paul was ordained to the Roman Catholic priesthood by Bishop Griffin at St. Rose of Viterbo Convent in La Crosse, the motherhouse of the Franciscan Sisters of Perpetual Adoration.

Bishop Griffin died in La Crosse, Wisconsin, and was buried in Calvary Cemetery, Chicago.

Catholic Church titles
| Preceded by – | Auxiliary Bishop of La Crosse; 1935–1944 | Succeeded by – |
