= Fredric Drum =

Series of novels by Gert Nygårdshaug

Fredric Drum is a series of ten crime fiction novels by Norwegian author Gert Nygårdshaug that were published over the course of 21 years, starting in 1985. The series is named after the protagonist of the novels.

Outside Norway the Fredric Drum series has been published in Denmark, Germany, Poland and Russia.

== Character biography ==
Cover of Honningkrukken (1985), the first publication of the Fredric Drum series

The character Fredric Drum is a gourmet master chef, a connoisseur of fine wine, the proprietor of a small Michelin-starred restaurant in Oslo named Kasserollen, a cryptographer, and an amateur detective with a strong sense of curiosity. His adventures frequently take place in exotic locations such as France, Østerdalen, Italy, Egypt, Mexico and New Guinea, and with considerable focus on various ancient cultures, such as the Minoan civilisation or Ancient Egypt, whose myths and archaeological mysteries Drum are frequently drawn to.

Drum's uncle, Skarphedin Olsen, is a police investigator with the National Criminal Investigation Service.

== Response ==
The series has been called among Norwegian crime literature's most playful and original. Critics have claimed to identify references in the series to works by other authors such as Knut Hamsun and Umberto Eco.

With a stated target of completing ten books of the series, Nygårdshaug published the final Fredric Drum novel in 2006, and it was consensus among critics that the series maintained the same level of quality to the very end.

Though Nygårdshaug has worked within a wide range of genres throughout his career including poetry and children's literature, and won a people's award for "Best Norwegian Book of All Time" with Mengele Zoo, he is arguably best known for his Fredric Drum series.

In the wake of the series' success, there has been arranged theme tours with Nygårdshaug, "in the footsteps of Fredric Drum", to Saint-Émilion.

== Series bibliography ==
- Honningkrukken (1985, The Honey Jar)
- Jegerdukken (1987, The Hunter's Puppet)
- Dødens codex (1990, The Codex of Death)
- Det niende prinsipp (1992, The Ninth Principle)
- Cassandras finger (1993, Finger of Cassandra)
- Kiste nummer fem (1996, Coffin Number Five)
- Den balsamerte ulven (2000, The Embalmed Wolf)
- Liljer fra Jerusalem (2001, Lilies from Jerusalem)
- Alle orkaners mor (2004, The Mother of All Hurricanes)
- Rødsonen (2006, The Red Zone)
