= Gert Nygårdshaug =

Norwegian author (born 1946)

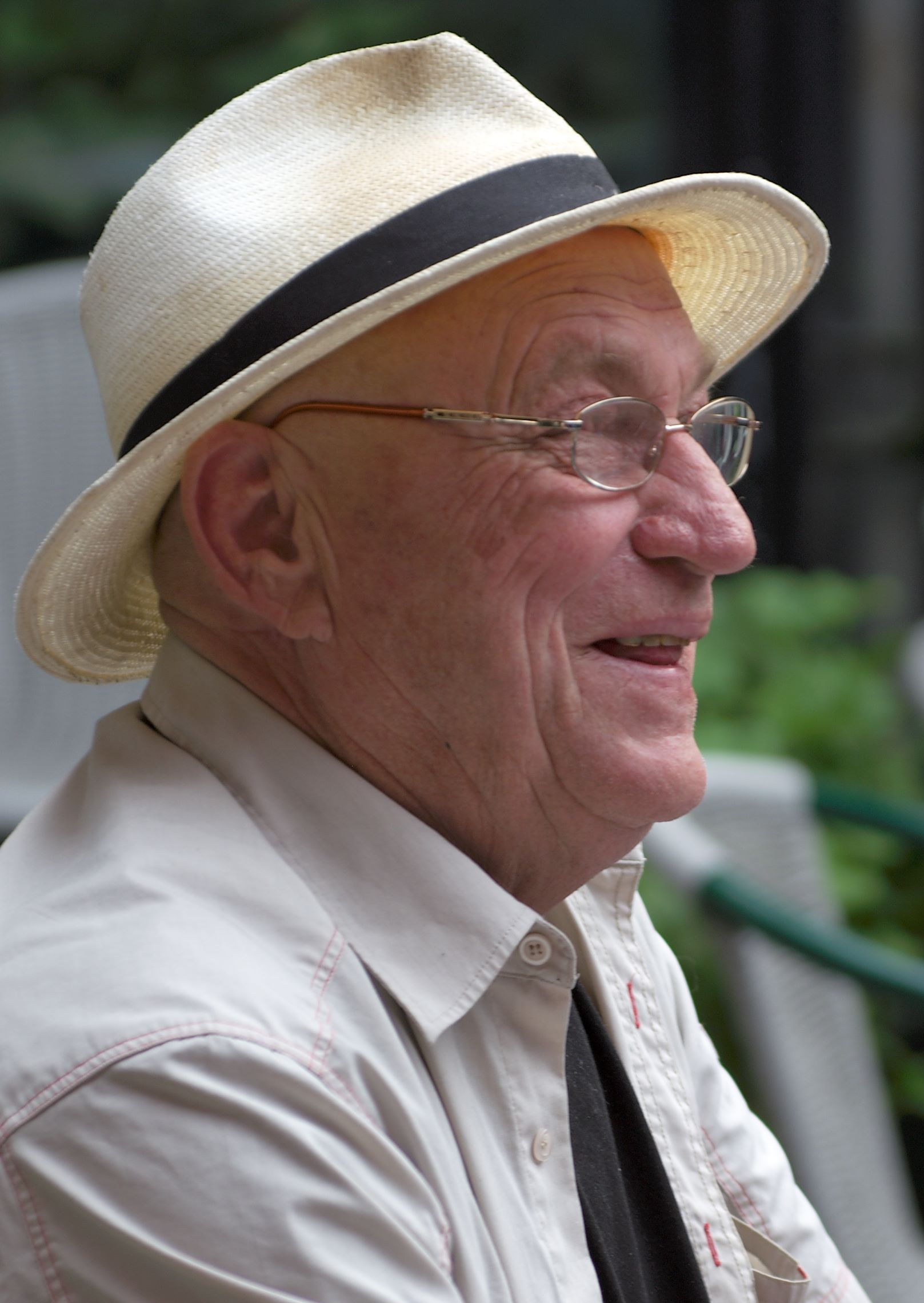
- Nygårdshaug at the 2011 Oslo Book Festival
- Born: Gert Hermod Nygårdshaug; 22 March 1946 (age 80); Tynset, Norway
- Occupation: Author
- Writing career
- Genres: Poetry, children's books, novels
- Notable work: Crime fiction novels featuring Fredric Drum

Gert Hermod Nygårdshaug (born 22 March 1946 at Tynset) is a Norwegian author. He has written poems, children's books and novels, and is in particular known for the series of crime novels featuring the gastronomer amateur detective Fredric Drum.

Nygårdshaug's writing enjoys a diverse background from his extensive knowledge and travelling, in particular in South America. Ancient cultures, archaeology, fly fishing, gastronomy and wine are some of the recurring themes in his novels based on his own personal interests and hobbies.

In 2004 the South African film company Lithium Entertainment bought the film rights to four of Nygårdshaug's books: Mengele Zoo, Himmelblomsttreets muligheter (Heaven’s Flower Tree), Prost Gotvins geometri (Priest Gotvin’s Geometry) and Afrodites basseng (The Pool of Aphrodite).

The eco crime novel Mengele Zoo (1989) was in 2007 voted "the People's Favourite" during the literature festival of Lillehammer.

Nygårdshaug resides in Lier, and has been a minor ticket candidate for the political party Red.

== List of works ==
- Impulser (1966) poems
- Paxion (1971) poems
- Et bilde et verktøy (1974) poems
- Gatevinden (1980) poems
- Solfiolinen (1981) short stories
- Bastionen (1982) novel
- Alkymisten (1983) short stories
- Dverghesten (1984) novel
- Honningkrukken (1985) crime novel
- Nullpluss (1986) novel
- Jegerdukken (1987) crime novel
- Gipsyblink (1988) poems
- Mengele Zoo (1989) novel
- Dødens codex (1990) crime novel
- Søthjerte (1991) Novel
- Det niende prinsipp (1992) crime novel
- Cassandras finger (1993) crime novel
- Gipsymann (1994) poems
- Trollet og de syv prinsessene (1995) children's stories
- Himmelblomsttreets muligheter (1995) novel
- Kiste nummer fem (1996) crime novel
- Gutten og trollsverdet (1996) children's stories
- Huldergubben i Svartberget (1997) children's stories
- Prost Gotvins geometri (1998) novel
- Pengegryta i Trollberget – og andre eventyr (1999) children's stories
- Den balsamerte ulven (2000) crime novel
- Liljer fra Jerusalem (2001) crime novel
- Farivis Ruvis - Gutten fra himmelrommet - Dinosaurene (2001) children's stories
- Afrodites basseng (2003) novel
- Alle orkaners mor (2004) crime novel
- Rødsonen (2006) crime novel
- Fortellernes marked (2008) novel
- Klokkemakeren (2009) novel
- Samlede eventyr (2009) children's stories
- Chimera (2011) novel
- Pergamentet (2013) novel
- Nøkkelmakeren (2014) novel
- Eclipse i mai (2015) novel
- Budbringeren (2016) crime novel
- Zoo Europa (2018) novel
- Regnmakeren (2019) novel
- Den tredje engelen (2020) crime novel
- Skomakeren (2024) novel
- Med sommerfuglhåv i Amazonas (2024) travelogue
- Den røde døren (2025) novel

Awards
Preceded by Erik Bye, Tor Bomann-Larsen	Recipient of the Cappelen Prize; 1996	Succeeded by Erlend Loe
