= Drummer (disambiguation) =

A drummer is someone who creates music using drums.

Drummer may also refer to:

- Drummer (military), personnel who play military drums
- Drummer (soil), state soil of Illinois
- Drummer (album), by G Flip, 2023
- Drummer (band), American indie rock group formed in 2009
- Drummer (magazine), American BDSM and leather subculture publication
- Drummer (cockroach), Central American insect known as Blaberus discoidalis
- Drummer, a private in the Corps of Drums in the British Army
- Drummer, a character in the Planetary comics series

== Other uses ==
- Camina Drummer, a character in science fiction novel series The Expanse

== See also ==
- The Drummer (disambiguation)
