= King armored car =

American armored car

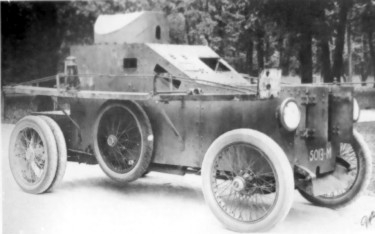
- Type: Armored car
- Place of origin: United States of America

Service history
- In service: 1916-1934
- Used by: United States Marine Corps
- Wars: Banana Wars

Production history
- Manufacturer: Armored Motor Car Company (AMC)

Specifications
- Armor: 12 mm (0.47 in)
- Main armament: M1895 Colt–Browning; Lewis Machine Gun on later models
- Engine: V8 petrol

The King armored car was manufactured by the Armored Motor Car Company (AMC). It was the first American armored vehicle, and was ordered by the United States Marine Corps in 1915 for testing before being used by the 1st Armored Car Squadron, which consisted of eight cars. The 1st Armored Car Squadron was the US's first formal armored unit.

== Description ==
The car had one Lewis gun ([M1909 Benet-Mercie machine gun] on earlier models) mounted in an armored turret to protect the gunner from small arms fire. It was designed to be quite easy to transport. It could be taken ashore whole or it could be broken down into smaller pieces to put into motor launches, taken ashore, and reassembled on the beach. However, it could not be considered an unqualified success, as it was not very reliable. This problem was compounded by a lack of qualified mechanics, and replacement parts were few and far between.

== Service ==
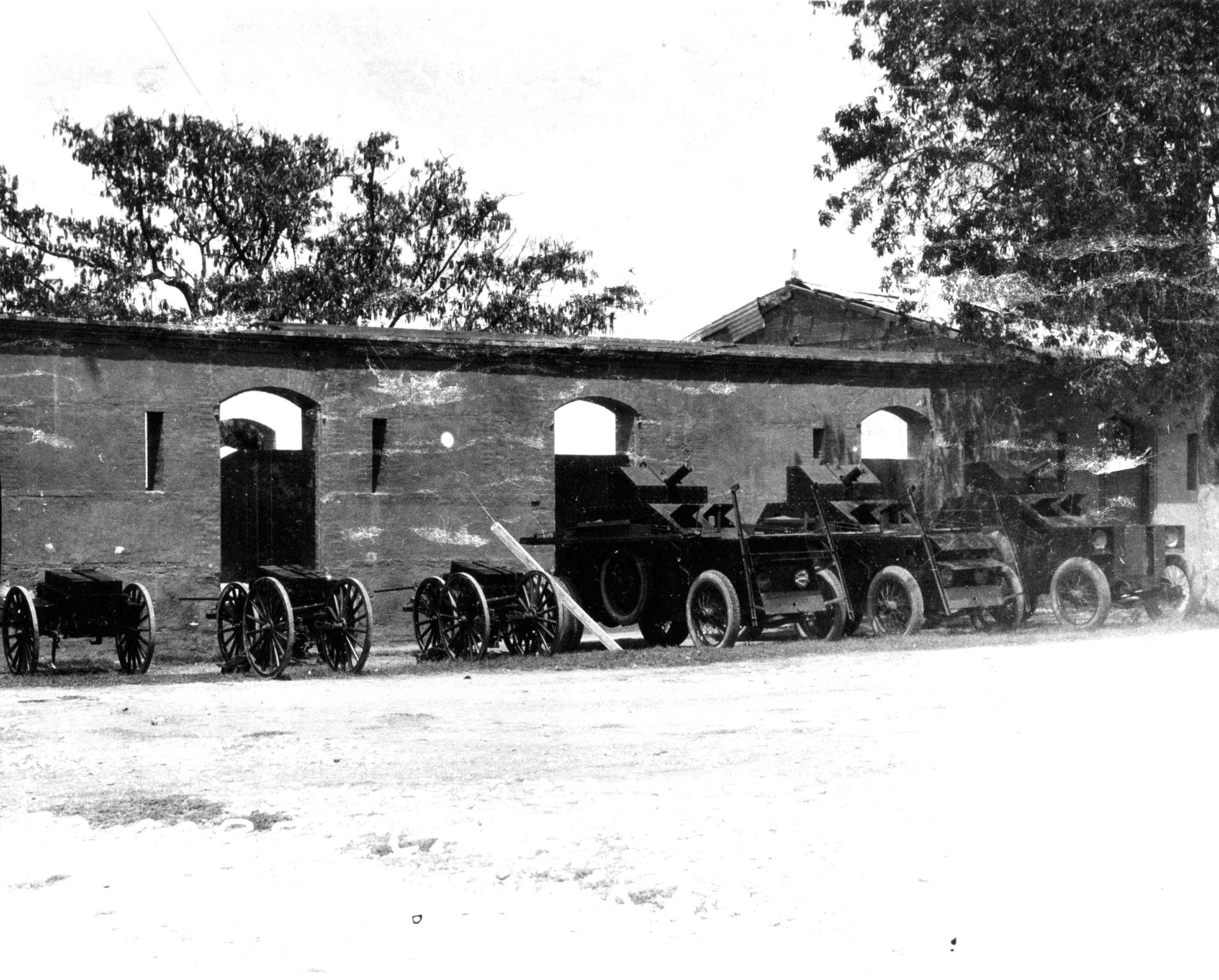
King armored cars in Haiti, sometime after 1921

The 1st Armored Truck Squadron did not see any action during World War I. During World War I, General Pershing refused USMC Commandant George Barnett's offer of a Marine division. Had General Pershing accepted General Barnett's offer, it is highly probable that the 1st Armored Car Squadron would have been sent along with it. The 1st Armored Car Squadron was disbanded in 1921. Five of the vehicles were used in Haiti and Santo Domingo until 1927, and all of the cars were finally disposed of in 1934

== Units ==
- USMC 1st Armored Car Squadron
