= Drumming (disambiguation) =

Drumming may refer to:

- the act of playing the drums or other percussion instruments
- Drumming (Reich), a musical composition written by Steve Reich in 1971 for percussion ensemble
- Drumming (snipe), mechanical sound produced by snipe in the course of aerial courtship displays
- the rapid, repetitive series of strikes of a woodpecker's bill on a tree or other substrate to establish territory or attract a mate
- a mating display of animals such as birds, often in connection with a lek

== See also ==
- Drumming out, an informal military ceremony to dishonorably discharge soldiers
- Drum (disambiguation)
