= Andrew B. Drum =

American soldier (1883–1955)

Andrew Boggs Drum (4 December 1883 – 22 January 1955) was an officer in the United States Marine Corps. He was born in Winchester, Virginia, and moved to Washington, D.C., when he was nine. His father, Andrew B. Drum, Sr., was superintendent of Arlington National Cemetery from 1892 to 1906. He graduated from Western High School in Washington D.C. in 1903 and was commissioned a second lieutenant in the Marine Corps in 1905. Prior to joining the Marines, he had served in the National Guard of the District of Columbia.

In 1906, he served for a short time with then Major John A. Lejeune aboard the protected cruiser USS Columbia.

On 17 May 1910, First Lieutenant Drum began a tour of duty at the Marine barracks in Annapolis, Maryland.

From 1914 to 1915, Drum was First Lieutenant of Marines aboard the USS South Carolina. While in charge of South Carolina's Marines, he participated in raising the United States flag during the occupation of Veracruz. Sixty-eight years earlier, his grandfather, Captain Simon Drum (West Point Class of 1829), had been present at the flag raising in that city during the Siege of Veracruz.

In 1916, Captain Drum was the founding officer of the new 1st Armored Car Squadron, 1st Marine Regiment at Philadelphia. The squadron never saw combat, and was disbanded in 1921.

He was promoted to captain on 22 May 1917 and commanded the 15th Company when it was assigned to the 5th Marine Regiment. His regiment became part of the American Expeditionary Force when the United States deployed forces to fight in World War I. By February 1918, he was director of the American Anti-Aircraft Artillery school in Langres, France, where he developed unique methods of training anti-aircraft gunners and provided air defense of the area near the school.

He was promoted to major on 4 June 1920.

In 1930, Lieutenant Colonel Drum took command of a battalion of 10th Marines. In December 1931, Battery B (the first unit to be equipped with the 75mm pack howitzer was attached to 1st Battalion, 1st Marines, with LtCol Drum as battalion commander. The next month, the battalion deployed aboard the battleships USS Arkansas and USS Wyoming (BB-32) for a 10-week training cruise, participated in military reviews, Mardi Gras in New Orleans and Galveston, transited the Panama Canal and traveled up the west coast to Bremerton, Washington. In 1932 Drum was relieved and returned to his regular command at Marine Corps Base Quantico. In July 1933, after his unit, Headquarters and Headquarters Battery, was merged with Service Battery to become Headquarters and Service Battery, he was relieved by Major Fred S. N. Erskine.

From September 1934 to September 1935, LtCol Drum was commander of 6th Marines.

He served in World War II, eventually reaching the rank of colonel, and died on 22 January 1955. He is buried alongside his wife in Arlington National Cemetery.
