= Mardi Gras in the United States =

Celebration

Mardi Gras in the United States is celebrated in a number of cities and regions in the country. Most of these places trace their Mardi Gras celebrations to French, Spanish, and other Catholic colonial influences on the settlements over their history.

One of the earliest Carnival observations in North America is said to have occurred at a place on the west bank of the Mississippi River about 60 miles (97 km) downriver from where New Orleans is today. This Mardi Gras was observed on March 3, 1699, and in honor of this holiday, Pierre Le Moyne d'Iberville, a 38-year-old French Canadian, named the spot Point du Mardi Gras ("Mardi Gras Point") near Fort Jackson. D'Iberville's journals make no reference to any celebration taking place at Point du Mardi Gras, and the first attributed celebration of the holiday in North America took place near present-day Mobile, Alabama in 1703.

The earliest organized Carnival celebrations occurred in Mobile, then the capitol of French Louisiana known as Fort Louis de la Mobile, where in 1704 the first known Carnival secret society (Masque de la Mobile) was formed. In 1856, six Protestant businessmen established the first secret society, or krewe, in New Orleans, the Mistick Krewe of Comus.

Former French and Spanish colonies such as Pensacola, Biloxi, and settlements along the Gulf Coast all followed suit in incorporating Carnival into their annual celebrations, which today have developed either separate traditions or variations of them from one another. In addition, modern activities generally vary from city to city across the U.S.

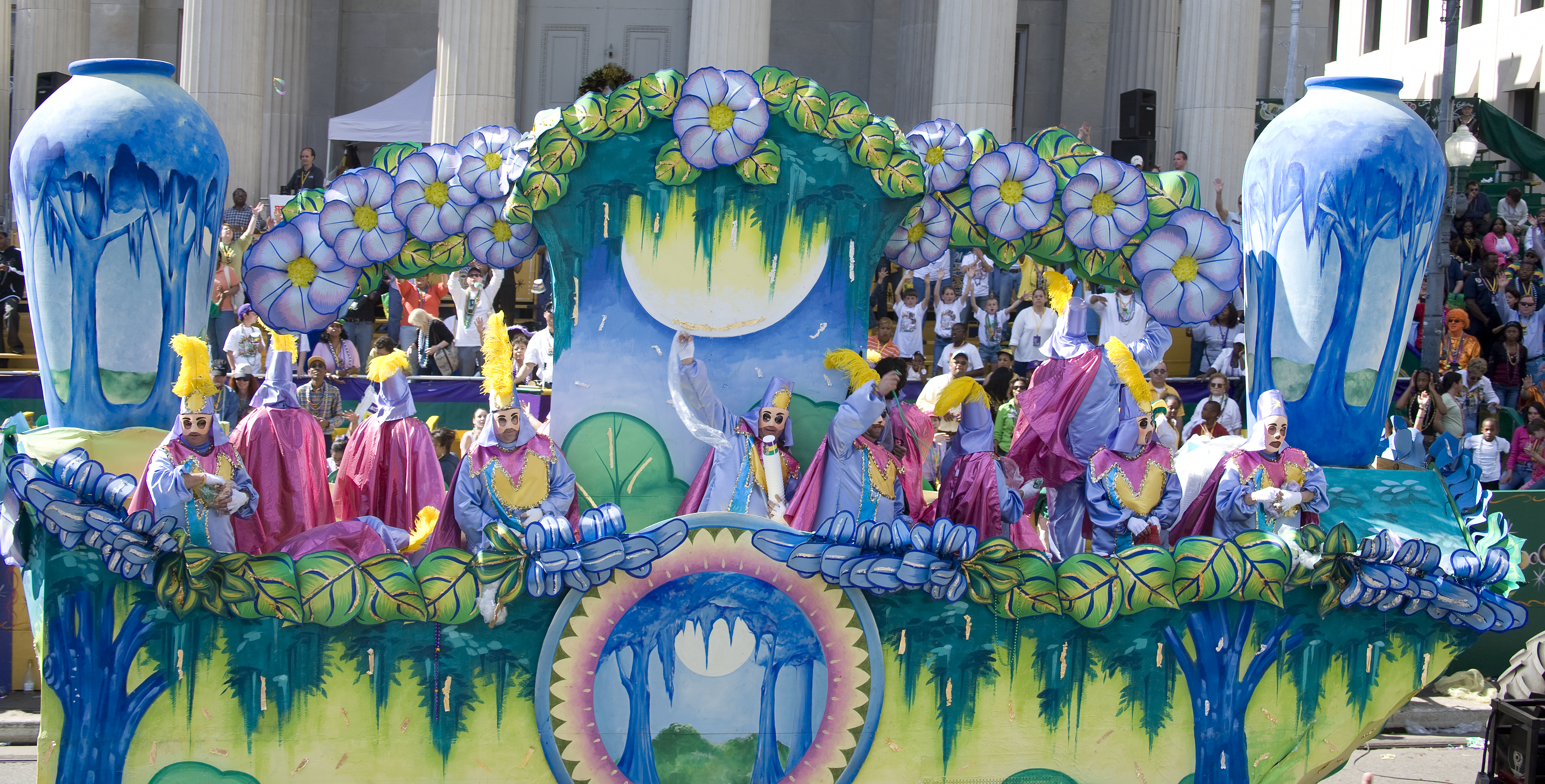
The Mardi Gras celebrations in New Orleans are probably the most famous in the United States, but they are far from the only such celebrations.

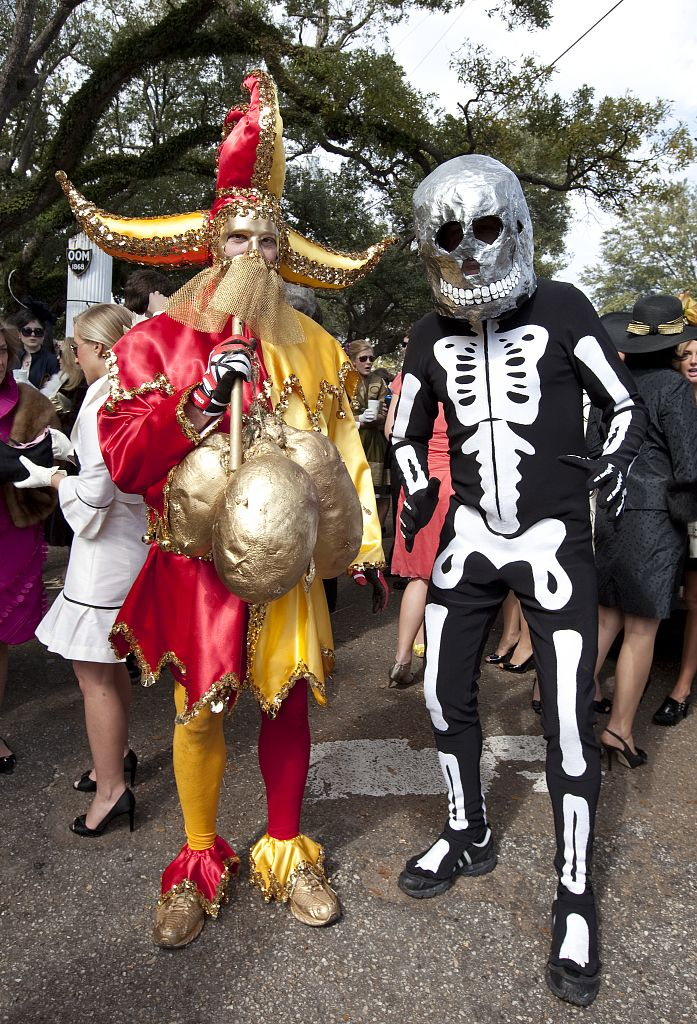
"Folly" and "Death" from Mobile, Alabama's Order of Myths mystic society, one of that city's longest Mardi Gras traditions

== Early days in the American colonies ==
Mardi Gras arrived in North America as a sedate French Catholic tradition with the Le Moyne brothers, Pierre Le Moyne d'Iberville and Jean-Baptiste Le Moyne de Bienville, in the late 17th century, when King Louis XIV sent the pair to defend France's claim on the territory of Louisiane, which included what are now the U.S. states of Alabama, Mississippi, and Louisiana.

The expedition, led by Iberville, entered the mouth of the Mississippi River on the evening of March 2, 1699, Lundi Gras, not yet knowing it was the river explored and claimed for France by René-Robert Cavelier, Sieur de La Salle in 1683. The party proceeded upstream to a place on the west bank about 60 miles (97 km) downriver from where New Orleans is today, where a small tributary emptied into the great river, and made camp in what is now Plaquemines Parish, Louisiana. This was on March 3, 1699, Mardi Gras day, so in honor of this holiday, Iberville named the spot Point du Mardi Gras (French: "Mardi Gras Point") and called the small tributary Bayou Mardi Gras. Bienville went on to found Mobile, Alabama, in 1702 as the first capital of French Louisiana. In 1703, French settlers in that city began to celebrate the Mardi Gras tradition. By 1720, Biloxi was made the capital of Louisiana. While it had French settlers, Mardi Gras and other customs were celebrated with more fanfare given its new status. In 1723, the capital of French Louisiana was moved to New Orleans, founded in 1718. With the growth of New Orleans as a city and the creolization of different cultures, the varied celebration of Mardi Gras became the event most strongly associated with the city. In more recent times, several U.S. cities without a French Catholic heritage have instituted the celebration of Mardi Gras, which sometimes emerged as grassroots movements to help accompany single people to celebrate something in late winter which is often dominated by the commercialized and couple-centric Valentine's Day, and as a result it has been co-opted as the single people's late winter holiday.

== Alabama ==
Mardi Gras is an official state holiday in Mobile and Baldwin counties. Other counties in the state grant employees a day of personal leave in lieu of Mardi Gras.

=== Mobile ===
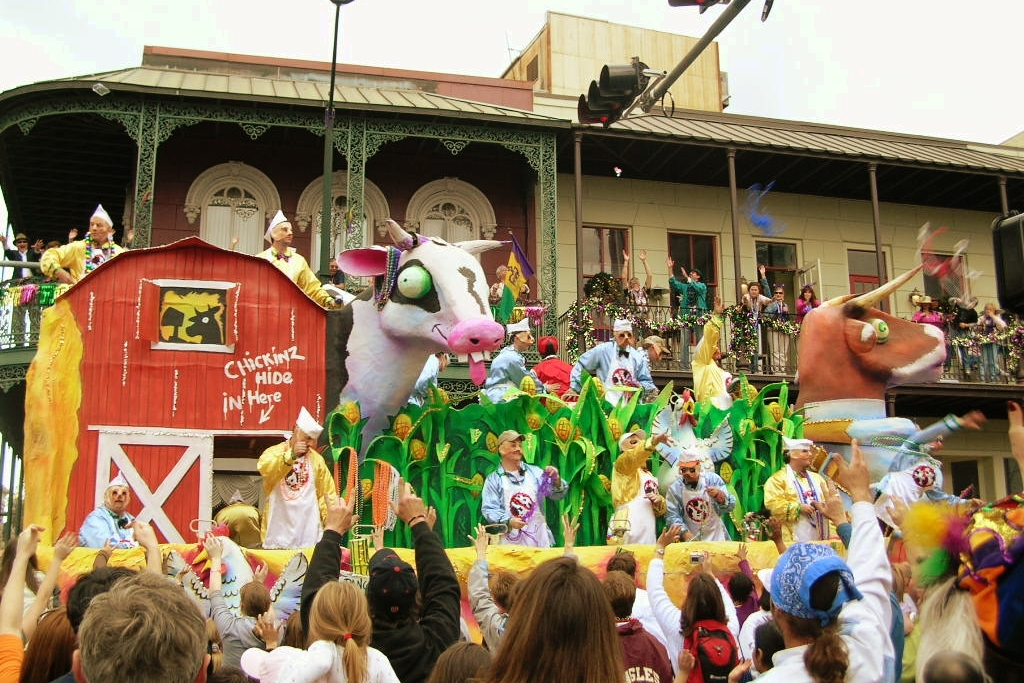
A Mardi Gras parade on Royal Street in Mobile during the 2006 season

Mobile, founded by Bienville in 1702, is known for having the oldest organized Mardi Gras celebrations in the United States, beginning in 1703. It was also host to the first formally organized Mardi Gras parade in the United States in 1830.

Mobile's Mardi Gras celebrations revolve around mystic societies, private social organizations that have been a fundamental part of the social and business fabric of the city. The mystic societies are organizations, similar to krewes in New Orleans, that present parades, masked balls, and activities for the enjoyment of its members, guests, and the public. Mystic society membership is secret. The mystic societies build colorful Carnival floats and parade throughout downtown Mobile during the Carnival season with masked society members tossing small gifts, known as "throws", to the parade spectators. Throws were first introduced in Mobile during an 1837 Cowbellion de Rakin Society parade. They initially consisted of sugar plumbs, kisses, and oranges. Currently, throws may be trinkets, candy, cookies, peanuts, women's panties, artificial roses, stuffed animals, doubloons, cups, hats, can coolers, Frisbees, medallion necklaces, bead necklaces of every variety, and the iconic Moon Pies.

Mobile's mystic societies give formal masquerade balls, known as bal masqués, which are almost always invitation only and are oriented to adults. Attendance at a ball requires that a strict dress code, or costume de rigueur, be followed. The formal dress code usually involves full-length evening gowns for women and white tie with tails for male invited guests, and masked costumes for society members. The balls feature dramatic entertainment, music, dancing, food, and drinks. Balls are usually based upon a theme which is carried out through scenery, decorations, costumes, and a tableau vivant.

Mobile first celebrated Carnival in 1703 when French settlers began the festivities at the Old Mobile Site. Mobile's first Carnival society was organized in 1704, when Nicholas Langlois founded Société de Saint Louis.

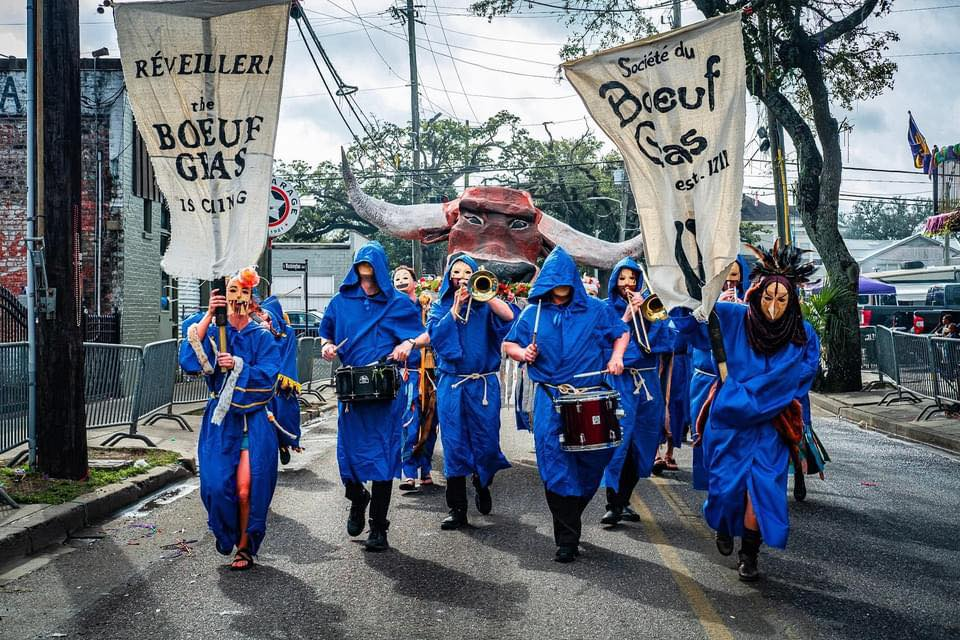
Societe du Boeuf Gras in Mobile

In 1711 it was renamed the Societe du Boeuf Gras (Fatted Ox Society) (1711–1861, 2022–present). In 1830 Mobile's Cowbellion de Rakin Society was the first formally organized and masked mystic society in the United States to celebrate with a parade. The Cowbellions got their start when Michael Krafft, a cotton factor from Pennsylvania, began a parade with participants' carrying rakes, hoes, and cowbells. The "Cowbellions" introduced horse-drawn floats to the parades in 1840 with a parade entitled, "Heathen Gods and Goddesses". The Striker's Independent Society was formed in 1843. It is the oldest surviving mystic society or krewe in the United States.

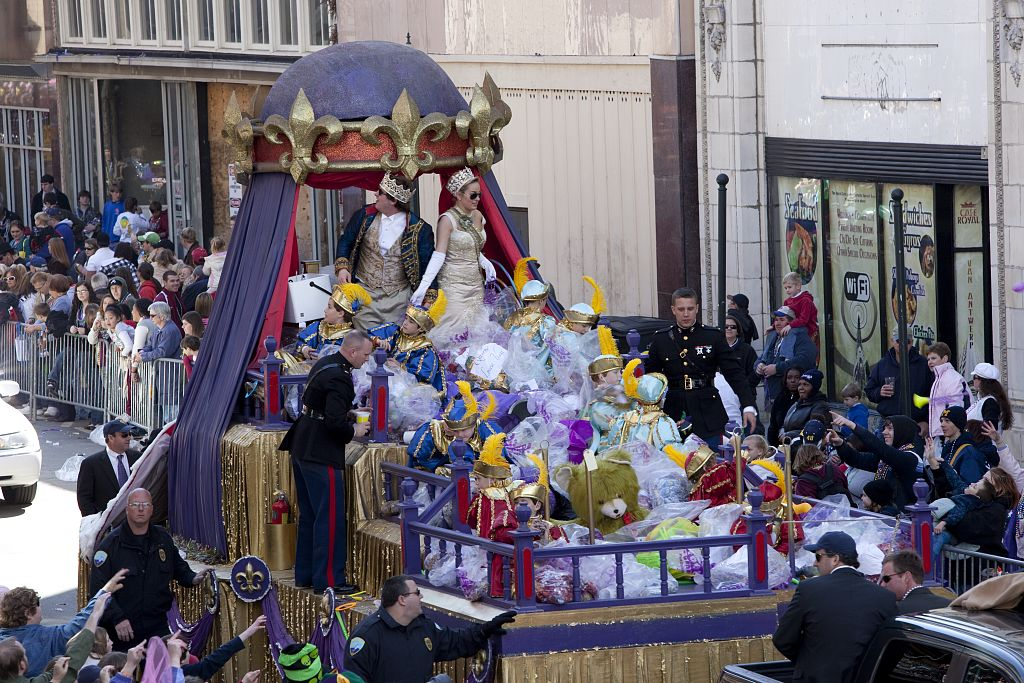
King Felix III and the queen of the Mobile Carnival Association aboard the MCA crown float on Royal Street during the 2010 season

In 1856 six businessmen, formerly of Mobile, gathered at a club room in New Orlean's French Quarter to organize a secret society to observe Mardi Gras with a formal parade. They founded New Orleans' first and oldest krewe, the Mistick Krewe of Comus. Carnival celebrations in Mobile were cancelled during the American Civil War. In 1866 Joe Cain revived the Mardi Gras parades by portraying a fictional Chickasaw chief named Slacabamorinico while parading in costume through the city streets on Fat Tuesday. He celebrated the day in front of Union Army occupation troops. The Order of Myths, Mobile's oldest mystic society that continues to parade, was founded in 1867 and held its first parade on Mardi Gras night in 1868. The Infant Mystics also began to parade on Mardi Gras night in 1868, but later moved their parade to Lundi Gras.

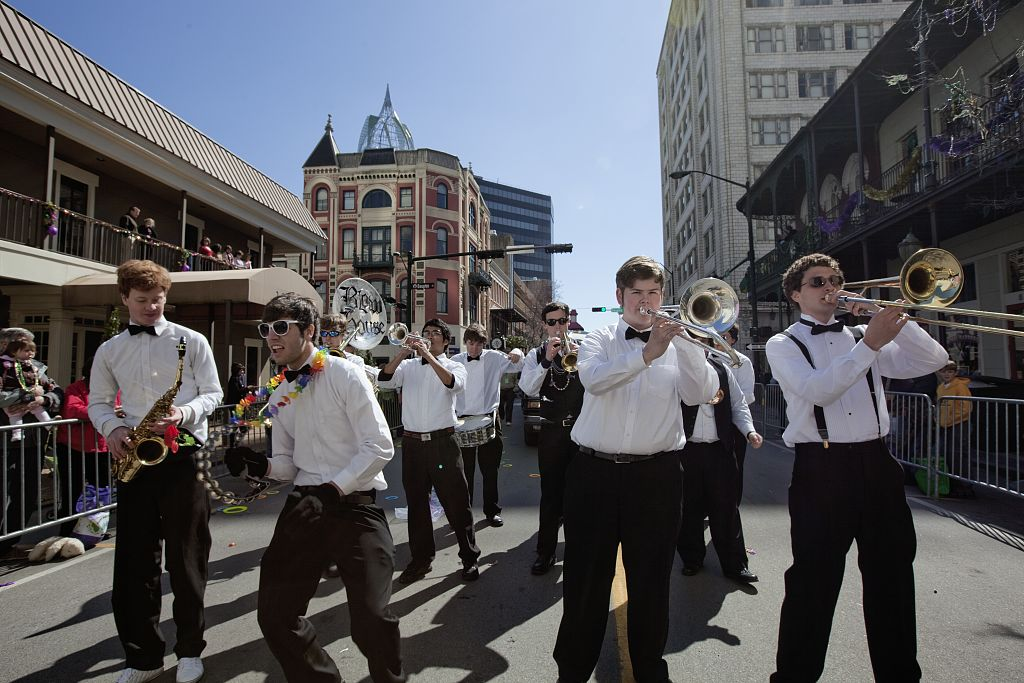
Blow House in the Order of Athena parade down Royal Street during the 2010 season

The Mobile Carnival Association was formed in 1871 to coordinate the events of Mardi Gras. That year was also the occasion of the First Royal Court at which was crowned the first king of Carnival, Emperor Felix I. The Comic Cowboys of Wragg Swamp were established in 1884, along with their mission of satire and free expression. The Continental Mystic Crew mystic society was founded in 1890; it was Mobile's first Jewish mystic society. In 1894 the Order of Doves mystic society was founded and held its first Mardi Gras ball. It was the first African-American mystic society in Mobile. In 1929 the Infant Mystics, the second oldest society that continues to parade, introduced the first electric floats to Mobile. In 1939 the Colored Carnival Association was founded and had its first parade; it was later renamed the Mobile Area Mardi Gras Association. In 1980 the Order of Osiris, the oldest surviving gay and lesbian mystic society in Mobile, held its first ball. In 1995 the 1st Mobile International Carnival Ball was held, with every known Mobile mystic society in attendance. In 2002, Mobile celebrated its Tricentennial with parades representing every known mystic society. A documentary film, The Order of Myths, was released in 2008 with a focus on Mardi Gras celebrations and how race and class influences many aspects of Mardi Gras in the city, including the mystic societies. According to statistics from the Alabama Tourism Department, Mobile Mardi Gras is the most-attended annual event in the state. The event attracted more than 800,000 people in 2010 and more than one million in 2011.

=== Demopolis ===
Demopolis, another Alabama city with French roots, has held an annual Mardi Gras masquerade ball since 2008. The ball, hosted by the Marengo County Historical Society, is held at one of the city's historic mansions, Lyon Hall.

The city was founded and named by a group of French expatriates, a mix of exiled former Bonapartists and other French migrants who settled in the United States following the overthrow of the colonial government in Saint-Domingue (Haiti). The name means the People's City or City of the People. First settled in 1817, Demopolis is one of the oldest continuous settlements in the state outside of coastal Alabama.

== Arkansas ==
=== Eureka Springs ===
Eureka Gras is a celebration of Mardi Gras in the Ozark Mountain resort town of Eureka Springs, Arkansas. Begun in 2006 as a "one car parade" conducted by New Orleanian Daniel Ellis after he moved to Eureka Springs in the aftermath of Hurricane Katrina, it is now run by a so-called "Krewe of Krazo" ("Ozark" spelled in reverse) and has grown into a month-long celebration with a parade running more than an hour, multiple balls, and other events.

== California ==
=== San Diego ===
As of 2005, there is a corporate-sponsored party in the Gaslamp Quarter of downtown San Diego. In addition there is a San Diego Brazil Carnival Ball that is part of the San Diego Carnival Mardi Gras season.

=== San Luis Obispo ===
Mardi Gras celebrations in San Luis Obispo have been controversial in recent years. In 2005 leaders of this Central California city called for an end to public celebrations, as the city had become a destination for students from across the state, and celebrations had gotten out of control.

== Florida ==
=== Pensacola ===
Pensacola, Florida hosts a Mardi Gras Celebration. The Pensacola celebrations also use Moon pies in combination with beads, coins, candies & Krewe-related trades. The Pensacola festivities and the Krewes that sponsor them often are more light-hearted and family-oriented than some in other venues. The name of a few of the Krewes are puns of the names of historic Krewes in New Orleans and Mobile.

The annual Pensacola celebration, is among the oldest in the United States, dating back to 1874. Festivities typically took place on the eponymous Tuesday itself and the preceding week.

The first organized secular celebration of Carnival in Pensacola was in 1874, when a group of men including B. F. Yniestra, D. G. and F. C. Brent, D. K. Huckley and Dr. J. C. Whiting established the Knights of Priscus Association. The name Priscus came from Tarquinius Priscus, the fifth king of Rome who:

was the first Roman king to wear a purple robe, and golden crown on his head. He established the circus or place where games could be held, also increased the number of Roman knights, and built a stone wall around the city. His majesty of our carnival, like his prototype of old Rome, knows that "A little folly now and then / Is relished by the best of men."

The event became unorganized, having "fallen entirely into the hands of individual merry-makers and frolickers who disported themselves as their own wild merriment dictated," but was reorganized by the Clerks Union in 1900. They formed the Pensacola Carnival Association with a 12-person committee led by chairman J. I. Johnson. Priscus remained the title of the festival's ceremonial king, and Alexander Clement Blount II was named the first King Priscus of the new group.

Pensacola's first ladies mystic society, the "Pompadour Mystic Society" (the Pompadours), held its first annual Mystic Ball at the Armory Hall on February 19, 1909, crowning Dudley Thornton as King. The "Revellers of Ariola", Pensacola's first male mystic society, was organized in 1909 and held its first Tableau Ball at the K of C Hall on January 28, 1910, crowning Miss Cornelia Bass as Queen of Ariola. In 1936, the female krewe "Merry Markers" held its first ball in 1936. With the exception of the Pompadours, these founding Carnival Season organizations remain active in Pensacola's celebrations to this day.

In 1954 the Krewe of LaFitte was founded as a parading organization participating in the community wide annual Fiesta of Five Flags celebration; however, it now parades and holds Balls during Fiesta and Mardi Gras seasons.

The public celebration is currently organized by Pensacola Mardi Gras, Inc., with krewes parading and/or holding balls during the weekends prior to Fat Tuesday.

Parades are on Friday night ("Krewe of Lafitte"), Saturday afternoon (the "Grand Parade"), and the "Krewe of Wrecks" parade on Pensacola Beach on Sunday. No parades are held on Mardi Gras, itself. Many small krewes parade in individual floats or on foot during the Grand and Krewe of Wrecks Parades.

Older krewes holding Carnival balls but do not parade, include the Rebellaires (1947), Pierrettes, Mystic Maids sand Marionettes. Parading krewes include: Mystic Mafia, Krewe of African Kings, Krewe of African Queens, Krewe of Andres de Pez, Krewe of Aphrodite, Krewe of Avant Garde, Krewe of Brewe, Krewe of Hip Huggers, Krewe of Jesters, Mayoki Indians, Krewe of Nauga, Krewe of Seville, Krewe of the Silver Slipper, Krewe of Warriors, Mystic Krewe of Nereids, Krewe du YaYas, Order of Odin and Krewe of Gatsby Girls.

Mardi Gras parades and celebrations are also celebrated throughout other communities in the Pensacola Bay Area, including Navarre, Milton, and Pensacola Beach. These parades are hosted by local krewes. For Navarre, Milton, and Pensacola Beach, those krewes are the Krewe of Jesters, Krewe of Airship Pirates, and Krewe of Wrecks, respectively.

=== Hollywood ===
Hollywood, Florida hosts Mardi Gras festivities in the downtown area and a Fat Tuesday celebration on Hollywood Beach Broadwalk with live entertainment and Creole food. Fiesta Tropicale emerged from a Hollywood tradition that started in 1935 as Fiesta of the Nations, a celebration of different cultures featuring performances by costumed children at Hollywood Central School. In 1997, a core group of Hollywood residents re-established the Mardi Gras celebration as Fiesta Tropicale of Hollywood, Inc. where krewes built floats and second lined through the downtown business district.

=== Orlando ===
In Orlando, the Universal Studios Florida theme park hosts an annual Mardi Gras celebration. This event features concerts by top musical acts, a Mardi Gras parade, and more. The event takes place over multiple weekends from February to April at the park, and is included with the regular daily admission to the park.

== Louisiana ==
=== New Orleans ===
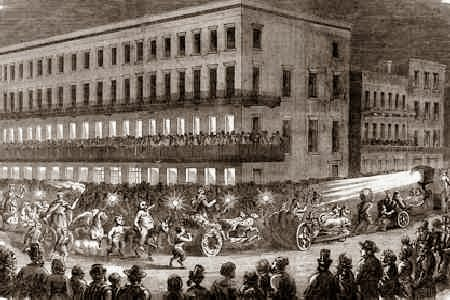
Engraving of a Mistick Krewe of Comus night parade during the Mardi Gras season in 1858

New Orleans Mardi Gras celebrations draw hundreds of thousands of tourists to the city to mingle with the locals at the famed parties and parades. As many as a half-million spectators have been estimated by officials to line the route of major parades. The first Mardi Gras festivities in Louisiana were held on March 3, 1699. On that day, a group of French explorers set up camp on the west bank of the Mississippi River, about 60 miles downriver from what is now New Orleans. The group's leader, Pierre Baptiste Le Moyne, Sieur d'Iberville dubbed the spot La Pointe du Mardi Gras. Three hundred years later, the Rex organization put a marker at the site.

An account from 1743 notes that the custom of holding Carnival balls was established by that date, during the time when Bienville was governor. On Mardi Gras, there were masques and processions in the streets of the city, although they were, at times, prohibited by law. The celebrations were quickly resumed whenever restrictions were lifted or the enforcement of them was lax. In 1833, Bernard de Marigny, a wealthy French Creole plantation owner, raised the money to fund an official Mardi Gras celebration, a parade followed by tableau and ball.

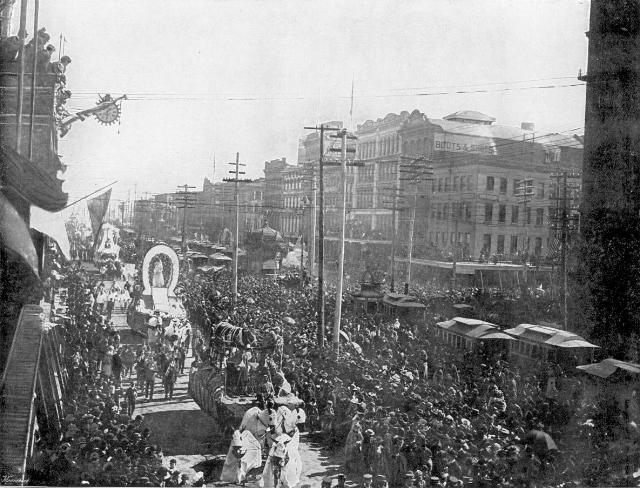
Mardi Gras parade on Canal Street during the early 1890s

Building on Marigny's 1833 festivities in 1857 a group of Anglo-Americans, some from Mobile mystic societies founded The Mistick Krewe of Comus. Comus while no longer parading, still hosts the oldest continuous Tableau and Ball. It originated a number of traditions that continue today (such as the use of floats in parades) and is considered the first Carnival krewe in the modern sense of the term. Next, the Twelfth Night Revelers were formed in 1870 to celebrate Epiphany, the official start of the Carnival Season.

In 1875, the state of Louisiana declared Mardi Gras a legal holiday. Economic, political, and weather conditions sometimes led to the cancellation of some or all of the major parades, especially during the American Civil War, World War I and World War II, but Carnival has always been observed in the city in some way.

The last large parades went through the narrow streets of the city's old French Quarter neighborhood in 1972. Larger floats and crowds and safety concerns led the city government to prohibit big parades in the Quarter.

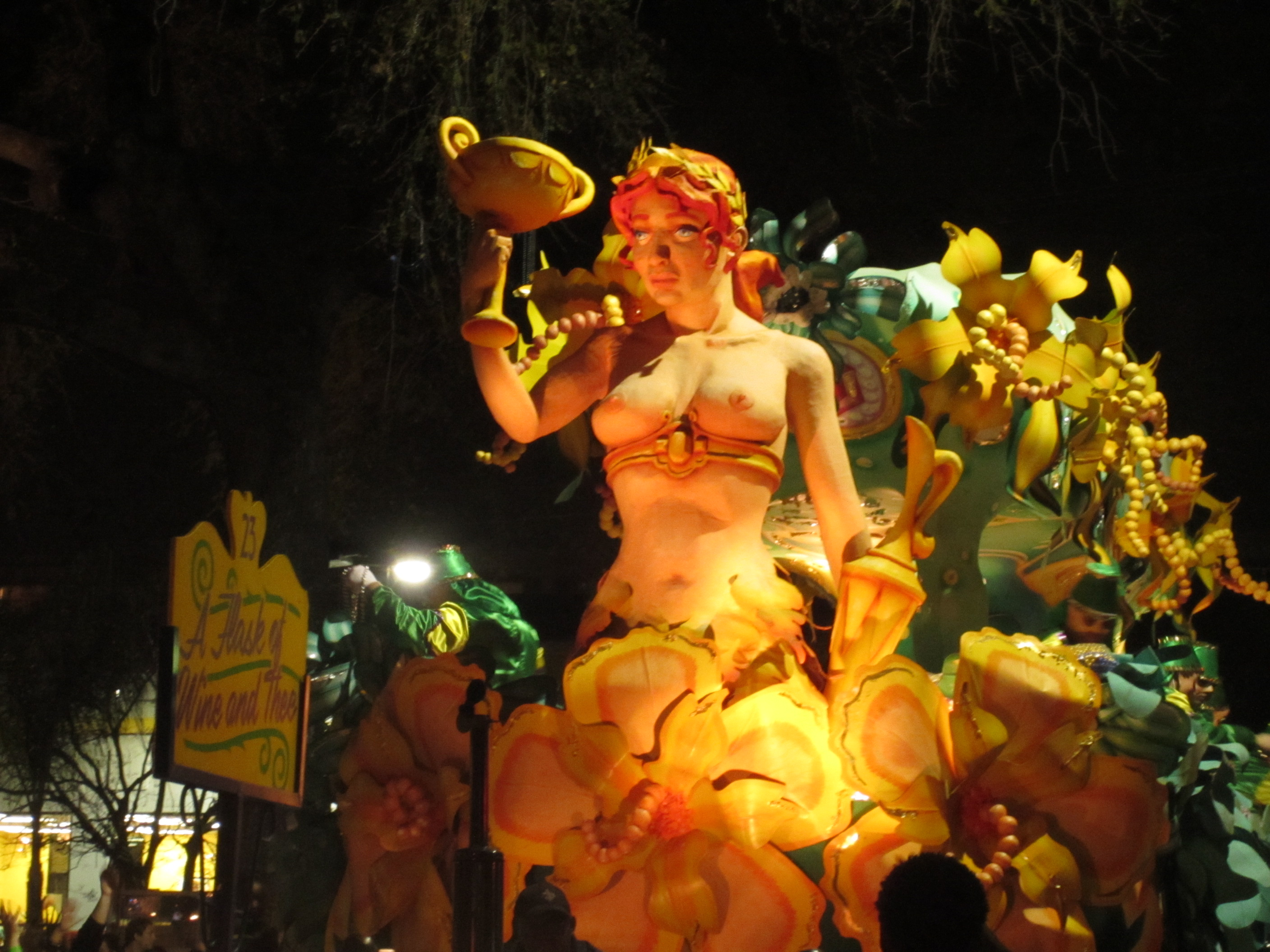
A night parade on St. Charles Avenue during the 2012 Mardi Gras season

In 1991, the New Orleans city council passed an ordinance that required social organizations, including Mardi Gras Krewes, to certify publicly that they did not discriminate on the basis of race, religion, gender or sexual orientation, to obtain parade permits and other public licenses. The ordinance required these and other private social groups to abandon their traditional code of secrecy and identify their members for the city's Human Relations Commission. In protest, the 19th century krewes Comus and Momus stopped parading. Proteus did parade in the 1992 Carnival season, but returned to the parade schedule in 2000. Two federal courts later declared that the ordinance was an unconstitutional infringement on First Amendment rights of free association, and an unwarranted intrusion on the privacy of the groups subject to the ordinance. The Supreme Court refused to hear the city's appeal of their decision. Today, many krewes operate under a business structure – membership is open to anyone who pays dues to have a place on a parade float.

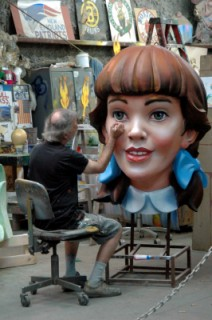
Float-making in New Orleans

The effect of Hurricane Katrina on New Orleans in late 2005 caused a few people to question the future of the city's Mardi Gras celebrations. The city government, essentially bankrupt after the storm, pushed for a massively scaled back celebration to limit strains on city services. However, many krewes insisted that they wanted to and would be ready to parade, so negotiations between krewe leaders and city officials resulted in a compromise schedule, scaled back but less severely than originally suggested. The 2006 New Orleans' Carnival schedule included the Krewe du Vieux on its traditional route through Marigny and the French Quarter on February 11, then several parades on Saturday, the 18th, and Sunday the 19th, followed by six days of parades starting Thursday night, the 23rd, until Mardi Gras Day, the 28th. Other than Krewe du Vieux and two Westbank parades that went through Algiers, all New Orleans parades were restricted to the Saint Charles Avenue Uptown to Canal Street route, a section of the city which escaped significant flooding. Restrictions were placed on the amount of time parades could be on the street and how late they could go.

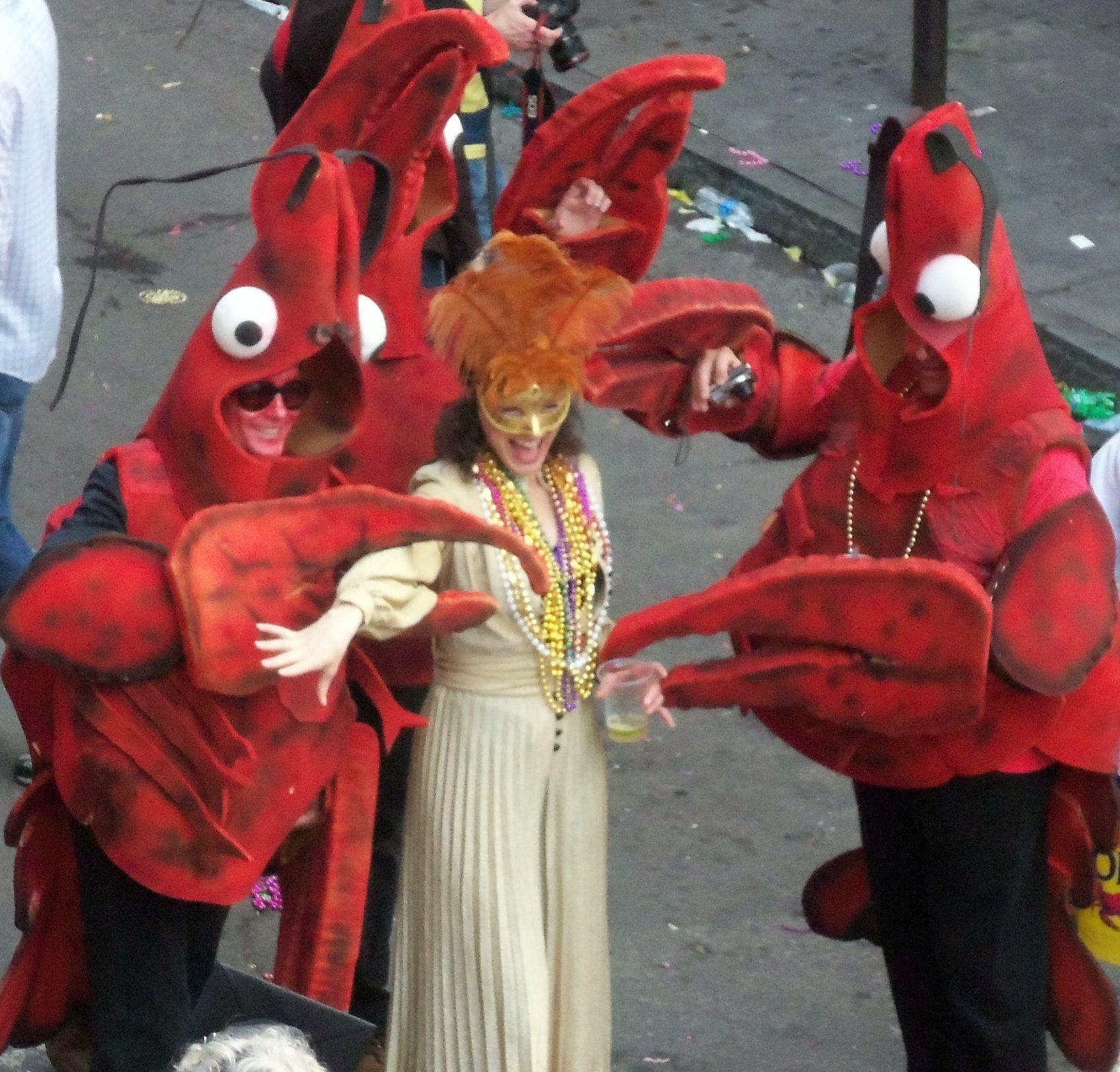
Costumed revelers during the 2011 Mardi Gras season

Louisiana State troopers and National Guard assisted with crowd control for the first time since 1979. Many of the floats had been partially submerged in the floodwaters for weeks. While some krewes repaired and removed all traces of these effects, others incorporated flood lines and other damage into the designs of the floats. Most of the locals who worked on the floats and rode on them were significantly impacted by the storm, and many had lost most or all of their possessions, but their enthusiasm for Carnival was even more intense than usual and celebrated as an affirmation of life. The themes of many costumes and floats had more barbed satire than usual, with commentary on the trials and tribulations of living in the devastated city, with references to MREs, Katrina refrigerators and FEMA trailers, along with much mocking of the Federal Emergency Management Agency (FEMA), and local and national politicians.

It is impossible to estimate how synonymous Mardi Gras and New Orleans have become in popular culture. In 1926, Ferde Grofe wrote an orchestral cycle called the Mississippi Suite, the last movement featuring a musical depiction of Mardi Gras in the French Quarter. Since then the influence of Fat Tuesday on American culture has only increased, as evidenced by the wealth of songs, films, and television shows about the notorious festival.

=== Alexandria ===
Alexandria, which is located in the heart of Central Louisiana (CenLa), enjoys a blend of Mardi Gras traditions in keeping with the area's reputation as the "cultural crossroads" of the state. In addition to Mardi Gras balls, parties, and other functions, it hosts several parades, including the Alexandria Mardi Gras Association (AMGA) Krewe Parade, traditionally on the Sunday before Mardi Gras, a Children's parade, and the "Krewe of Provine" Parade, usually held on Mardi Gras Day. In 2008, the "College Cheerleaders and Classic Cars" parade made its debut with warm reception. The area's parades are known for their mix of traditional Mardi Gras fun and revelry with a family-friendly environment. They attract people from as far away as Texas and Mississippi.

=== Baton Rouge ===
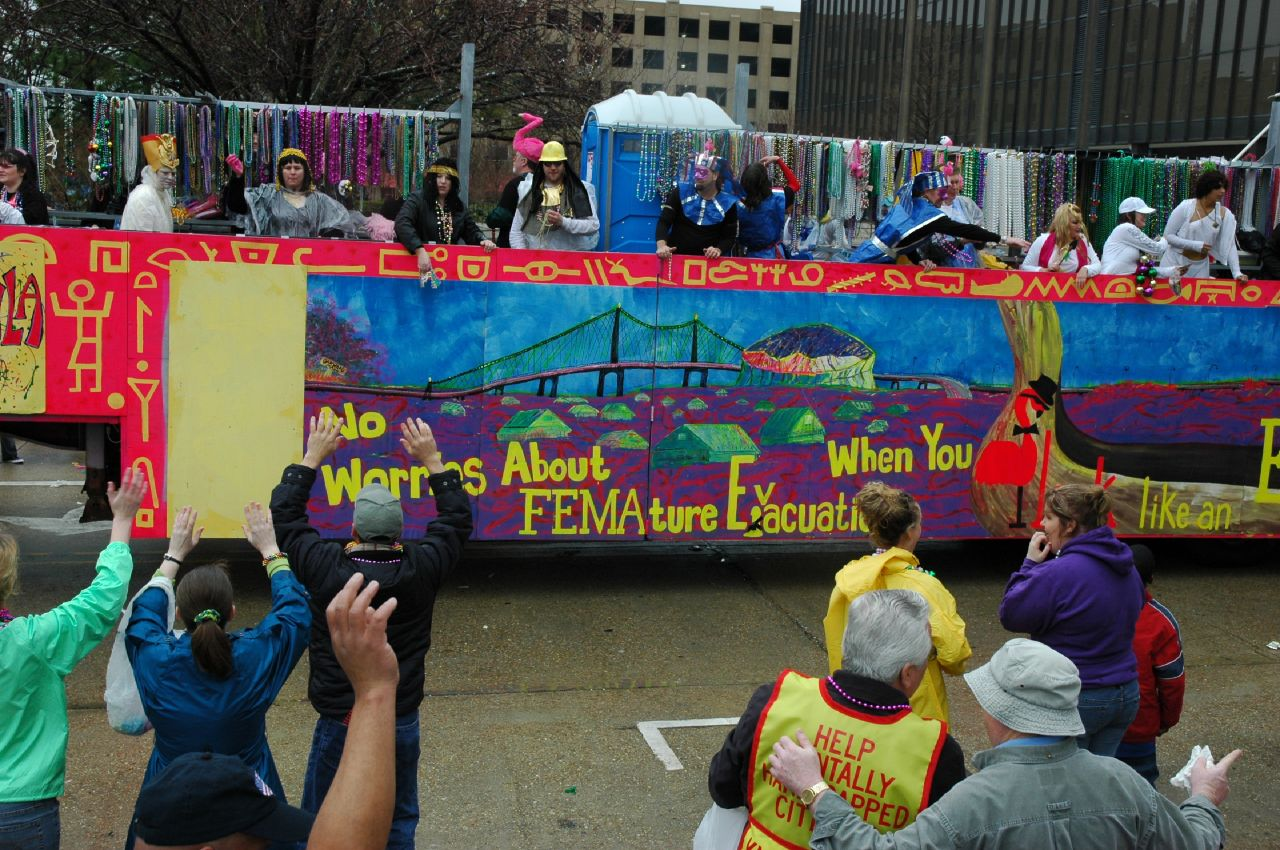
Mardi Gras in Baton Rouge, 2006

Baton Rouge hosts eight parades, including the Spanish Town Parade, Krewe of Southdowns, Krewe of Mutts (dog parade), Krewe Mystique, and Parades such as the Krewe of Orion, Krewe of Artemis, Krewe of Jupiter, and Krewe of Poseidon(new for 2010) which offer more of a traditional New Orleans-style parade. All parades take place downtown, with the exception of the annual Southdowns parade, which runs through the Southdowns subdivision just south of Downtown.

=== Houma ===
Houma hosts a significant Mardi Gras celebration of ten parades, two of which roll on Mardi Gras day, and the others on the two weekends preceding the big day. King Houmas rules on Fat Tuesday itself. Law enforcement officials estimated that in 2008, more than 150,000 people lined the route of his parade. Mardi Gras has been celebrated annually in Houma since 1947. "Krewe of Hercules", "Krewe of Aquarius", "Krewe of Hyacinthians", "Krewe of Titans", "Krewe of Aphrodite", "Krewe of Mardi Gras", "Krewe of Terreanians", "Krewe of Cleopatra", "Krewe of Houmas", and the "Krewe of Kajuns" make up the ten parades. Houma is about 60 miles southwest of New Orleans.

=== Lafayette ===
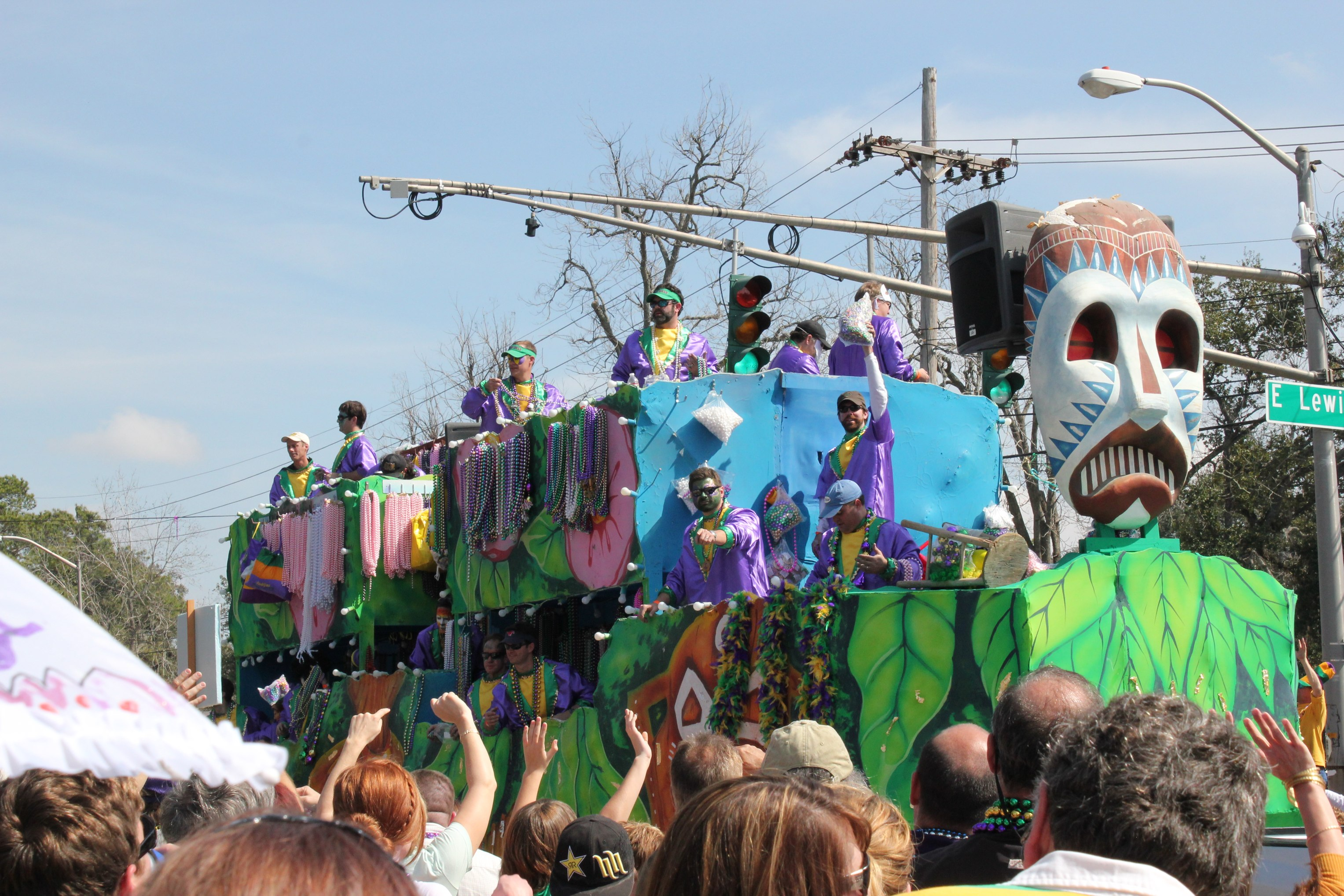
Mardi Gras parade in Lafayette

Lafayette is home to the state's second largest Mardi Gras celebration, which includes eight parades of floats and bands during the Carnival season. The first parade, ten days before Mardi Gras, is the celebrity-led "Krewe of Carnivale en Rio Parada", featuring over 600 riders. Parade royalty on Fat Tuesday includes King Gabriel and Queen Evangeline, named for the hero and heroine of Henry Wadsworth Longfellow's epic poem; and King Toussaint L'Ouverture and Queen Suzanne Simonet, named for the great Haitian historical leaders. Mardi Gras parades have been an annual tradition in Lafayette since 1934. Recent attendance on Mardi Gras day has been estimated as high as 250,000 by police spokespersons. The first formal Mardi Gras ball and parade in Lafayette dates back to 1869.

In 1897, King Attakapas, the first Lafayette Mardi Gras king was crowned. He rode into town on a Southern Pacific train decorated to look like a royal throne and led the parade. After 1897, formal Mardi Gras parades and balls seemed to come and go until 1934 when the Southwest Louisiana Mardi Gras association was formed by representatives from civic and service organizations to ensure that Lafayette would always have a Mardi Gras celebration.

=== Lake Charles ===
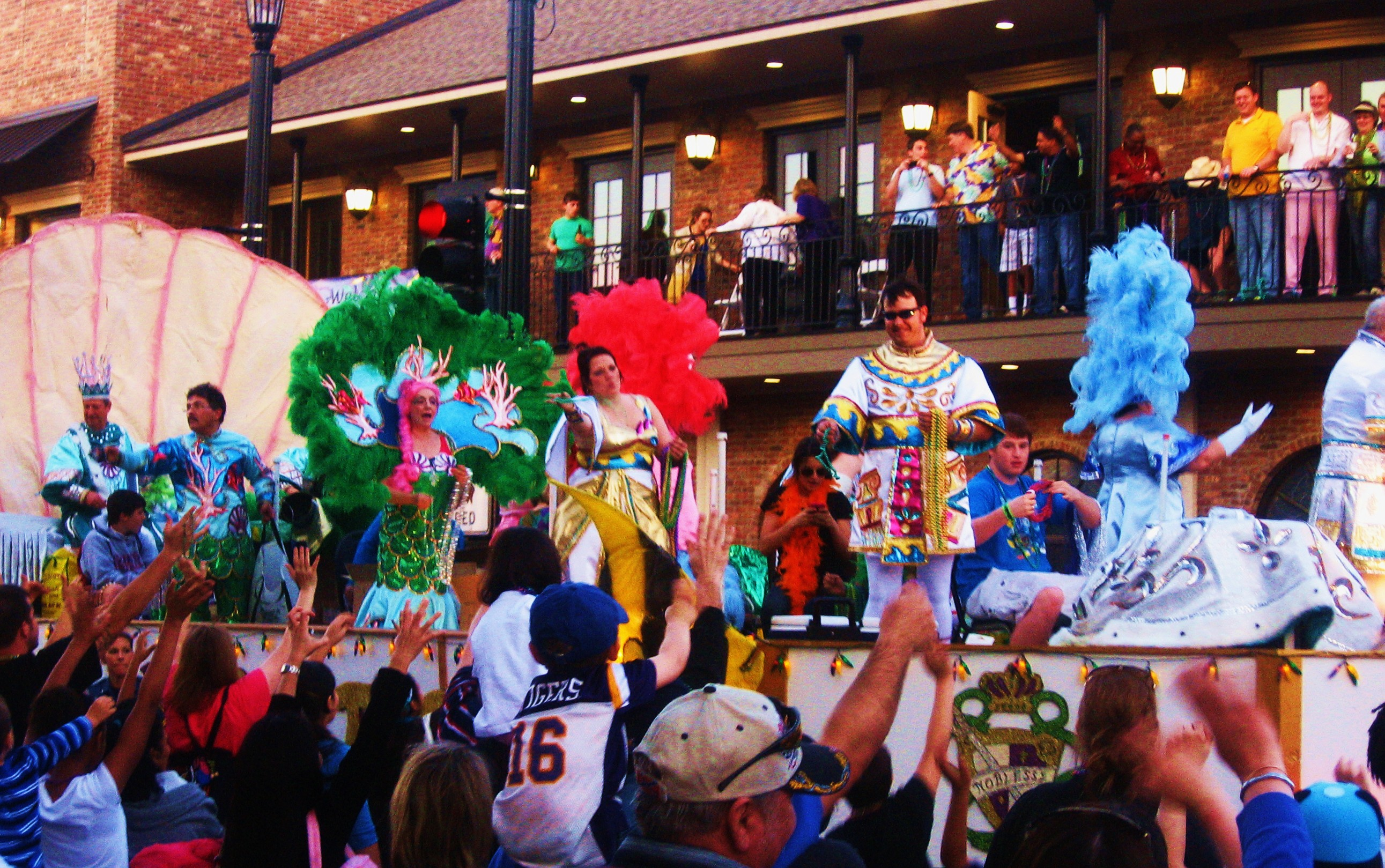
Mardi Gras in Lake Charles

Lake Charles hosts a family-friendly Mardi Gras celebration with nine parades. With over 50 krewes, it is second only to New Orleans in the number of krewes in Louisiana. The Lake Charles Mardi Gras celebration is unique in that it is the only place in Louisiana where the public is invited to see the costumes of all the krewes in one place, at the Lake Charles Civic Center. Mardi Gras began in Lake Charles as early as 1882 when King Momus landed on the lakefront to begin the celebration. With the onset of the World Wars, Mardi Gras in Lake Charles was not celebrated as much, but was revived in the latter part of the century. This celebration begins in Lake Charles on January 6 each year. The last parade is the Krewe of Krewes Parade in downtown Lake Charles. Mardi Gras in Lake Charles regularly draws 150,000 people. In addition, Mardi Gras can be enjoyed in Lake Charles year round at the Mardi Gras Museum of Imperial Calcasieu, which features elaborate costumes and an interactive float. This museum houses the world's largest collection of Mardi Gras costumes.

=== New Roads ===
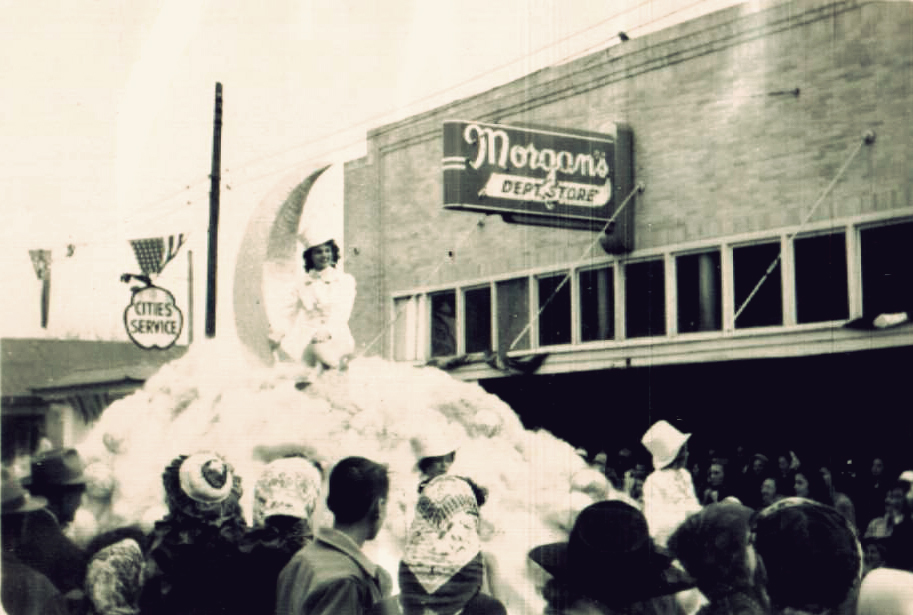
Mardi Gras parade in New Roads, 1949

New Roads another Mardi Gras celebration outside New Orleans. The family-friendly celebration has been an annual event since 1922 and includes two parades on Fat Tuesday: the Community Center Carnival parade, one of the nation's oldest African-American sponsored events, which rolls in the morning; and the New Roads Lions Carnival parade, the first-known Mardi Gras parade to be staged as a charitable fundraiser, which rolls in the afternoon.

Each parade consists of as many as 35 floats built fresh each year, and 10 marching bands and drill units. Unlike the exclusivity of krewe parades in New Orleans and other cities, New Roads' parades are open to public participation, with local schools, churches, organizations, businesses and families building, entering and riding the floats. New Roads' proximity to the Baton Rouge metropolitan area results in an unusually large number of visitors to the New Roads parades, the town's normal size considering. Law enforcement officials have estimated New Roads parade attendance as high as 100,000 in years marked by favorable weather.

=== Shreveport ===
Shreveport, located in the Northwestern corner of the state, has numerous krewes, including several that do not parade. Some of them include Atlas, Sobek, Harambee, Centaur, Gemini, Highland, and Oceanus. Thousands of people come to Shreveport to see the parades each year. History has it that Shreveport was said to have had Mardi Gras parades beginning after the Civil War. However, the Great Depression ended the celebration for years. In 1989 the parade tradition was renewed by the Krewe of Gemini parade. The Krewe of Centaur currently maintains the largest membership with well over 700 members.

=== Courir de Mardi Gras ===
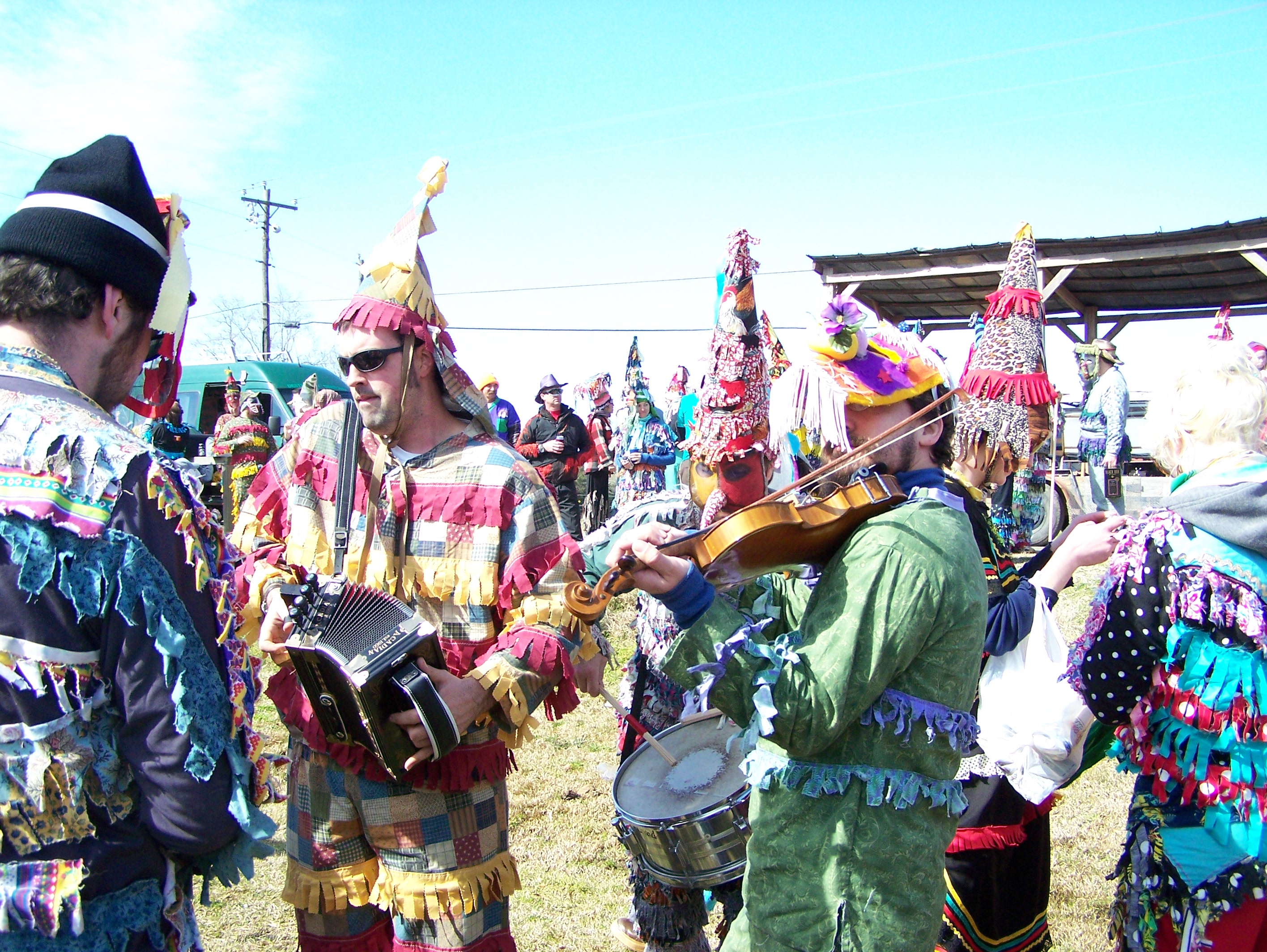
Courir de Mardi Gras (Mardi Gras run) participants playing music

In parts of Cajun country, such as Eunice, Basile, Church Point and Mamou, the traditional Courir de Mardi Gras (French for the "Mardi Gras Run") is still held. Le Capitaine leads masked men on horseback to gather ingredients for making the communal meal (usually a gumbo). Participants gather in costume and move from home to home requesting ingredients for the night's meal. This rural Mardi Gras draws on traditions that are centuries old. Revelers sing "La Chanson de Mardi Gras", a song echoing medieval melodies.

People escape from ordinary life partly through the alcohol many consume, and through the roles they portray in costume. As they act out their parts, they are escaping from routine existence, freed from the restraints that confine them every other day of the year.

The capitaine maintains control over the Mardi Gras. He issues instructions to the riders as they assemble early in the morning and then leads them on their run. When they arrive at a farm house, he obtains permission to enter private property, after which the riders may charge toward the house, where they sing, dance, and beg until the owner offers them an ingredient for a gumbo. Often, the owner will throw a live chicken into the air that the maskers will chase, like football players trying to recover a fumble. By mid to late afternoon, the courir returns to town and parades down the main street on the way to the location where the evening gumbo will be prepared.

=== Other Louisiana cities ===
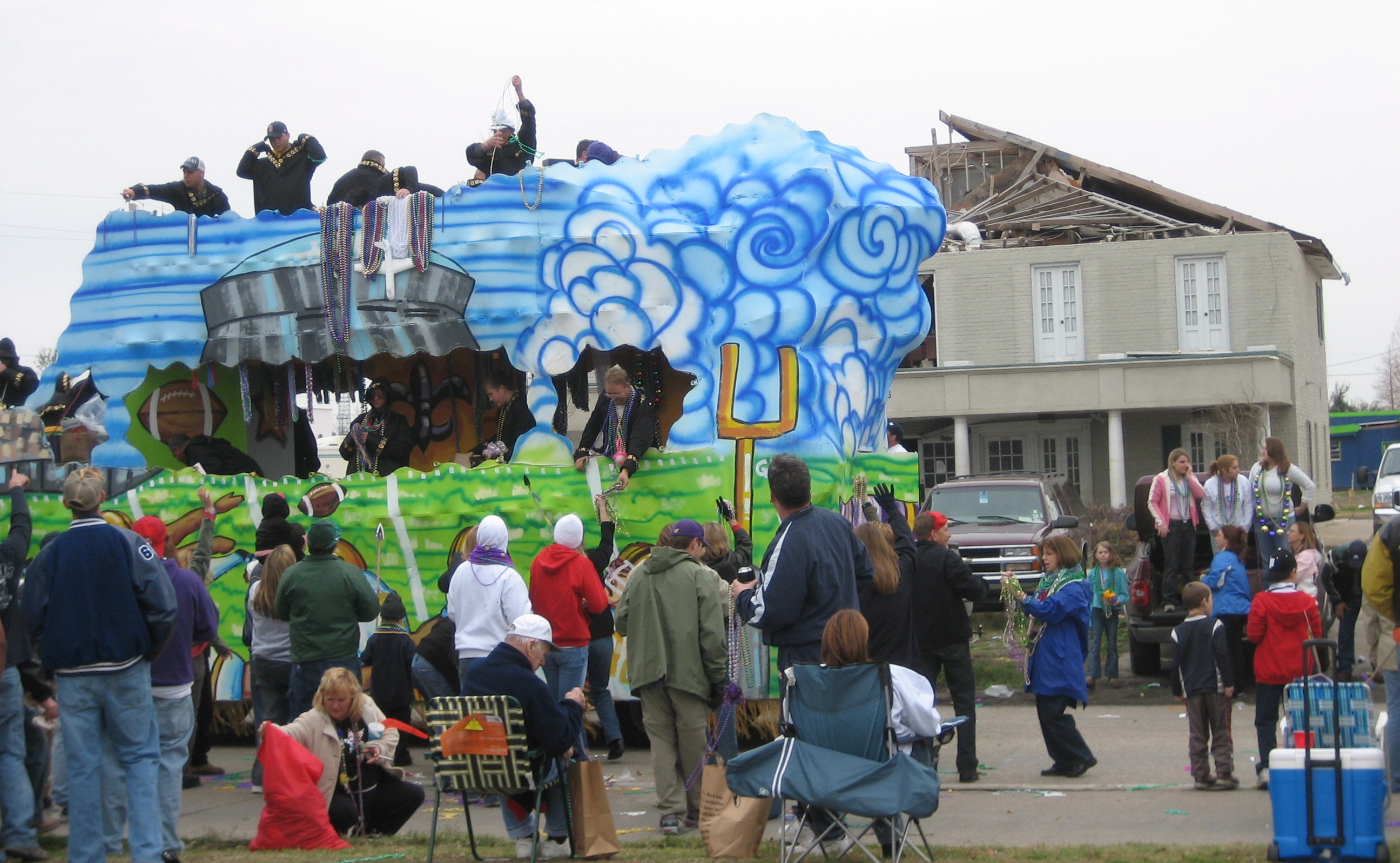
The "Knights of Nemesis" parade rolled through Chalmette in 2006 despite the devastation of Hurricane Katrina.

Other Louisiana cities holding Mardi Gras parades include Bogalusa, Bush, Chalmette, Columbia, Covington, Gretna, Kaplan, La Place, Madisonville, Mandeville, Maringouin, Metairie, Minden, Monroe, Natchitoches, Pearl River, Slidell, Springhill, and Thibodaux.

Because of violent activities of the American terrorist group, the Ku Klux Klan, Louisiana has a state law prohibiting the wearing of hoods and masks in public. Mardi Gras is one of the occasions when exceptions are allowed, as are Halloween celebrations and religious observance.

== Michigan ==
=== Detroit ===
Michigan's first Catholic settlers were French. The Fat Tuesday celebrations of modern times in Detroit stem from the more recent influence of the Polish Paczki Day.

== Mississippi ==
=== Coastal Mississippi ===
Coastal Mississippi and its 12 communities within the three coastal counties of Mississippi (Hancock, Harrison and Jackson) celebrates Mardi Gras and the carnival season, with parades, balls, and events across the region.

=== Central Mississippi ===
Vicksburg, located along the Mississippi River in central Mississippi, holds an annual Mardi Gras parade, along with a Mardi Gras ball.

== Missouri ==
=== St. Louis ===
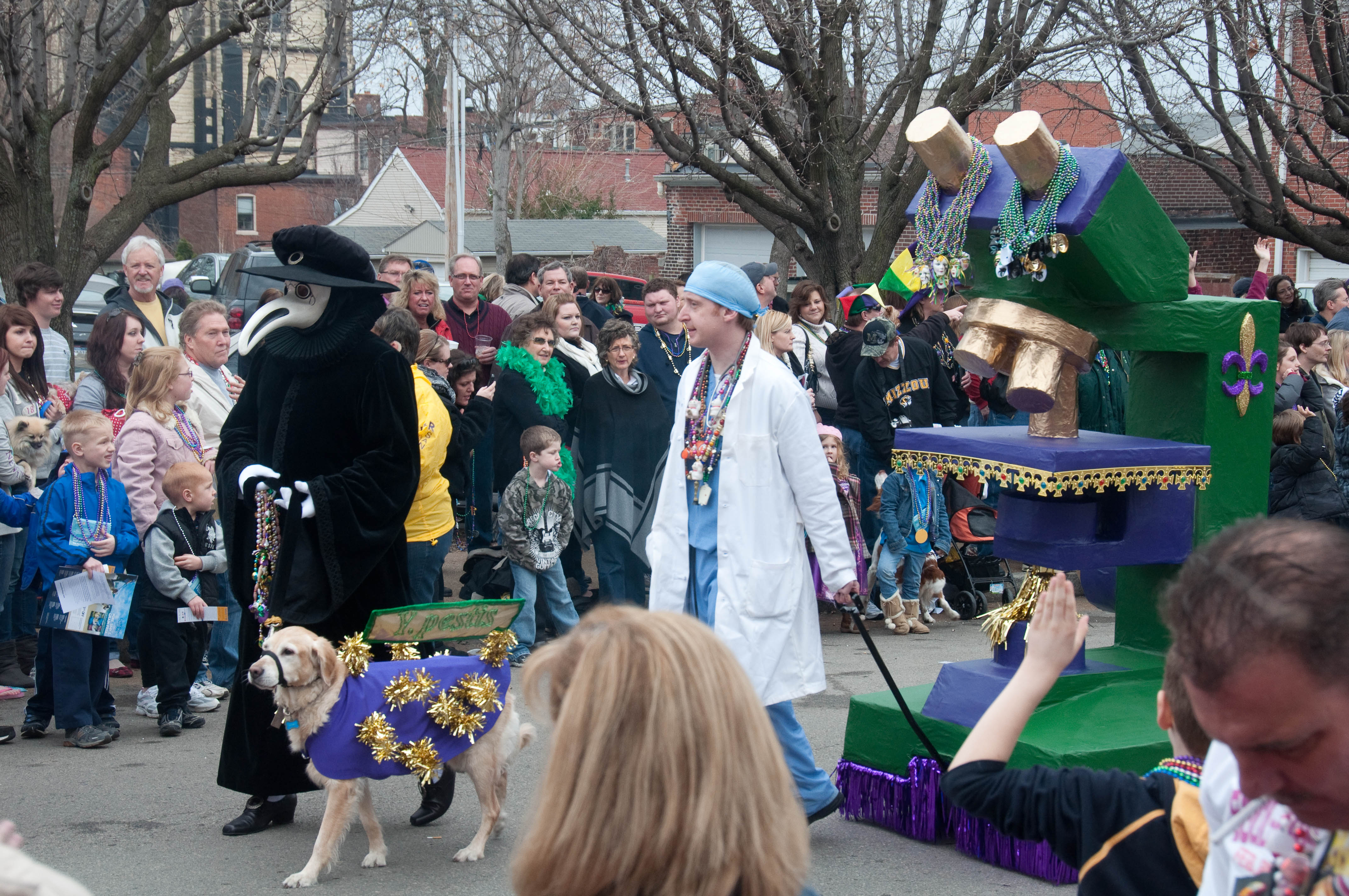
Mardi Gras in St. Louis, 2011

Although founded by French settlers in 1764 the city has not had a significant French Catholic population since the late 19th century. The St. Louis Mardi Gras was revived in the early 1980s by bored, drunk patrons of Hilary's bar in the Soulard neighborhood adjacent to downtown, when they decided to march to another neighboring bar. Over the years, what started as a private party has grown in size and scale, and has attracted major corporate sponsorship, On the second Saturday before Mardi Gras, there is a family-oriented "Krewe of Barkus" pet parade with corporate sponsorship by Beggin' Strips. Participants consist of anyone who dresses up their pet in costume, and walks their pet along the parade route. The parade is followed by the informal Wiener dog races. Then, on the Saturday before Fat Tuesday, the more adult-oriented, flesh-for-beads parade occurs, although there have been various attempts to reserve a family section at one end of the route. People from all over storm the streets with beers and bead necklaces after the Saturday parade. The streets of Soulard, Geyer, Allen, Russell, Ann, Shenandoah, and others are crowded with people from 7th to 12th Street. The Fat Tuesday parade occurs in the evening. In recent years it has been moved from just north of Soulard to downtown St. Louis. The majority of the overall Mardi Gras festivities have corporate sponsorship, primarily from Anheuser-Busch and Southern Comfort. In 2006, this led to an investigation by the Alcohol and Tobacco Tax and Trade Bureau and the Missouri Division of Alcohol and Tobacco Control into the legality of Mardi Gras Inc.'s sponsorship deals.

== Oklahoma ==
=== Tulsa ===
In 2010, Tulsa began holding an annual Mardi Gras parade through its downtown Blue Dome District.

== Oregon ==
=== Portland ===
In 2010, a group of Louisiana expatriates and friends founded the Mysti Krewe of Nimbus to bring Mardi Gras and Louisiana culture to the Pacific Northwest and Portland in particular. Lacking in any formal Mardi Gras festivities, the Krewe held the first Portland Mardi Gras Ball the Saturday before Mardi Gras. The Ball is now in its fourth year. Krewe activities have grown to include a Mardi Gras Day parade on Mississippi Avenue, a float entry in the annual Rose Festival Starlight Parade and second line parades at the Safeway Waterfront Blues Festival.

== Texas ==
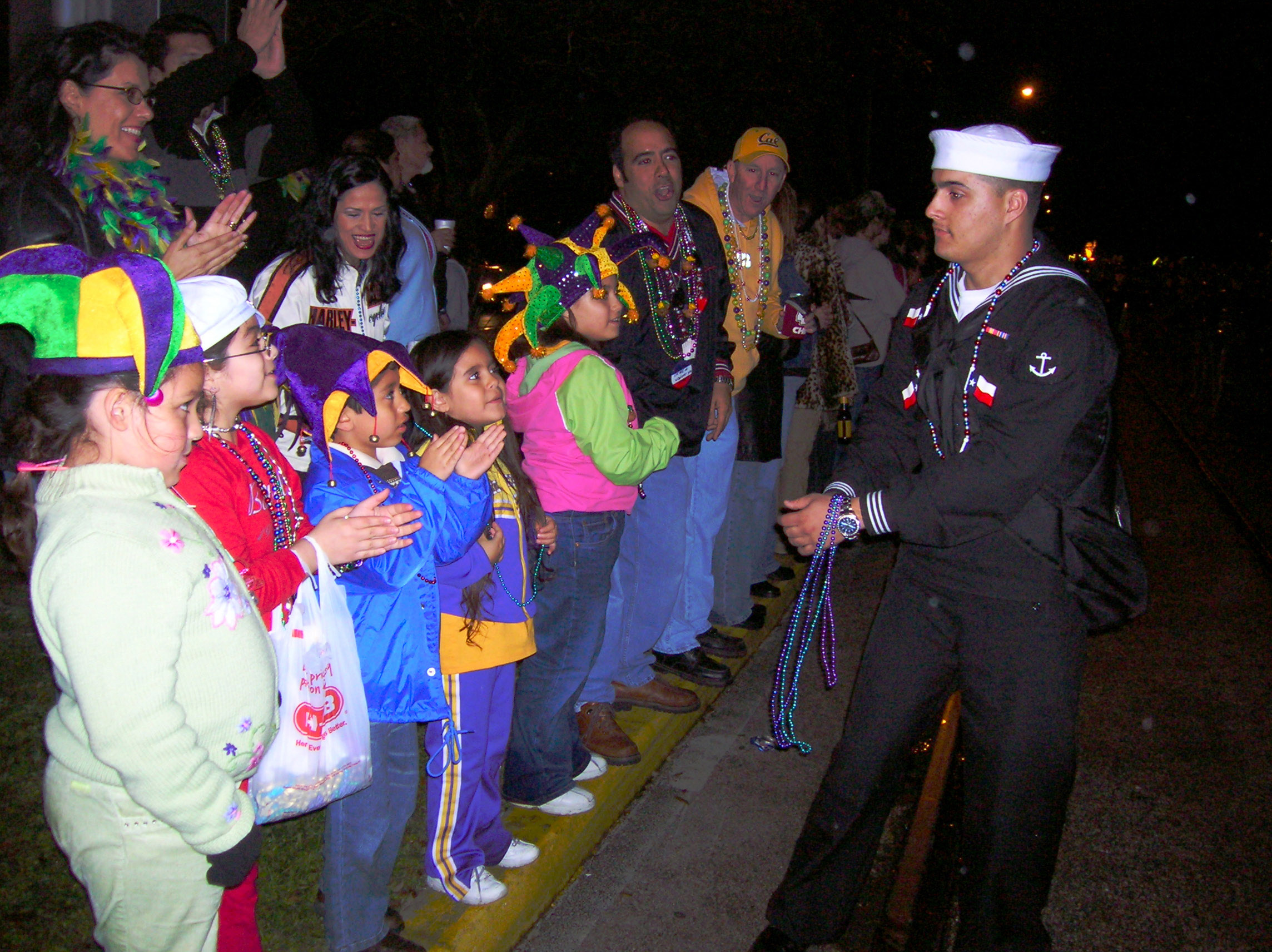
Mardi Gras in Galveston

=== Galveston ===
Galveston, Texas is home to the largest Mardi Gras festival in Texas, which attracts up to 200,000 revelers to the island each year. The celebration in Galveston dates back 1867, when it consisted of merely a masked ball and a theatre performance of Shakespeare's "King Henry IV." The emergence of rival Krewes the "Knights of Momus" and the "Knights of Myth" led to the first extravagant Mardi Gras celebration in 1871. The island tradition now includes many night parades, masked balls and exquisite costumes. The current Mardi Gras was revived in 1985 by George P. Mitchell; unlike its New Orleans counterparts, there are no celebrations held on the Monday prior to Fat Tuesday. Since 1987, the Galveston Park Board has managed the event despite its struggles and successes.

Prior to Hurricane Ike, promoters from the Galveston Park Board usually charge admission fees on the first weekend during Mardi Gras season kickoff events within the Strand Entertainment District (bounded by 25th Street, Harborside Drive, 20th Street, and Market Street/Avenue D). Parades on Seawall Boulevard are free to the general public. Around 2007, the Park Board slashed $800,000 in their budget due to deficits, and decided to drop the admission fee for the 2008 season and forgo live music performances.

After Ike's devastation of Galveston Island, there was no admission charge in 2009 and 2010; it was believed at the time that "Mardi Gras! Galveston" was becoming like its New Orleans counterpart, where no admission fees are imposed. An editorial by the Galveston County Daily News in 2007 suggested that Mardi Gras should be operated like "Dickens on the Strand" as a manageable event under a nonprofit like the Galveston Historical Foundation similar to the Port Arthur, TX Mardi Gras (produced by Mardi Gras of Southeast Texas, Inc). Around April 2010, Galveston businessman Mike Dean, who runs Yaga's Entertainment, Inc. (the producer of the annual Galveston Food and Wine Festival and Chili Quest Festival), entered into a bidding process to become the new Mardi Gras promoter from 2011 to 2015 under a five-year contract, made official on November 18, 2010, as voted on by members of the Galveston City Council. The admission fee has returned – which now includes both weekends prior to Fat Tuesday despite the hiring of 30 security officers to augment local law enforcement. Statistics from the Galveston Convention and Visitor's Bureau have stated that with the admission fees for both weekends, crime has dropped 50% and Galveston Police Chief Charles Wiley (prior to his 2012 retirement) is backing the admission fee despite opposition from Downtown Galveston businesses on The Strand and Mechanic Street.

Revelers and vendors who usually frequent Mardi Gras on Galveston Island have concerns that the admission fee will bring fewer attendees along with financial uncertainty when the Park Board sold admission tickets prior to the 2008 season. The March 5, 2011, Knights of Momus Parade attracted 20,000 revelers within the Strand while the crowd estimate during the entire Mardi Gras season is 250,000. Vendors and Downtown Galveston businesses have reported a drop in their sales despite the promoter bringing more live music, parades, and added security which includes metal detectors and bag checks. As a downside, Yaga's Entertainment Inc. incorporated the rules and regulations modeled on Mardi Gras DFW – including a prohibition on professional video and still camera equipment within the Strand Entertainment District because of the production of live entertainment from national touring or band acts. Ticket sales for the first weekend of the 2012 season dropped to 30% during the first weekend despite the numerous complaints vented at Yaga's Entertainment, Inc. – Dean stated that the admission charge will remain indefinitely until the existing 5-year contract with the City of Galveston is up for renewal. Admission pricing at the entry gates averaged $17 where discounted $8 tickets were available from the Yaga's Entertainment Inc. website (www.YagasPresents.com). Decreased ticket revenue was also attributed to the cold temperatures and high winds on the first weekend, and heavy precipitation on the second weekend – changes for the 2013 season would include contingency planning where events can be rescheduled by time shifts.

As of January 2013, the $17 admission fee is still imposed by Yaga's Entertainment – one Strand business, Crow's Southwest Cantina, has circulated a petition since Dean is allegedly profiteering but has stated that a free Mardi Gras is unsustainable. Houston TV station KTRK has stated that Mardi Gras! Galveston is becoming too expensive where local merchants are losing out just to pay to be on a public street. Galveston Convention Center and Visitor Bureau chair Leah Cast stated on FOX 26 Houston that charging the admission fees brings in a quality event inclusive of Grammy-nominated musicians and balcony parties. A few Strand-area businesses claim that the admission fee keeps out the undesirable elements – during the February 9, 2013, festivities in the Strand Entertainment District, seven revelers who refused to leave the entertainment district were arrested by the Galveston Police Department during the street sweep where the police clear The Strand of all revelers. Angry revelers threw beer bottles, trash cans, and barricade fencing at the police where video footage were posted on YouTube. Over a year later during the March 1, 2014, Mardi Gras weekend, the same incident was repeated but Galveston Police officers fired tear gas at 19 partygoers who refused to comply with the police order to disperse.

In January 2015, the City of Galveston issued a Request for Qualifications concerning the future promoter of the Strand Entertainment District where the same criteria proposed for the 2011–15 contract will remain the same (live entertainment from national touring acts limited to recording artists, bands, along with paid admission (on Fridays and Saturdays prior to Fat Tuesday with free admission on Sundays – this was amended during the latter part of the previous 2011–15 contract) and gated checkpoints/bag checks (which is stipulated under the new contract in the wake of the Boston Marathon bombing) but the contract (which lasted five years without a contract extension) is limited to 3 years where the City of Galveston can reserve the right to extend the contract for an additional two years. Some Strand businessowners who voiced their displeasure with Yaga's Entertainment would rather have the Strand Entertainment District managed like the Lone Star Rally since they do not set up gated checkpoints – their touring acts (live music) are usually performed at 2 stages.

=== Port Arthur ===
Port Arthur began celebrating Mardi Gras in 1993.

=== Dallas ===
Dallas, Texas is home to a Mardi Gras celebration, MystiQal.

== Wisconsin ==
=== La Crosse ===
La Crosse has held a Mardi Gras celebration from 1991 to 2020 & since 2022. Originally the celebration and its fund-raising efforts were used to provide assistance for Catholic school tuition within the Coulee Catholic Schools system. Now, in addition to the Coulee Catholic Schools, the event provides funding to the Boy Scouts of America, Girl Scouts of the USA, the Boys & Girls Clubs, and the YMCA. The La Crosse Mardi Gras includes a formal costume ball and a family and community festival.

== See also ==
- Caribbean Carnival#United States
