= Drum line =

Drum line may refer to:

- Drum line (shark control), an anti-shark precautionary measure
- Drumline, a formation for a section of percussion instruments
- Drumline (film), a 2002 film

== See also ==
- Drum (disambiguation)
