= 1st Armored Car Squadron (United States Marines) =

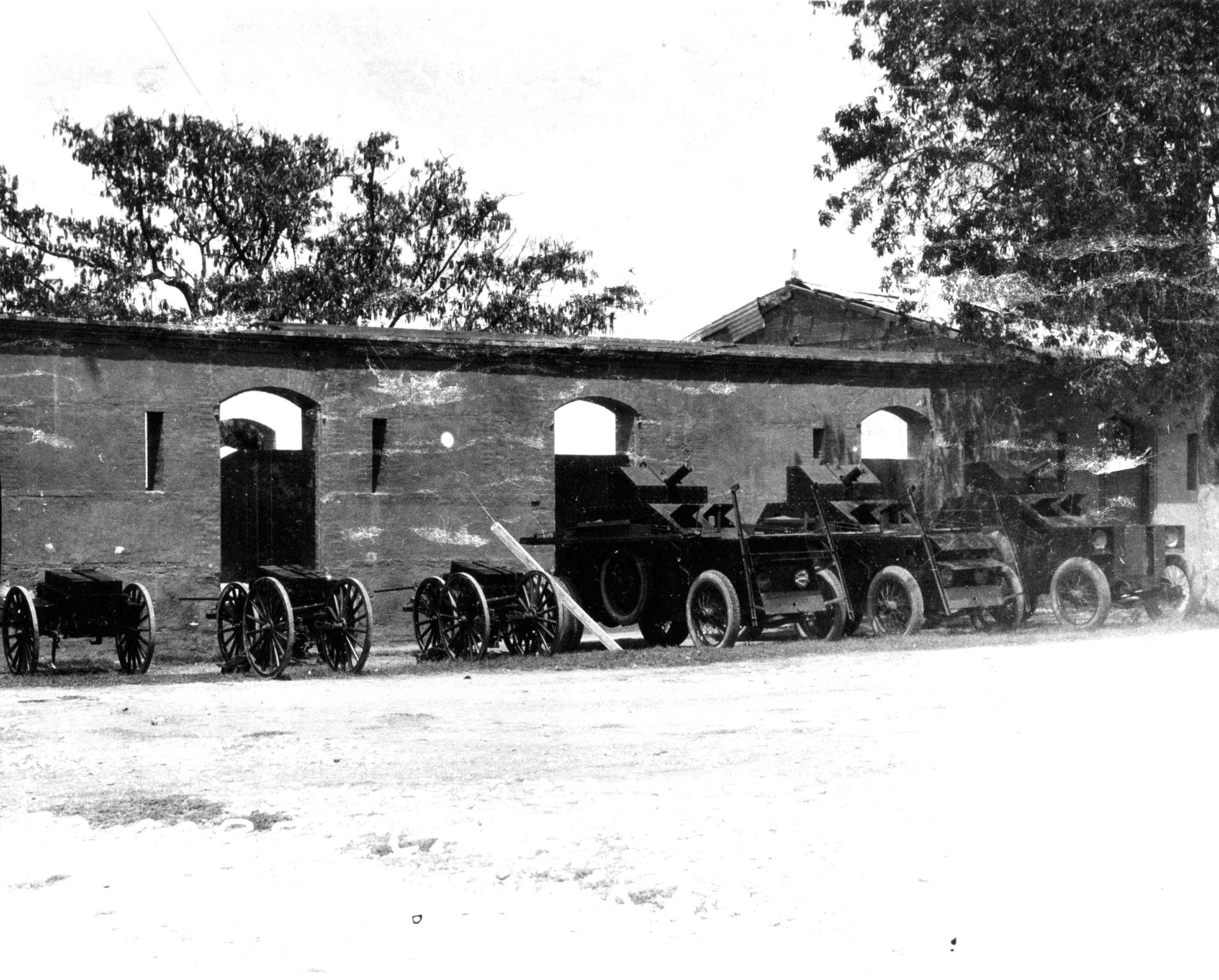
The 1st Armored Car Squadron in Haiti

The 1st Armored Car Squadron was a unit of the United States Marine Corps which was intended to utilize armored cars in combat. The unit was formed in 1916 in Philadelphia under Marine Captain Andrew B. Drum, falling under the Headquarters of the then-new 1st Marine Regiment.

Inspired by the British Army's use of the Rolls-Royce armored car, Franklin Roosevelt (then Assistant Secretary of the Navy) purchased two vehicles from the Armor Motor Car Company of Detroit. These were tested, and six more King armored cars were acquired and assigned to the squadron.

The unit never saw combat, and was disbanded at Quantico in May 1921.

== Sources ==
- At Marines.com
- Kenneth W. Estes. Marines under armor: the Marine Corps and the armored fighting vehicle, 1916-2000. Library of Naval Biography. Naval Institute Press, 2000. ISBN 1-55750-237-4, ISBN 978-1-55750-237-7. Pg 3
