= Mengele Zoo =

Novel by Gert Nygårdshaug

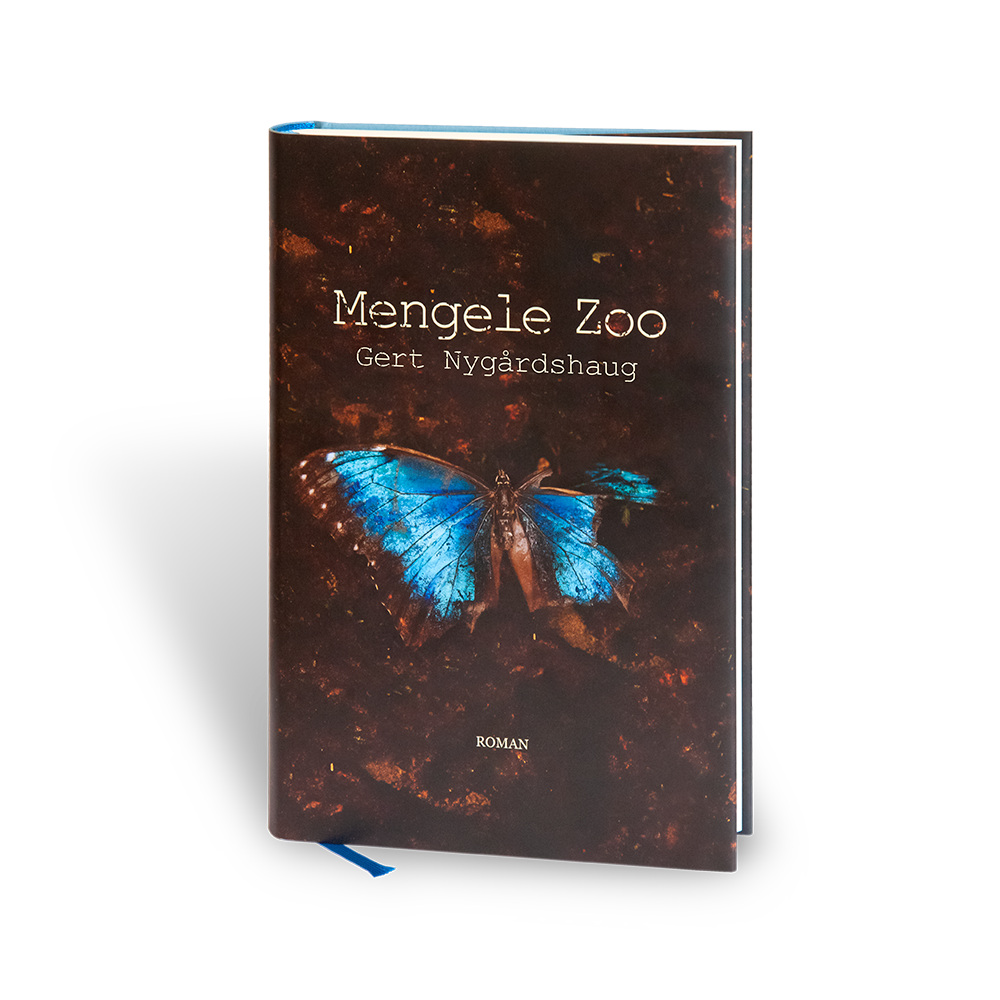
- Author: Gert Nygårdshaug
- Language: Norwegian
- Publication date: 1989
- ISBN: 9-585-63602-6

Mengele Zoo is a novel from 1989 by the Norwegian author Gert Nygårdshaug.

The story is about "Mino Aquiles Portoguesa" who is born in a village in Latin America's rain forests. His father teaches him to hunt butterflies. One day a disaster destroys his village, and "Mino" has to go out into the world alone. Eventually, he founds the "Mariposa Movement", named after (the fictional) butterfly species Mariposa mimosa. Mariposa is Spanish for "butterfly".

The book deals with topics such as environmental protection, north-south conflict and imperialism, and how you choose to prioritize their values. Despite the fact that Mengele Zoo describes the world as seen from one of the earth's most wanted terrorists' eyes, it is easy for the reader to take sides with "Mino" throughout the book. The character "Mino" appears also in later of Nygårdshaug's novels.

In May 2008 it was known that Nils Gaup was planning a film adaptation of the book. A Hollywood-based film production company first obtained the rights to the book, but because of financial problems they returned to Norway and the film was never produced.

The book was translated to French along with its two following books. A translation to English was started, but never finished.

== Awards ==
The book was voted "people's all time favourite" at the festival Lillehammer litteraturfestival in 2007.
