= Guci =

In Chinese culture, Guci (simplified Chinese: 鼓词; traditional Chinese: 鼓詞; pinyin: Gǔcí; lit. 'drum lyrics') are the prosimetric lyrics of dagu, one musical entertainment form in the shuochang or "speak and sing" genre. The performers narrate a story based on the lyrics, usually accompanied by singing, while beating a drum. Other accompanying musical instruments are sanxian, sihu, pipa and yangqin. The art form was very popular during the Ming Dynasty and Qing Dynasty, and therefore extant guci are very important in studying Chinese fiction from those period.
