= The Drummer =

The Drummer may refer to:

- Drummer (comics), a fictional character from the comic book Planetary by Warren Ellis and John Cassaday
- The Drummer (2007 film), a Hong Kong film directed by Kenneth Bi
- The Drummer (2020 film), an American film starring Danny Glover
- The Drummer (play), a 1716 play by Joseph Addison
- The Drummer (Flanagan), a bronze sculpture
- "The Drummer" (fairy tale), one of Grimms' Fairy Tales
- "The Drummer" (song), a 2022 song by the Red Hot Chili Peppers
