= Camp Drum =

Camp Drum refers to three US military facilities:

- An 1850s U.S. Army encampment that evolved into Fort Dalles, The Dalles, Oregon
- Drum Barracks or Camp Drum (1862–1873), a military encampment near Los Angeles, California
- Fort Drum, named Camp Drum from 1951–1973, near Watertown, New York
