= La Crosse Aquinas Catholic Schools =

School district in Wisconsin

Location
- La Crosse, Wisconsin USA-WI United States
- Coordinates: 43.806059°N 91.237102°W

District information
- Grades: Preschool-12th grade
- Established: 1975
- President: Ted Knutson
- Accreditation(s): Wisconsin Religious and Independent Schools; North Central Association; AdvancED

Students and staff
- Students: 1,084

Other information
- Website: www.aquinascatholicschools.org

La Crosse Aquinas Catholic Schools or ACS is a school district in La Crosse, Wisconsin and Onalaska, Wisconsin operated by the Roman Catholic Diocese of La Crosse. Previously known as Coulee Catholic Schools, the district changed its name to Aquinas Catholic Schools in 2009.

== History ==
In 1857, the first Catholic school opened in the Coulee Region. Since that time, as parishes were built, so were the schools, in some cases even before the Church. Area schools unified in 2000 under the name Coulee Catholic Schools to offer equal opportunities to all schools, standardized curriculum, and improve operational efficiency. On July 1, 2009, the school system was renamed Aquinas Catholic Schools, adopting the name of the patron saint of all Catholic schools.

== Schools ==
- Aquinas High School, La Crosse, Wisconsin
- Aquinas Middle School, La Crosse, Wisconsin
- Blessed Sacrament Elementary School, La Crosse, Wisconsin
- Cathedral Elementary School, La Crosse, Wisconsin
- St. Patrick Elementary School, Onalaska, Wisconsin
