= Dennis E. Spies =

American Catholic prelate (born 1968)

His Excellency, The Most Reverend Dennis Edward Spies
- Auxiliary Bishop of Joliet
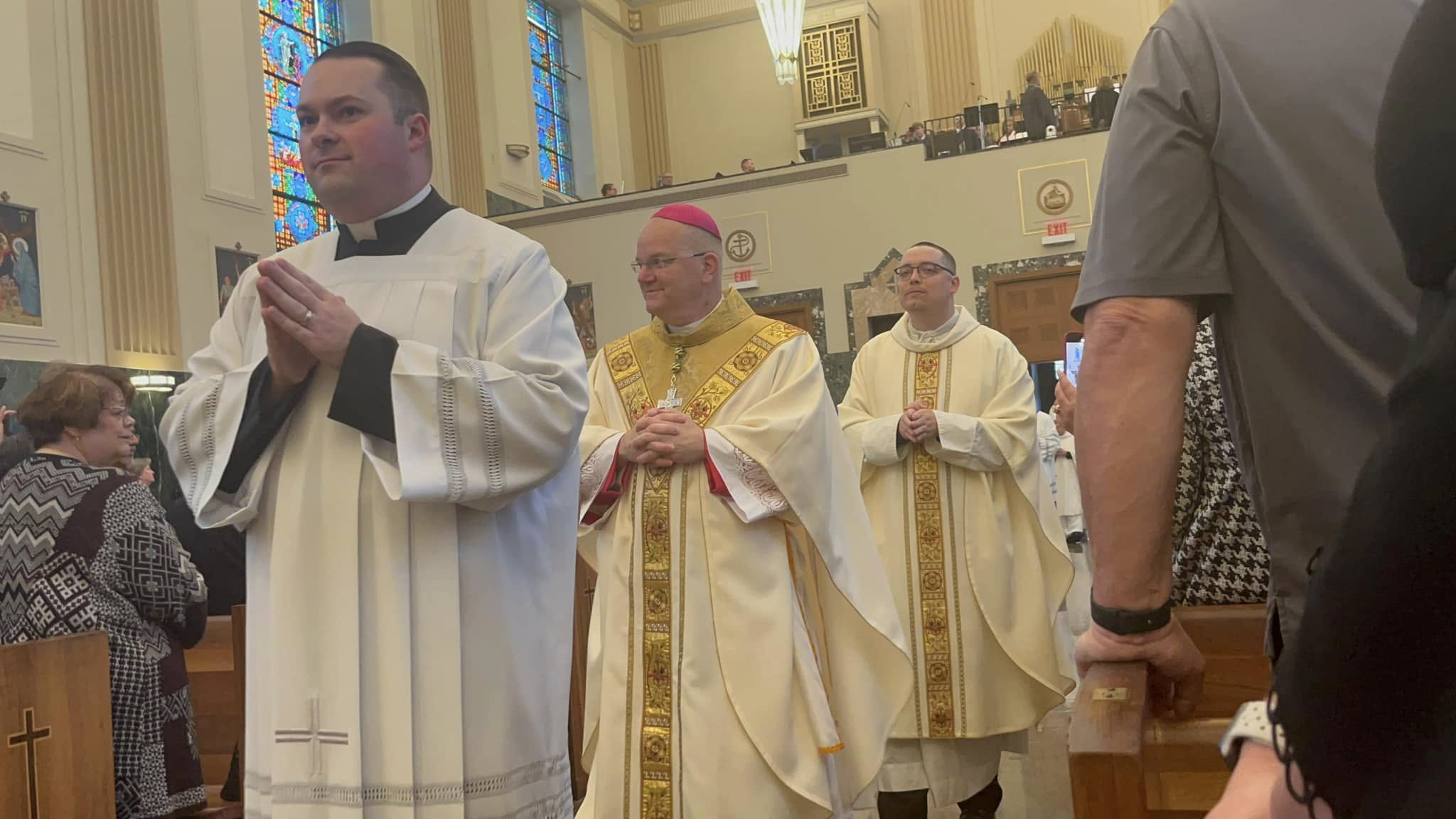
- Bishop Spies at his consecration at Cathedral of St. Raymond Nonnatus in 2024
- Diocese: Joliet
- Appointed: September 27, 2024
- Installed: November 6, 2024
- Other post: Titular Bishop of Cenculiana (2024‍–‍ )

Orders
- Ordination: June 1, 2002 by Joseph Leopold Imesch
- Consecration: November 6, 2024 by Ronald Aldon Hicks, J. Peter Sartain, and Joseph M. Siegel

Personal details
- Born: March 5, 1968 (age 58) Clifton, Illinois, US
- Education: Southern Illinois University Carbondale; Mundelein Seminary; University of Saint Mary of the Lake
- Motto: I call you friends

Styles of Dennis Edward Spies
- Reference style: His Excellency; The Most Reverend
- Spoken style: Your Excellency
- Religious style: Bishop

Dennis Edward Spies (born March 5, 1968) is an American prelate of the Catholic Church who serves as auxiliary bishop for the Diocese of Joliet in Illinois.

== Biography ==
=== Early life ===
Dennis Spies was born on March 5, 1968, to Rose Mary and the Late Vincent Spies. He was a member of Assumption of the Blessed Virgin Mary Parish in Ashkum, Illinois. Spies attended Ashkum Elementary School and Clifton Central High School. In 1990, Spies earned a bachelor's degree in agriculture business economics from Southern Illinois University Carbondale.

After graduating from college, Spies spent time with the National Evangelization Team of NET Ministries, then spent several years working on his family's soybean farm. Deciding to become a priest, Spies entered Mundelein Seminary in Mundelein, Illinois. In 2002, Spies received a Master of Divinity in Theology degree and a Licentiate in Sacred Theology from the University of Saint Mary of the Lake.

=== Priesthood ===
On June 1, 2002, Spies was ordained to the priesthood by Bishop Joseph L. Imesch for the Diocese of Joliet at the Cathedral of Saint Raymond Nonnatus in Joliet, Illinois. After his ordination, the diocese assigned Spies as associate pastor at the following parishes in Illinois:

- St. Walter's Parish in Roselle (2002 to 2005)
- St. Mary Immaculate Church in Plainfield (2005 to 2008)

Spies was then assigned as pastor at the following parishes from 2008 to 2011:

- Our Lady of Lourdes in Gibson City
- St George in Melvin
- Immaculate Conception in Roberts

Spies also served on the diocesan presbyterial council during this period. He served as pastor at St. Liborius Parish in Steger, Mother Teresa Catholic Academy in Crete, and St. Mary Parish in Park Forest, from 2013 to 2016.

In 2016, the archdiocese named Spies as director of pre-theology and Internship on the formation faculty at Mundelein Seminary. He was also named dean of the Will County Deanery and spiritual director of the Institute of Priestly Formation. In 2024, he was appointed vicar for clergy of the diocese by Bishop Ronald A. Hicks.

=== Episcopal career ===
Pope Francis appointed Spies as titular bishop of Cenculiana and as an auxiliary bishop of Joliet on September 27, 2024. On November 6, 2024, Spies was consecrated as a bishop at the Cathedral of Saint Raymond Nonnatus by Hicks. On February 9, 2026, Spies was appointed as Apostolic Administrator for the Diocese of Joliet.

== See also ==
- Catholic Church hierarchy
- Catholic Church in the United States
- Historical list of the Catholic bishops of the United States
- List of Catholic bishops of the United States
- Lists of patriarchs, archbishops, and bishops

Catholic Church titles
Preceded by -	Auxiliary Bishop of Joliet; 2024–present	Succeeded by -
