= James Edward Fitzgerald (bishop) =

James Edward Fitzgerald (December 30, 1938 – September 11, 2003) was an American Roman Catholic cleric who served as the Bishop of Joliet in Joliet, Illinois.

James Edward Fitzgerald Jr. was born on December 30, 1938, in Chicago to James E. and Winifred (Wade) Fitzgerald. He attended Our Lady of Peace School and St. Philip Neri School in Chicago, St. Michael School in Wheaton, and Marmion Military Academy in Aurora. He received a S.T.B. from Conception Seminary in Missouri and a M.Ed. in administration from DePaul University in Chicago.

Following ordination to the priesthood by Bishop Cletus O’Donnell at the Cathedral of St. Raymond Nonnatus in Joliet on May 23, 1964, Fitzgerald served at Sacred Heart Parish in Lombard and at Visitation Parish in Elmhurst as an assistant pastor. He became dean of students at St. Charles Borromeo Seminary in Romeoville in 1972 and then its rector in 1975. Fitzgerald was assigned as chaplain at the Cenacle Retreat House in Warrenville and then served as pastor of St. Rose Parish in Wilmington, St. Joseph Parish in Downers Grove and St. Mary Parish in Mokena.

On January 11, 2002, Pope John Paul II appointed Fitzgerald titular bishop of Walla Walla, Washington, and auxiliary bishop of the Diocese of Joliet. He was ordained a bishop on March 19, 2002, at the Cathedral of St. Raymond Nonnatus in Joliet by Bishop Joseph L. Imesch, with Bishop Roger Kaffer and Bishop Daniel Ryan serving as the principal co-consecrators.

Ten months later, Fitzgerald was diagnosed with a degenerative neurological disease. The Pope accepted his resignation as auxiliary bishop on June 5, 2003;

Fitzgerald died in his home on September 11, 2003. The Mass of Christian burial was offered on September 16, 2003, at the Cathedral of St. Raymond Nonnatus, and interment took place in the mausoleum in Resurrection Cemetery in Romeoville, Illinois.
