= Sehring Castle =

- Alternative names: The Castle

General information
- Status: In the process of being developed into a winery
- Architectural style: German Feudal
- Location: 310 Bridge Street, Joliet, Illinois
- Coordinates: 41°31′58.4″N 88°05′27.5″W
- Owner: Sehring Property Holding

The Sehring Castle, commonly referred to as "The Castle" by its neighbouring community, is a 19th-century limestone house. It was built by Frederick Sehring in 1892 beside his brewery to house him and his family. Through the course of its life it has had many different occupants and purposes. It stands to this day at 310 Bridge Street, Joliet, Illinois.

== Architecture ==
Sehring Castle was modelled after feudal Germanic architectural motifs. The German influence comes from Frederick Sehring's cultural roots. Built entirely from limestone found in the Joliet area, Sehring Castle also boasts a main tower turret to the left of its main entrance. Three other mini turrets are placed at each corner of the building. The balcony that hangs over the main entrance is supported by an arch that frames the main doors. Narrow windows wrap around the building in a uniform pattern. Tunnels are found running from one building to another on the property. These tunnels were used for storing the products of Fred Sehring Brewing Co. Recently, developers have excavated the foundation of Sehring Castle and found even more limestone that will benefit the restoration of the building.

== Fred Sehring Brewing Co. ==
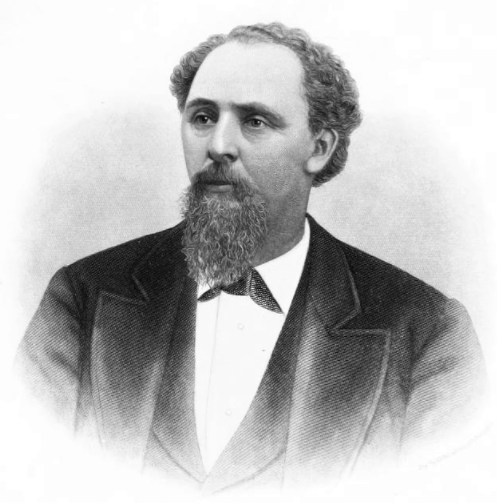
Frederick Sehring

Frederick Sehring was born December 19, 1834, in Hesse-Darmstadt, Germany. His family relocated in the United States when he was 13. He began his own brewing company in 1883, after being a shareholder in the brewing firm of Joseph Braun & Co. He appointed his family the administrative positions so as to keep the business within the family.

He built Sehring Castle beside his brewery, where he lived for six months before his death.

== The University of St. Francis ==
Sehring Castle was repurposed as student housing in the 1940s to accommodate the influx of students attending the University of St. Francis. The Catholic university acquired three buildings on Bridge Street, one of them being Sehring Castle. The building accommodated 14 students and two sisters.

== Diocese of Joliet ==
In 1963 the Sisters of St. Francis of Mary Immaculate offered Sehring Castle to the newly formed Diocese of Joliet. Bishop Martin D. McNamara moved into Sehring Castle during the process of his formal entry into the Diocese of Joliet as a bishop. Father Romeo Banchette shared the living space with Bishop McNamara until he became the second bishop of the Joliet Diocese. Afterwards Sehring Castle was used as an office space of the chancery, and other tribunal proceedings. In 2013 the Diocese of Joliet moved their chancery and tribunal to 425 Summit Street, Joliet, IL.

== Future plans ==
The plans listed are subject to change until further notice. Sehring Property Holdings, referencing Fred Sehring, has acquired the building with plans to develop it into a winery. The group consists of Phillip Soto, Damon Zdunich, Doug Zdunich, and Frank Miloslavich. The company is in the process of rezoning properties so that they may begin renovations. They plan to have Sehring Castle function as the "tasting room", wherein the many rooms will be separated into different environments (i.e. bar, kitchen, office, etc.).

The tunnels will function as the production site for wine, spirits, and whiskey.
