= Benet Academy =

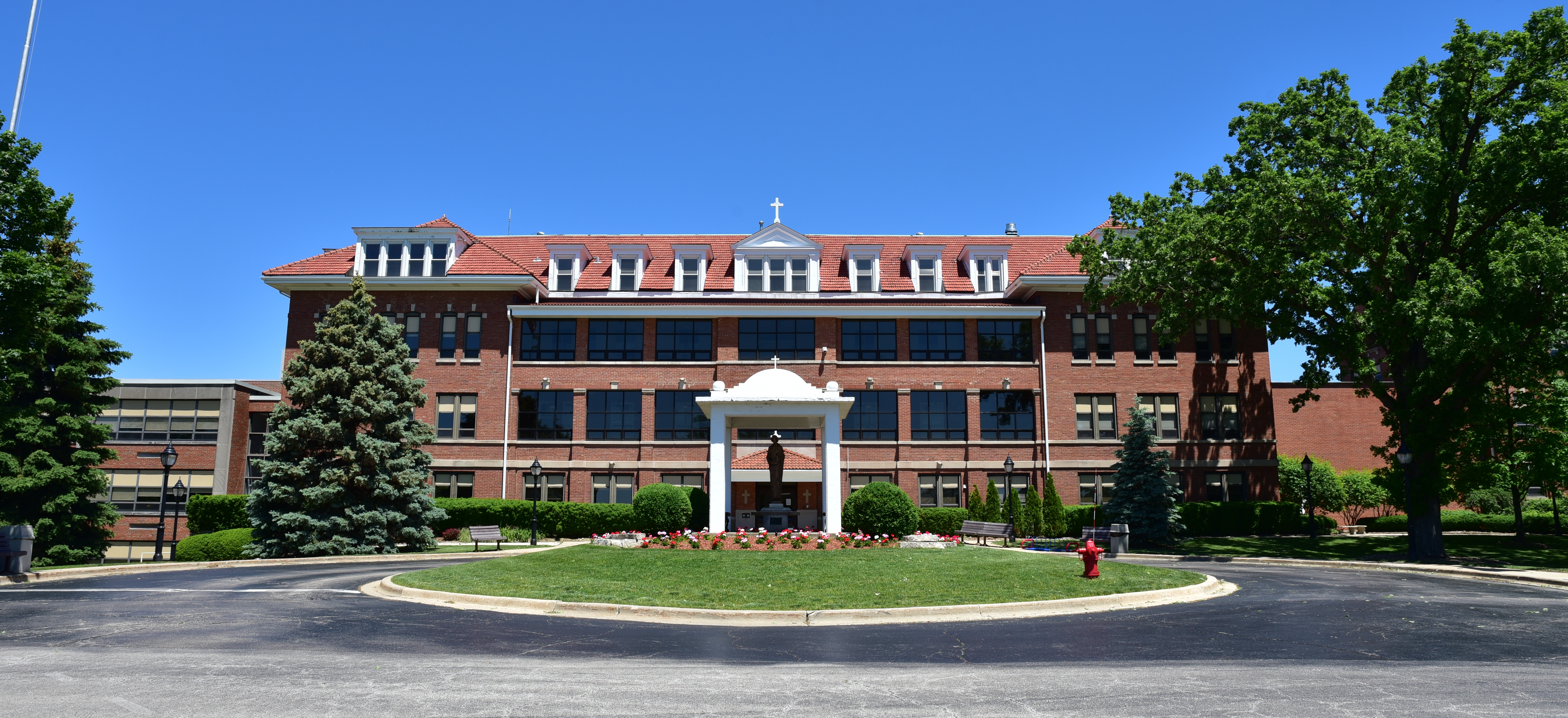
- The front of Benet Academy in 2021

Location
- 2200 Maple Avenue; Lisle, Illinois 60532; United States; 41.78°N 88.09°W

Information
- Other name: Benet
- Type: Private
- Motto: Ora et labora (Latin) (Pray and work)
- Religious affiliations: Roman Catholic (Benedictine)
- Patron saint: Saint Benedict
- Established: March 2, 1887; 139 years ago
- Authority: Benedictines
- Oversight: Diocese of Joliet
- President: William Myers
- Principal: Sheri Costello
- Grades: 9–12
- Gender: Co-educational
- Age range: 14–18
- Enrollment: 1,333 (2023)
- Campus type: Suburban
- Colors: Red and white
- Fight song: Go Redwings Go
- Athletics conference: CCL (Chicago Catholic League), GCAC (Girls Catholic Athletic Conference)
- Team name: Redwings
- National ranking: 129th (Niche 2024 Rankings)
- Newspaper: The Benet Herald
- Annual tuition: $15,950 (2025-2026)
- Website: www.benet.org

Benet Academy (/ˈbɛnɛt/ BEN-et) is a private, highly competitive, college-preparatory, Benedictine high school in Lisle, Illinois, United States, overseen by the Diocese of Joliet. Founded in 1886, the school was initially established in Chicago as the all-boys St. Procopius College and Academy by Benedictine monks, who also operated the St. Joseph Bohemian Orphanage. In 1898, the orphanage moved to Lisle, about 25 miles (40 km) west of Chicago, to be joined by St. Procopius three years later. In 1926, Benedictine nuns constructed the all-girls Sacred Heart Academy near the orphanage and school in Lisle. The orphanage closed in 1956 to make room for St. Procopius Academy, which separated from the college in 1969. Due to rising costs and waning enrollment, Sacred Heart merged with St. Procopius Academy in 1967 to form Benet Academy on the St. Procopius campus. Since then, numerous building projects have been undertaken to expand Benet's athletics, music, and science programs.

Admission is competitive and relies on entrance exam scores, transcripts, and performance on standardized tests. All students complete a college-preparatory curriculum and may earn college credit through programs including Advanced Placement. As of 2023, Benet's average ACT test score regularly exceeds state and national averages, and more than 99 percent of students go on to college after graduation. The school's academic program has been featured in reports by the Chicago Sun-Times and U.S. News & World Report.

Notable alumni of the school include Bishop Robert Barron, NBA player Frank Kaminsky, Jim Ryan, and Grammy-winning singer Dave Bickler.

== History ==
=== Founding in Chicago ===
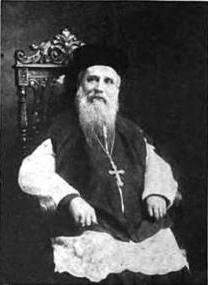
John Nepomucene Jaeger, born in Kuttenberg, Bohemia (now Kutná Hora in the western Czech Republic) in 1844, championed founding a parochial school for the children of Chicago's Czech immigrants.

In the aftermath of the Great Chicago Fire, Chicago's working-class Pilsen neighborhood, a predominantly Czech enclave, expanded quickly. To serve this growing ethnic population, St. Procopius parish was founded in the summer of 1875, near the intersection of 18th and Allport Streets. The parish was named for Saint Procopius of Sázava, who founded a monastery in Bohemia in the eleventh century and became the first saint from Czechoslovakia. Vilém Čoka served as the first pastor. Planning to build a school, Čoka left it to the community to decide if the school would be secular or Catholic. They chose a Catholic school, despite the fact that only 25 percent of Pilsen's Czech population was Catholic. As the parish outgrew his capacity to serve them, Čoka turned for help to the Order of St. Benedict.

John Nepomucene Jaeger, the first Bohemian abbot in the United States, was urged to establish a monastic community to teach at parochial schools in Bohemian as well as English. He founded St. Procopius priory in 1885. The priory took control of St. Procopius parish in January 1886, and Jaeger became the pastor. Jaeger also founded a convent in 1895, consisting of nuns brought from St. Mary's Convent in Pittsburgh and headed by Jaeger's biological sister, Mother Mary Nepomucene Jaeger. The Czech-American media had pushed for a convent to prepare Czech-speaking nuns for teaching positions in Czech parochial schools, which had previously hired mostly lay teachers trained in Austrian normal schools. The nuns were transferred from Pittsburgh to St. Scholastica's Convent on Chicago's north side, but later that same year moved to an old parish building at Ashland and 19th Streets, where they would remain until 1912. A section of the convent was converted into a music school. Graduates taught in parishes throughout the nation.

The priory was elevated to the status of abbey by Pope Leo XIII in 1894, and the monks founded a school for lay monks to help build a self-sustaining source of revenue. Failing to attract a single prospective applicant in over seven years, they expanded enrollment to students with no intention of joining the clergy. The two groups would eventually be taught separately, and the monastic students were trained to become priests fluent in Bohemian, German, and English and prepared to preach to ethnically diverse congregations. Lay students were trained for employment in the business world.

In 1900, Chicago had one of the largest Czech populations of any city in the world, with approximately 75,000–100,000 Czechs living in the city's 10 Czech communities. Some 50,000 Czech immigrants were served by the three Czech parishes of Chicago—16,000 to 20,000 of them by St. Procopius. These Czech immigrants wanted to assimilate into American society, but also wanted to pass their language on to their children. The abbey established St. Procopius College and Academy in 1887 as a school that taught men of Czech and Slovak descent. It became the first Czech institution of higher learning in the nation, and in 1920 it remained the only Czech college. Procopius Neuzil was named the first teacher and director. Classes began on March 2, 1887, when Neuzil taught a remedial course to two students in two small rooms at 704 Allport Street. Enrollment grew to 20 within the week, taught by three instructors during the four-month term. The first full year of classes began in the fall of 1887. The college was chartered by the State of Illinois in 1890; only a two-year high school program was offered at the time. In 1893 the college published its first catalog, which urged Czech parents to enroll their 13-year-old boys. The academic curriculum included a preparatory year to teach elementary school subjects to remedial students. The two high school years were referred to as "Latin years", and included required courses in Czech, English, Latin, math, orthography, history, and religion; optional courses included German and bookkeeping. Following the Latin years, students were enrolled in the business course, which included math, bookkeeping, economics, composition, history, oratory, and religion.

=== Orphanage ===
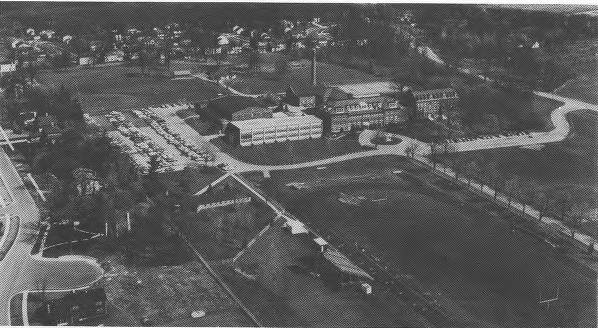
Aerial view of the Benet campus, from the south, in 1984. Benet Academy was created from the merger of the St. Procopius Academy for boys and Sacred Heart Academy for girls in 1967.

The Benet Academy campus in Lisle began as an orphanage. On March 14, 1899, the abbey founded St. Joseph's Orphanage on a farm in Lisle purchased from one Serafin Rott, and transferred 10 Czech orphans there from St. Hedwig's Polish Orphanage, which charged the parishes more for housing non-Polish orphans. It opened under the supervision of the Sisters of St. Benedict. Abbot Jaeger allowed the orphanage to use the land for free until more satisfactory housing could be constructed. The orphanage lacked stoves, fuel, adequate bedding, decent food, and any stable source of income. Neuzil, then editor-in-chief of the Czech Benedictine Press, raised $80,000 within 12 years from the generally impoverished Czech immigrant community through local publications. A new building was commissioned in 1899 to accommodate the increasing number of applicants for admission, including orphans from out-of-state. The new building was dedicated on July 2, 1900, at the same time as the cornerstone was laid for St. Procopius College, about .25 miles (0.40 km) away.

Due to increasing applications for admission, still more space was required, and William Schwartz sold the abbey 40 acres (16 ha) of land in Lisle. On July 16, 1911, a new building was dedicated on the grounds of what is now Benet Academy, the same day the cornerstone was laid for the nearby Sacred Heart Convent. A girls' dormitory building was built in 1923. It was later converted into classrooms and renamed Benet Hall). A power plant, a larger chapel, and additional classrooms were dedicated in 1926. A gym was built in 1936; at that time the facility housed approximately 400 orphans. Twenty-three headstones from that period can be found in a small cemetery on the northwest side of the school, where orphans as young as three, one of the workmen, and several former orphans who had been raised at St. Joseph are buried. According to school lore, ghosts of orphans still haunt the fourth floor of St. Joseph Hall and the basement of Benet Hall, where the nursery of the orphanage once was.

Elementary schooling at the orphanage featured better equipped classrooms than the original building. A few years after operations moved in 1911, the school offered a two-year business program. By 1948 the orphanage comprised the Lisle Manual Training School for Boys and the Lisle Industrial School for Girls, both of which were managed by the Sisters of St. Benedict and run by the Archdiocese of Chicago. In the 1950s Petru Hall was built as an annex on the east side of the dormitory building.

The archdiocese assumed control of the orphanage in 1920, and began accepting orphans from the Juvenile Court of Cook County, most of whom came from broken homes whose parents did not pay the fines imposed by the court. This discouraged donations and strained the orphanage financially. Archbishop Samuel Cardinal Stritch, discovering that only 12 of the 255 children were actually orphans and only five of them were Slavs, closed the orphanage in 1956. The 12 true orphans were moved to Holy Angels Orphanage in Des Plaines. Bishop of Joliet Martin Dewey McNamara gave the former orphanage buildings to St. Procopius Academy, which was at that time still combined with the college.

=== College in Lisle ===
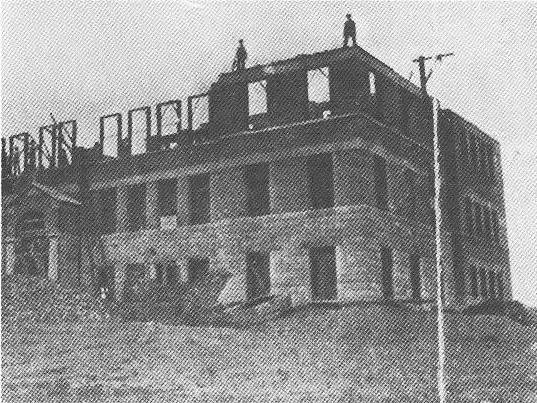
St. Procopius College under construction on July 23, 1900. The mission of the college was "not only to train candidates for the priesthood, but give young men in general such an education as to prepare them to become leaders of their people in the various walks of life."

As enrollment increased to 46 in 1891, it became obvious that St. Procopius College's enrollment would soon outstrip its facilities in Pilsen. Neuzil was replaced as rector by Ildephonse Wittman, also a Benedictine, in 1894. In 1896, the Abbey bought a 104-acre (42 ha) farm in Lisle from Morris Neff to provide more space and a "better atmosphere". On March 12, 1900, a new building was approved, to be built at the southwest corner of Maple and College Avenues. The groundbreaking was held on April 19, 1900, the school moved in May, and the new facility was dedicated on July 1, 1901, by Peter Muldoon, Bishop of the Diocese of Chicago. Classes began in September with six faculty and 11 students. Atheists in Chicago vehemently objected to the Catholic church-run school, but the Czech community came to the school's defense. Limited financial aid for the generally poor Czech immigrants led to meager enrollment. Attendance grew from 13 in 1901 to 100 in 1908.

The academy offered its first four-year high school program in 1904, with both "classical", or college-preparatory, and "commercial", or vocational, programs. Students enrolled in the commercial track studied for three years, the first two being identical to the classical track and the third consisting of specialized coursework. The commercial program was dropped in 1915. Tuition for a semester cost $80; it was increased to $100 in 1909. As of 1921, the school enrolled only men of Bohemian or Slovak ancestry.

Income and enrollment fell during the Great Depression. Between 1917 and 1930, enrollment fell from 205 students to 140. The school sought accreditation from the North Central Association of Colleges and Schools, but the application was denied because the college and academy could not be accredited as a single institution, and financial constraints prevented their separation. In 1932 the abbey and the school lost most of their money when the Kaspar American Bank in Chicago failed. Academic programs and student activities were not greatly affected, in part because the faculty was mainly clergymen, who were not highly paid. Still unaccredited, the school was certified by the state of Illinois in September 1934.

Students, faculty, and clergymen sustained themselves with food produced on the 365-acre (148 ha) Abbey Farm, which they maintained until the 1970s. Approximately 1,500 chickens provided eggs, while Brown Swiss cattle provided milk. Meat came from the farm's supply of bulls, hogs, and heifers. Bee hives produced honey and wax, while a cannery produced more than 12,000 US gallons (45,000 L) of food products.

World War II caused enrollment to decline and the student body consisted mainly of high school students and seminarians. Following the war, new students enrolled, and the school built a temporary facility in 1947 to accommodate them. Students from Illinois began to replace out-of-state students, the percentage of day, or commuting, students rose, and the school employed more lay teachers. After the war, the previously ethnic Czech college acquired a more diverse student body, due to rising enrollment caused by the G.I. Bill. By 1947 the high school enrolled 30 students. Better times and higher birth rates led to growing enrollment at St. Procopius in the 1950s and 1960s.

With the gift of the former orphanage facility, the academy began to operate independently from the college in 1957. It was accredited on March 28, 1958. St. Procopius College was renamed Illinois Benedictine College in 1971, and Benedictine University in 1996. Under the leadership of its first principal, Rev. Thomas J. Havlik, the academy added new classrooms and St. Martin Hall to its facilities.

=== Convent in Lisle ===
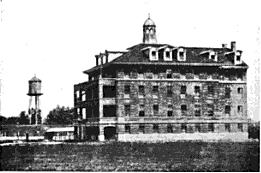
The Benedictine Convent and Normal School in Lisle, one-fourth complete, in 1913. Sacred Heart Academy was founded here in 1926.

By 1912, the community of nuns had outgrown their convent in Chicago, and relocated to the new Convent of the Sacred Heart in Lisle. They had prospered there as a teaching order educating Slovak-speaking nuns and organized two Slovak schools. In 1926, under the leadership of Mother Mary Genevieve, the convent founded a day and boarding high school for girls—the Sacred Heart Academy. The academy outgrew its space and in 1929 the convent was expanded to accommodate rising enrollment. The annexed facilities reserved for the school included a Renaissance-style chapel, an auditorium, and a gymnasium. The academy was later expanded to include the Jaeger Junior College.

The academy was primarily a boarding school. Students came from Illinois, the surrounding states, Texas, and Mexico. A few day students came from the Lisle area. In 1947 enrollment averaged 75 students. Enrollment grew from 120 in 1953 to 300 in 1958, and remained at that level until 1966. Day student enrollment also grew and in 1962 the academy stopped accepting boarding school students. By 1964, the last year in which boarding school students were enrolled, alumni had hailed from all US states, South America, France, Mexico, and Guam. Day students from 1964 to 1968 came from Lisle and the neighboring communities. Unlike St. Procopius Academy, Sacred Heart Academy offered a business curriculum from 1953 to 1966. Courses included shorthand, typewriting, and bookkeeping.

The students and nuns were supplied with food by the convent's 476-acre (193 ha) Benedale Farm. Cattle provided both dairy products and meat, while poultry provided eggs and their feathers were used to stuff pillows as another source of income. The nuns also raised rabbits and bees, and grew grain, hay, vegetables, grapes, and apples. The farm was closed in the late 1950s for financial reasons and the convent sold most of the land so a school could be built for the growing village of Lisle.

=== Merger and expansion ===
Map of the Benet Academy campus. Founded as an orphanage in 1910, the campus has been steadily expanded since. A Science and Activity Center was added in 2009.

In the 1960s, St. Procopius Academy faced dwindling enrollment and funding. The Benedictines threatened to close the boys' school, but were dissuaded by Abbot Daniel W. Kucera, who had graduated from St. Procopius in 1941. Under Abbot Kucera's leadership, St. Procopius Academy and Sacred Heart Academy merged to form Benet (an anglicized form of "Benedict") Academy in 1967, on the former St. Procopius campus. Enrollment in 1968 was at 875 students, including 575 boys and 300 girls. The business education program from Sacred Heart was continued at the new school; three teachers taught courses in consumer economics, typewriting, shorthand, and bookkeeping.

St. Thomas Hall, funded by a private donor, was erected to house a library and physical sciences facilities in 1975. A major construction project was launched in 1993, in response to increasing enrollment and a growing athletic program. The $5 million building plan included a new 1,800-seat gymnasium, a new boiler system and a new roof for the cafeteria and the existing gymnasium. New parking areas were planned and St. Mary's Hall was to be demolished.

Neighborhood residents, concerned about the impact on property values, traffic, and aesthetics, opposed the project. The Lisle Village Board blocked construction, charging that Benet had not notified the local community of the pending construction, to which Benet replied that "the school was there prior to the homes being constructed". The plan was approved in April, but the Board designated the entire 42-acre (17 ha) campus a "planned-unit development", requiring Board approval for all future modifications. The new facilities included zoned lighting areas, which allowed for multipurpose use for assemblies, performances, sporting events, and graduation ceremonies. Construction was completed in May 1994, and applications increased in the years that followed. The gym was later named as the St. Ronald Gymnasium to honor former principal, Rev. Ronald Rigovsky.

=== 21st century ===
In June 2000, a need for more performance space became apparent; the school's music groups used small, crowded rehearsal rooms and drama students performed in the old chapel or across the street at Sacred Heart Monastery. Benet began construction of a new 22,000-square-foot (2,000 m^{2}) performing arts center at the east end of the campus to replace the 190-seat Assembly Hall on the third floor of St. Joseph Hall, originally a chapel for the St. Joseph Bohemian Orphanage. As part of the project, the room was converted back into a chapel, named the Chapel of St. Therese.

Petru Hall, which was used for the annual school auction after the orphans left, was demolished to make way for the new performing arts center, named St. Daniel Hall, after Abbot Daniel Kucera and Saint Daniel. Constructed of brick and pre-cast concrete, the design includes arched entrances to match the other buildings on campus. The facility features a 369-seat auditorium, an outdoor theater complex, a rehearsal room for bands and choirs, a set-construction area, and storage areas. In addition to plays and concerts, St. Daniel Hall is also used for assemblies, lectures, and masses, which had previously been held in the gymnasium.

In May 2007, the school broke ground on a new $16 million science and student activity center. The 50,000-square-foot (4,600 m^{2}) building includes extra corridors to ease hall traffic, a larger cafeteria, and additional storage space, along with four combination classrooms and laboratories for biology and earth science, three chemistry classrooms, and two chemistry labs. In 2013, the school developed the supplementary St. Scholastica campus to have space for additional student parking and new athletic facilities.

In the fall of 2015, Benet began its Building + Inspiring + Leading strategic initiative to evaluate ways to improve the student experience. This led to the construction of St. Mary Hall, which was completed in August 2020. This $10.2 million, 33,000 sq. ft. addition included multipurpose rooms for the performing arts, a new 5,100 sq. ft. Library & Collaboration Center, and an outdoor space for gathering, contemplation, and prayer. The addition also included a large gallery space for academic and social events and collaborative work, classrooms, rehearsal rooms, new restrooms, and additional storage. The new space connected the existing St. Daniel and St. Thomas Halls.

In September 2021, the school became the subject of controversy when it was revealed that an offer to employ Benet alumna Amanda Kammes as a lacrosse coach was rescinded after administrators learned that Kammes was in a same-sex marriage. After a series of community protests took place, the school announced that it had re-extended its hiring offer to Kammes and that she had accepted. Shortly after this decision was announced, Austin G. Murphy, abbot of St. Procopius Abbey, released a statement saying that he was "deeply troubled" by the actions of Academy administrators, and that he would be "taking this matter to prayer" in order to discern how to proceed. On 4 January 2022, the school and St. Procopius Abbey released a joint statement announcing the termination of the governance and oversight agreement between the abbey and Benet. On 30 March 2022, the school announced that it had reached an agreement with the Diocese of Joliet's Catholic Schools Office to "collaborate to promote and enhance" Benet's college-preparatory education in the Benedictine tradition beginning 1 July 2022.

== Admissions & Tuition ==
Admission is competitive and primarily based on the High School Placement Test, a standardized test by Scholastic Testing Service, taken in December of applicants' eighth grade year. According to the Daily Herald, schools like Benet hope to accept the top 40 percent of students taking the exam. Seventh grade transcripts and a student essay are also factors in admission. In 2003–04, 900 students applied for admission, 387 were accepted, and 338 enrolled. As of the years 2013-2018 2 out of 4 students (50%) were accepted.

Preference is given to siblings of current or former Benet students. In 1993 the average admitted eighth grader scored in the 87th percentile on the placement test. Applicants without siblings at the school were admitted only with scores above the 75th percentile; applicants with siblings at Benet were admitted with scores as low as the 50th percentile on a case-by-case basis.

Tuition is $15,950 for the 2025-2026 academic year. After graduation, 99.5% of students from this school go on to attend a 4-year college. Scholarships are offered, however highly selective.

== Academics ==
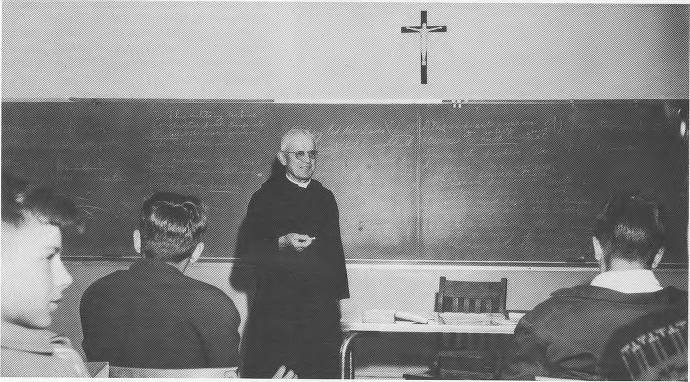
Until July 2022, Benet was owned and operated by St. Procopius Abbey; many of the Benedictine community's monks have taught at the school, as seen here in 1984

As of the 2024-2025 school year, students are required to complete 23.5 Carnegie units of a college-preparatory curriculum to graduate, including four units of English, two units of foreign language, three units of math, one unit of world history, one unit of US history, three units of lab science, four units of religion, 1.5 units of physical education, and four units of electives. Spanish, French, German, and Latin are offered as foreign languages. The school offers neither vocational nor remedial courses.

22 Advanced Placement courses are offered for college credit, as well as participation in the Benedictine University Future Scholars Program, which offers college-level work in multivariable calculus and finite mathematics.

The Chicago Sun-Times ranked Benet one of the top ten high schools in the Chicago area in 2003, based on graduate enrollment rates at four-year colleges and test scores over a four-year period. In 1999 Benet was also one of two high schools in DuPage County, and 100 high schools nationwide, featured as an "Outstanding American High School" by U.S. News & World Report. The study, conducted in conjunction with the National Opinion Research Center at the University of Chicago, identified schools "where students progress steadily toward high academic standards and where every student matters." Benet has credited the school's academic success to Ronald Rigovsky, who served as principal for 23 years and as president from 1987 to 1992. During the monk's tenure, said the Chicago Tribune, Rigovsky developed the school into "one of the highest scoring and most scholastically respected high schools in the Chicago area."

Benet Academy is accredited by/associated with the AdvancED commission, the Illinois State Board of Education, the National Catholic Educational Association, Independent Schools Association of the Central States, National Honor Society of Secondary Schools, Illinois High School Association, and Benedictine University

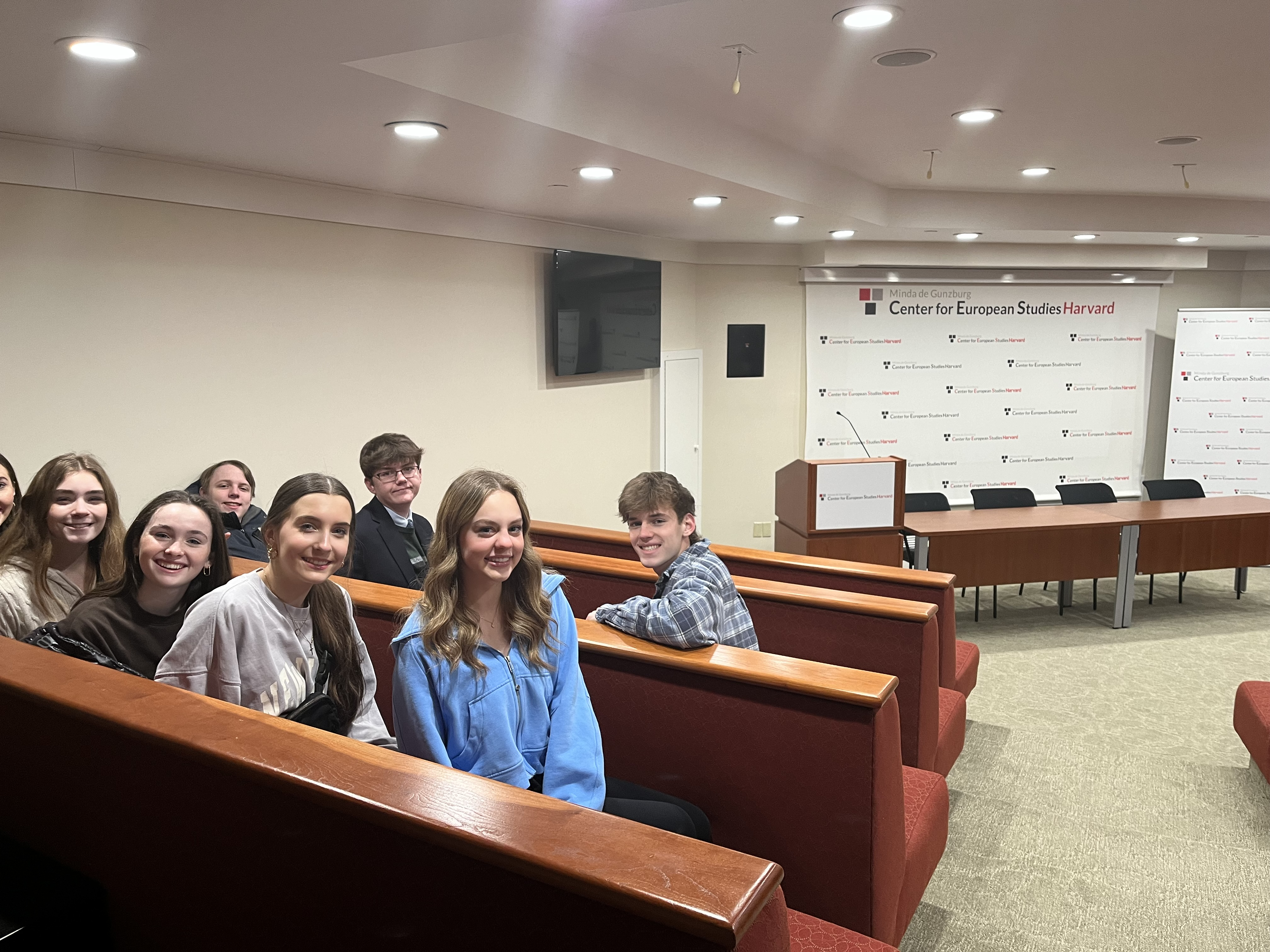
Benet Scholars sit in on a lecture at Harvard University.

=== Scholars Program ===
In 2023, the Benet Academy Scholars Program was founded to recognize high-achieving students and challenge them. 7.7% of students were selected. Members must maintain high GPAs, take advanced classes, and do public service hour to remain in the program. Speakers are welcomed to address scholars each year.

== Students and faculty ==
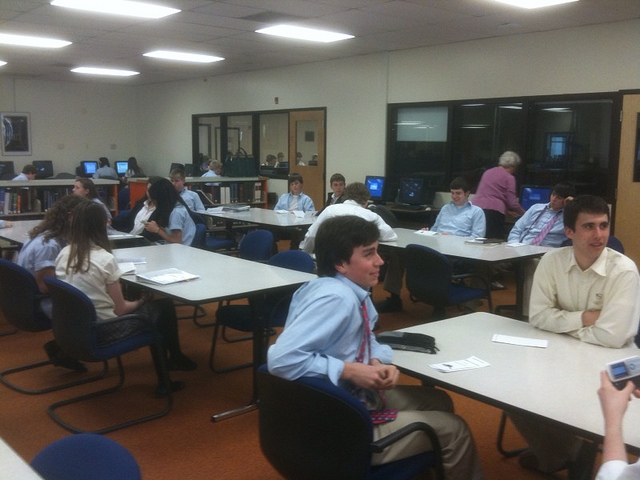
Benet students are often from western Chicago suburbs and Roman Catholic. Over 99% continue on to college.

Benet enrolled 1,333 students in 2023–24. Most students come from Catholic families with professional and college-educated parents. In 2003–04, 97 percent of students were Roman Catholic; two percent received financial aid, which totaled $3,000. Tuition was $6,000. The average class size was 27 students. Most students come from Lisle, Downers Grove, and Naperville, but students in the class of 2023 came from 85+ different area schools.

The Benet graduating class of 2020 achieved an average composite score of 30.0 (above the 92nd percentile) on the ACT, a standardized college admission test, which was the seventh straight year average score topped 28, compared to a statewide average of 24.7 and national average of 20.6. In 2000, Benet outscored all DuPage County high schools, which then-Principal Ernest Stark attributed to its closed campus policy, silent study halls, and "more focused" and "not very fancy" curriculum. In 1993, Benet's average ACT score exceeded those of 195 public high schools in northern Illinois, second only to the Illinois Mathematics and Science Academy, a selective residential school for gifted students.

In 2023, Benet had five National Merit Finalists and 17 National Merit Commended Scholars in the National Merit Scholarship Program and 115 students were named Illinois State Scholars, an honor awarded to top ten percent of seniors in the state and based on test scores, class rank, or both.

In 2023, 457 students took a total of 774 Advanced Placement exams and 79 percent of them scored at least a three out of five. 43 National AP Scholar with Distinction awards were granted to students who averaged at least 3.5 on all exams taken and scored at least a 3 on five or more exams, 21 AP Scholar with Honor awards were granted to students who scored at least a 3.25 on all exams taken and scored at least a 3 on four or more exams, and 50 AP Scholar awards were granted to students who scored at least a 3 on three or more exams. Benet does not report class rankings.

More than 99 percent of Benet graduates go to college; roughly 1 percent serve in the military. A total of $71 million in scholarships was offered to the class of 2023.

Benet students were implicated in the University of Illinois clout scandal, in which some applicants were given preferential admission to the University of Illinois at Urbana-Champaign (UIUC) despite having sub-par qualifications. The Chicago Tribune, investigating the scandal, reported that a majority of students who were admitted to UIUC through political favors came from elite, affluent high schools such as Benet, where families were politically connected with elected officials and university trustees. An email between admissions officers revealed that a female Benet student was admitted to the university's College of Liberal Arts and Sciences, despite the fact that she had ranked lower than 27 of her classmates who were put on a waiting list or denied admission. Between 2005 and 2009, thirteen applicants from Benet were alleged to have had political connections; eight of them were admitted to UIUC.

In 2024 Benet employed 80 faculty. The average tenure was 17 years. 25 current or former faculty members served for 25 years or more.

== Activities ==
=== Sports ===
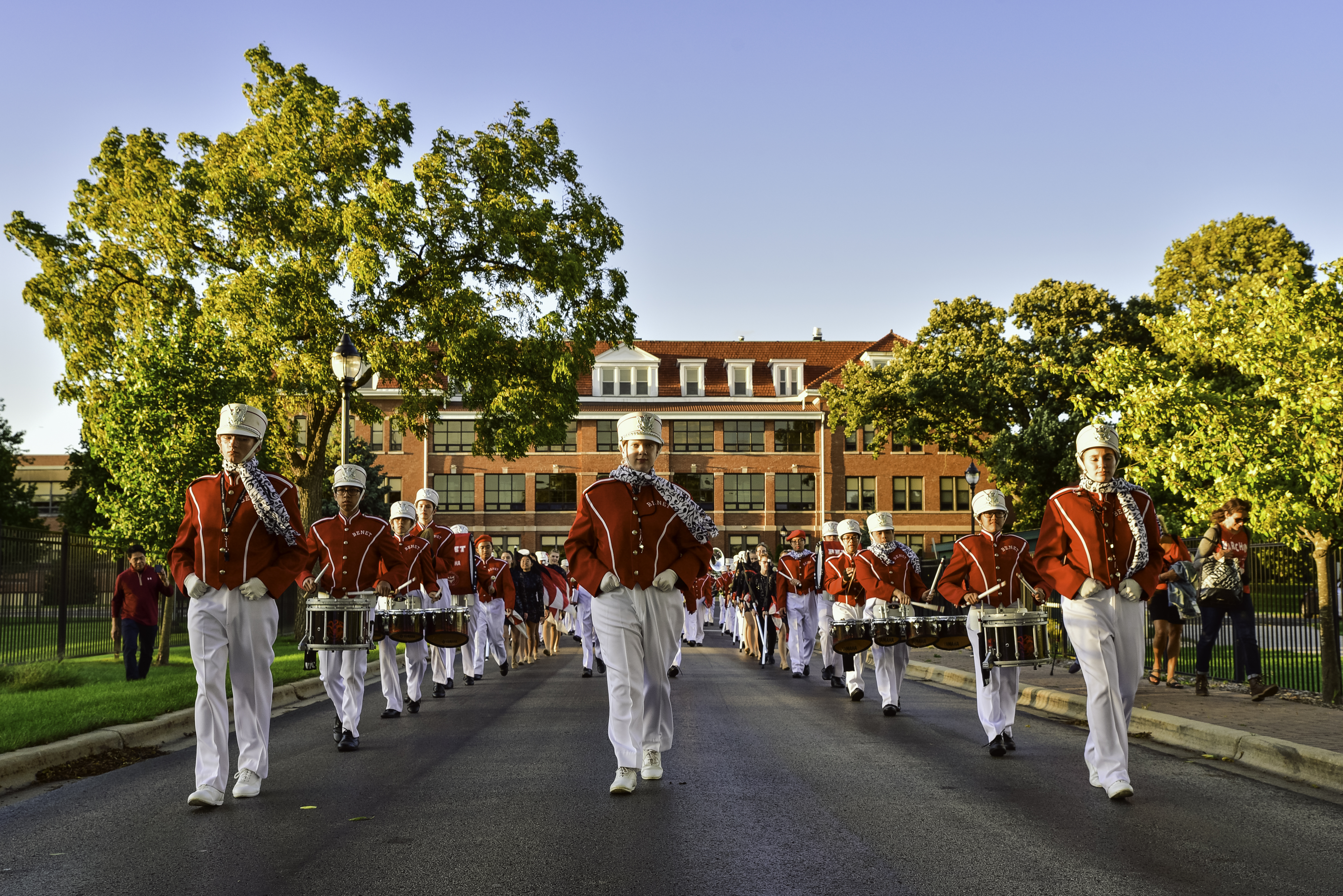
The Benet Academy Marching Redwings, march toward Benedictine University to perform at a Benet football game.

The St. Procopius Academy football team played its first game against Downers Grove High School on Thanksgiving Day, 1917. At first some faculty members did not approve of American football, but it became respected on campus in the 1920s under the direction of the monk Benedict Bauer. Bauer served as Athletic Director until 1927 while also coaching basketball, baseball, and football, and planned the construction of a new gymnasium in 1925. The college's varsity baseball team won conference championships in 1924 and 1925, and the football team defeated the University of Notre Dame freshman team in 1925.

Benet competes in the Chicago Catholic League (CCL) and Girls Catholic Athletic Conference (GCAC), part of the Illinois High School Association (IHSA). The school sponsors teams, named the Benet Academy Redwings, for men and women in basketball, cross country, golf, lacrosse, soccer, swimming and diving, tennis, track and field, volleyball, and bass fishing. Only men compete in baseball, football, and ice hockey. Only women compete in cheerleading and softball. Since 1978, Benet has placed in the top four at least once in state tournaments in basketball, cross country, football, soccer, and tennis. In 2000-01 and 2001-02 seasons the boys' soccer team were state champions, and in 2000 they were ranked 11th in the nation. In 2008–09, the girls' volleyball team finished second in the state. From 2021-2024, the girls' volleyball team finished second in the state consecutively. In the 2024 season, the girls' volleyball team featured 11 athletes committed to Division 1 schools. In November 2010 six student-athletes signed letters of intent to play at NCAA Division I universities. The school's boys' basketball team was also ranked sixth in the nation in February 2011 by USA Today. In 2014 the basketball team finished second in state. The boys basketball team finished second in state again in 2023. The girls soccer team finished second in state in 2023.

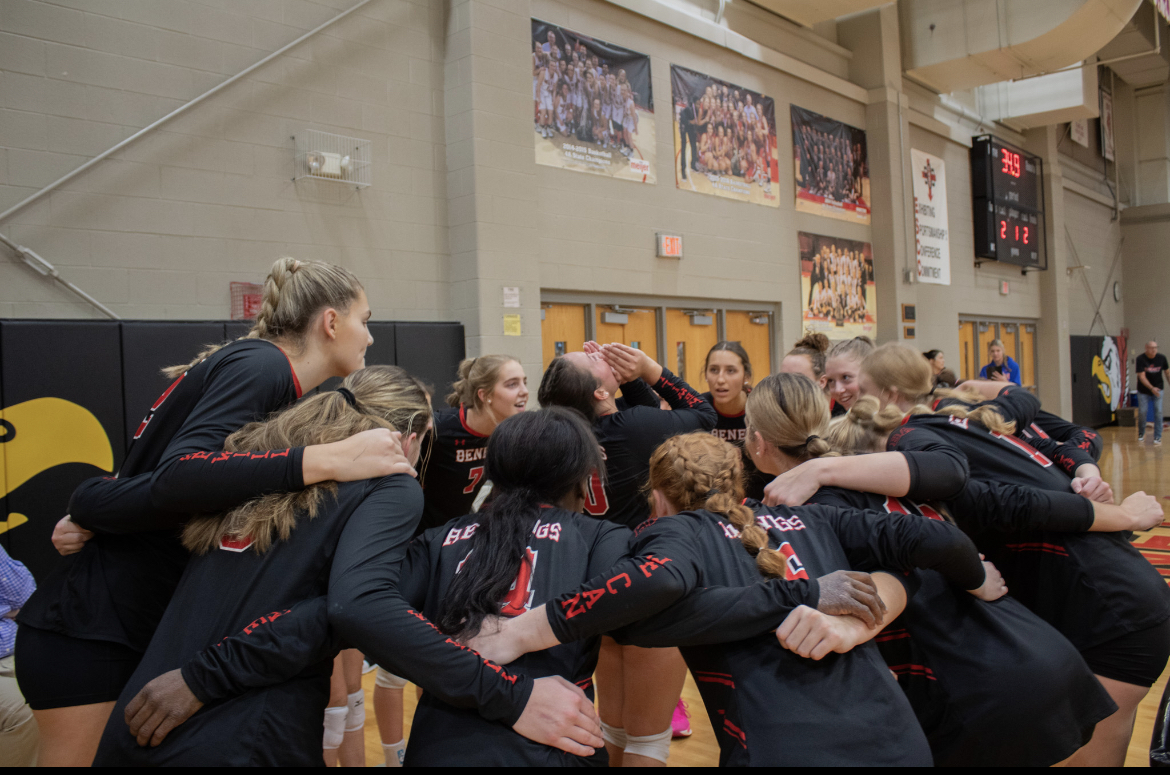
Benet Academy Girls' Volleyball 2023

Benet's boys' basketball team has set several state records, including a 102 home-game winning streak between November 26, 1975, and January 24, 1987. The streak ended when Benet lost to Naperville North High School, 47–46. The team compiled a 96 game in-conference winning streak from January 21, 1977, to February 24, 1984. The team recorded twelve consecutive seasons with at least 20 wins from 1975 to 1987, tied for the ninth longest streak in state history. The basketball team honors these school records by playing one home game each year in the Alumni Gym, where the streaks were recorded.

Benet's chess team, founded in 2012, has won every Far Side Suburban Chess Conference championship since the team's inception. In 2014 the chess team took second place at the IHSA state tournament.

=== Performing arts ===
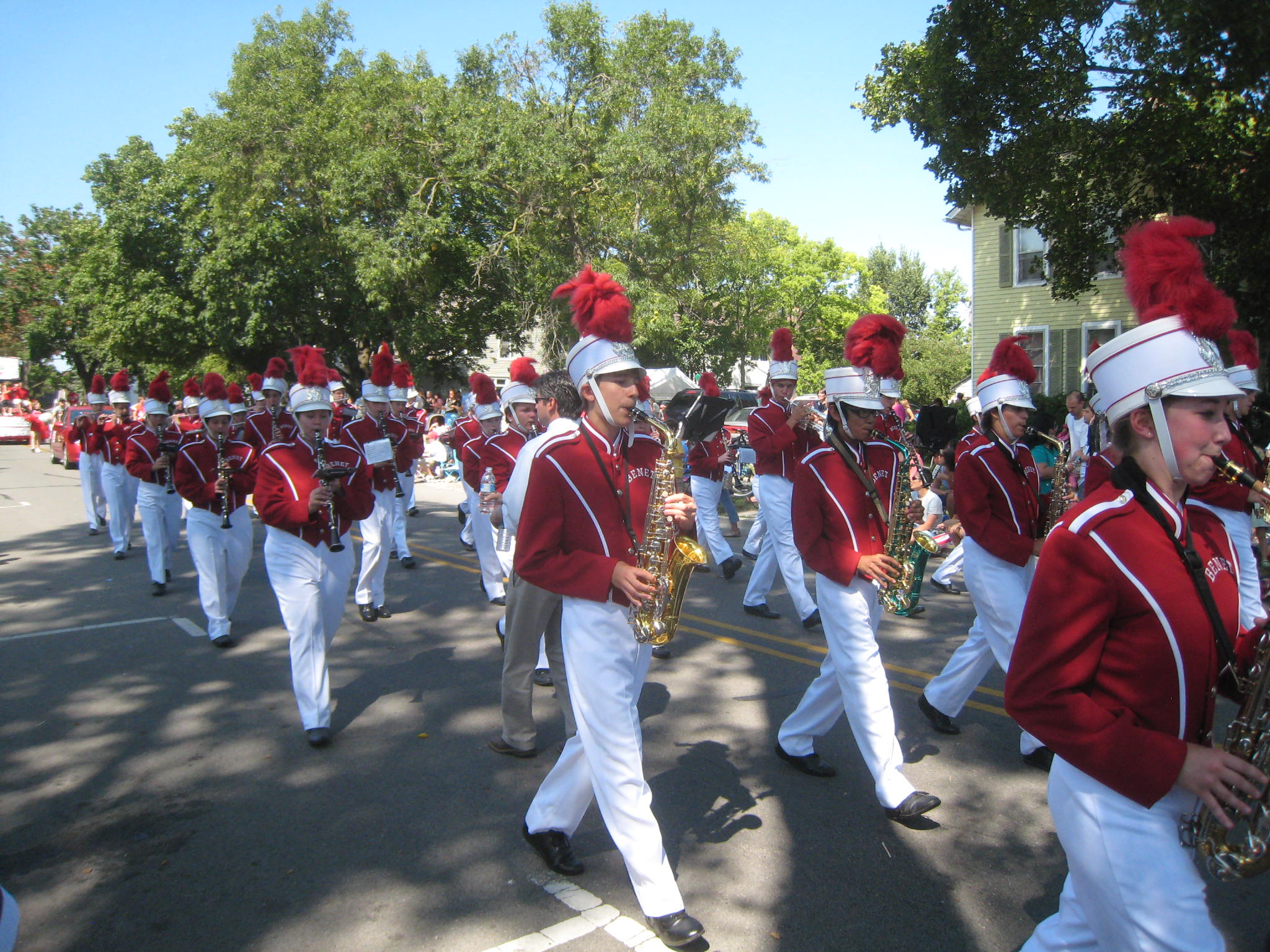
The Benet Academy Marching Redwings performing in the Naperville Last Fling Parade in 2008

The theater department has staged annual musicals since 1997. Shows have included 42nd Street, Bye Bye Birdie, Guys and Dolls, Hello, Dolly!, and Pippin. In 2000, the department began depicting works that were "not quite so fluffy and light", including Children of Eden, West Side Story, Fiddler on the Roof, The Pirates of Penzance, and Into the Woods. In 2006, the department celebrated its tenth anniversary of musical performances with a production of The Music Man.

Benet's band program, practically nonexistent in the late 1950s, was revitalized by director Andy Marchese in the mid-1960s, who introduced new uniforms, regularly scheduled concerts, and marching band trophies. Participation in the marching band also increased after the school became coeducational, since there were more musicians willing to play instruments male students saw as feminine. Out of 1,275 students at Benet in 1999–00, 130 were choir students and 115 were band students. Instrumental groups include two concert bands, a percussion ensemble, three jazz bands, a marching band, a pep band, and a string orchestra. In 1998 the pep band was one of eight schools chosen from a pool of 58 to perform at the state basketball tournament. In 2002, the school's symphonic band was one of three high school bands invited to play at the Illinois Music Educators Association All-State Conference in Peoria. Vocal music groups include five choirs, one of which is a student-led mass choir that participates in school liturgies.

=== Student organizations ===
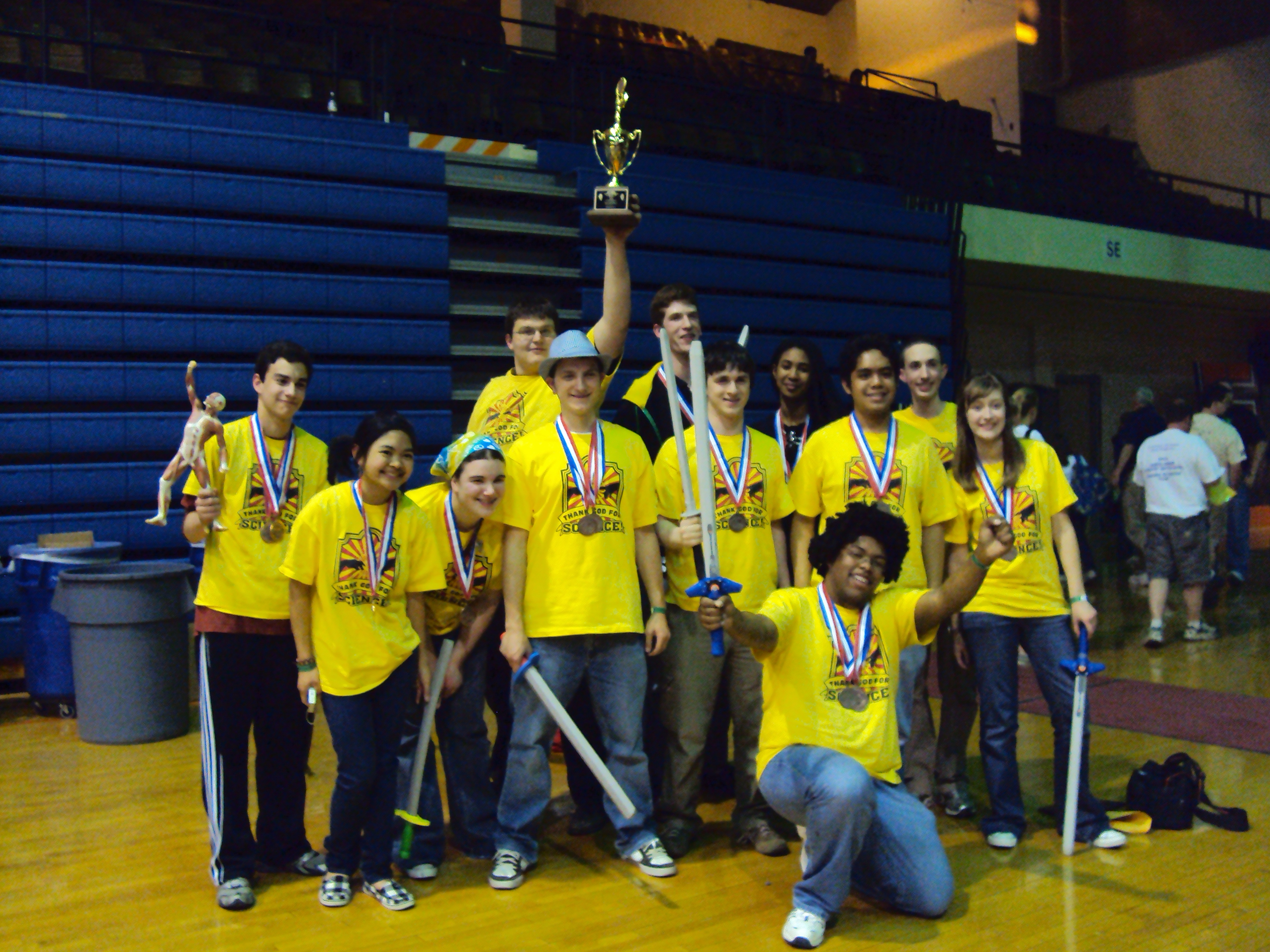
Members of the Benet Science Alliance team display their awards after the state Illinois Science Olympiad tournament in 2010

Student clubs and organizations include the National Honor Society, Model United Nations, and L.I.F.T. (Living in Faith and Truth), a campus ministry geared towards fostering students' Catholic faith. L.I.F.T. assists in coordinating several retreats held throughout the year, through which students are encouraged to reexamine their faith. Other special interest activities include medical club, foreign language clubs, investment club, scholastic bowl, a career exploration club, and many more.

Benet's Math Team finished in the top ten of its division each year from 2004 through 2015 in the state math competition sponsored by the Illinois Council of Teachers of Mathematics, coming in first in 2005 and 2012. Benet's Science Olympiad team won second place in its division at the state tournaments in 2008 and 2010. In February 2010, the Law Club participated in its first mock trial, sponsored by the Illinois State Bar Association, which is expected to become an annual event.

==== Student Government (SG) ====
Benet Academy’s student government serves as the most prominent organization in day-to-day student life. It is the largest organization by membership since every student is technically a member. SG at Benet is responsible for organizing all major student events, including the three major dances: Homecoming in the fall, open to sophomores through seniors, Turnabout in February where female students ask male students, and Prom in the spring, open only to juniors and seniors. SG also coordinates student sections at athletic events, choosing and publicizing game themes. SG’s largest undertaking is the annual Christmas Drive, a Benet tradition dating back several decades in the weeks leading up to Christmas break.

The president for the 2025-26 school year is Michael Francis, aided by Vice President Oresta Holubec.

=== Christmas Drive ===
The annual Christmas Drive takes place in December, during the two weeks prior to Christmas vacation. The fundraiser is a school-wide effort, coordinated by Student Government. The fundraising efforts are varied and creative; boys donate money to remain unshaven (a violation of school policy), the National Honor Society sells baked goods, the Mother's Club serves breakfast, and each class competes to gather the most pennies in the school-wide "penny wars." The Christmas Drive was featured in the cover story of the December 2010 issue of Christ is our Hope, the official magazine of the Diocese of Joliet. In the previous year the school had raised $54,500. The money was used to support a mission trip in Appalachia, and also to provide food, school supplies, blankets, and gifts to local families in the Chicago area. In 2022, the student body raised $101,336.

== Works cited ==
- Benet Academy (2010). "Curriculum Guide: 2010–2011" (PDF). Benet Academy. Archived from the original (PDF) on December 9, 2010.
- Buresh, Vitus (1985). The Procopian Chronicle. Lisle, Illinois: St. Procopius Abbey. OCLC 12682648.
- Čada, Joseph (1964). Czech-American Catholics, 1850–1920. Chicago: Benedictine Abbey Press, under the auspices of the Center for Slav Culture, St. Procopius College, Lisle, Illinois. OCLC 1882096.
- Mizera, Peter F. (1969). Czech Benedictines in America: 1877–1961. Lisle, Illinois: Center for Slav Culture, St. Procopius College. OCLC 3379383.
- Myers, Margaret C. (1968). A Follow-Up Study of the 1962–1966 Graduates of Sacred Heart Academy, Lisle, Illinois (Master of Science in Education thesis). Northern Illinois University. OCLC 21530553.
- Sacred Heart Monastery (1995). Sacred Heart Monastery, Lisle, Illinois, 1895–1995. Lisle, Illinois: Benedictine Sisters, Sacred Heart Monastery. OCLC 46986306.
