= Joseph M. Siegel =

Latin Catholic bishop (b. 1963)

His Excellency, The Most Reverend Joseph Mark Siegel
- Bishop of Evansville
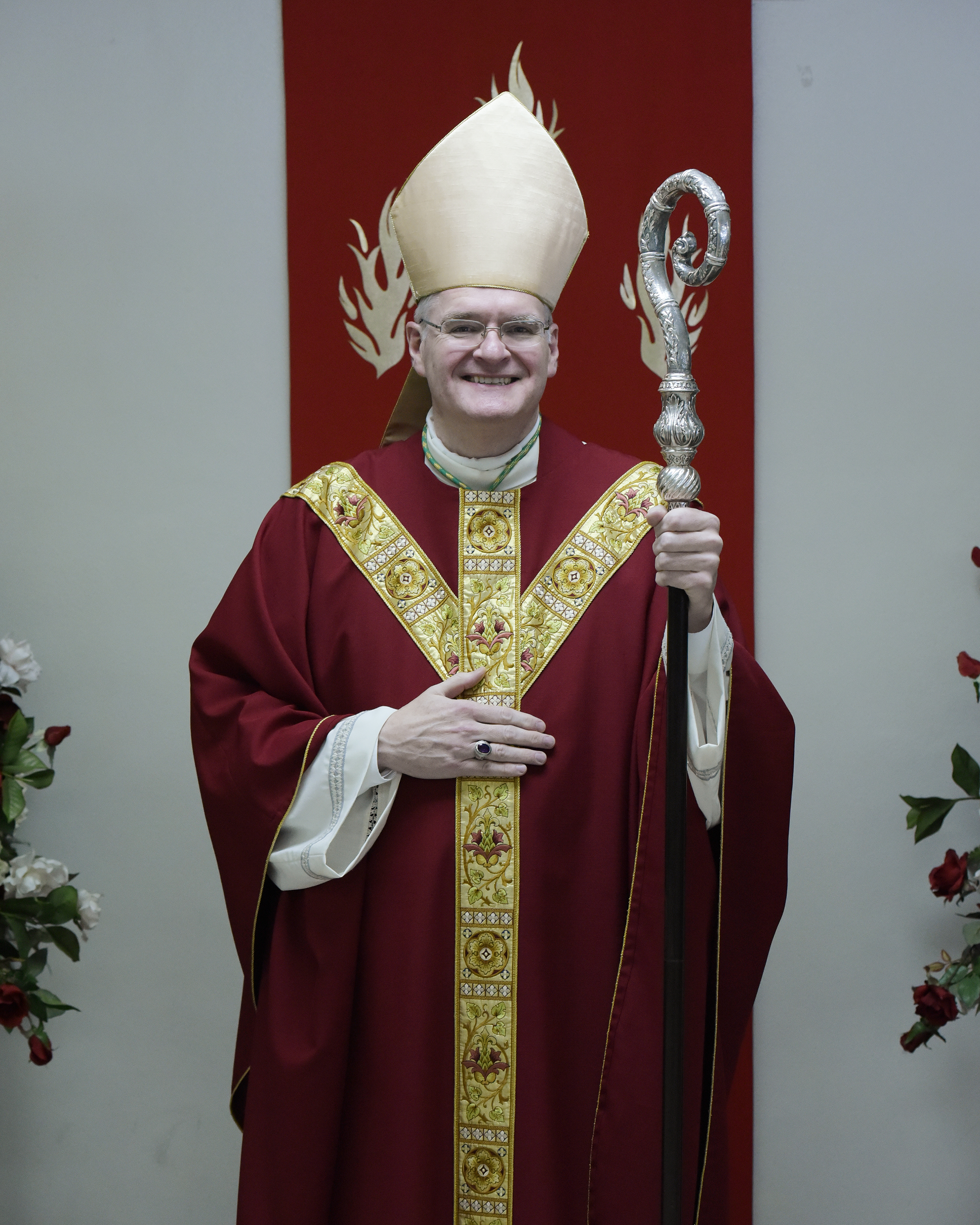
- See: Diocese of Evansville
- Appointed: October 18, 2017
- Installed: December 15, 2017
- Predecessor: Charles C. Thompson
- Previous post: Auxiliary Bishop of Joliet and Titular Bishop of Pupiana (2010-2017)

Orders
- Ordination: June 4, 1988 by Joseph Leopold Imesch
- Consecration: January 19, 2010 by J. Peter Sartain, Joseph Leopold Imesch and Frank Joseph Dewane

Personal details
- Born: July 18, 1963 (age 63) Joliet, Illinois, USA
- Denomination: Catholic Church
- Parents: Francis and Marie Siegel
- Education: Joliet Junior College; St. Meinrad Seminary College; Pontifical Gregorian University; Pontifical University of St. Thomas Aquinas; University of St. Mary of the Lake
- Motto: In te Domine speravi (I put my trust in you, Lord)

Styles of Joseph Mark Siegel
- Reference style: His Excellency; The Most Reverend
- Spoken style: Your Excellency
- Religious style: Bishop

Joseph Mark Siegel (born July 18, 1963) is an American prelate of the Catholic Church who has served as bishop of the Diocese of Evansville in Indiana since 2017. He previously served as auxiliary bishop of the Diocese of Joliet in Illinois from 2009 to 2017.

== Early life and education ==
The youngest of nine children, Joseph Siegel was born on July 18, 1963, in Joliet, Illinois, to Francis and Marie Siegel. He was raised on a farm in Lockport Township. He was baptized at the Cathedral of St. Raymond Nonnatus in Joliet and attended the parish grammar school.

Having decided to become a priest, Siegel in 1977 entered St. Charles Borromeo High School Seminary in Romeoville, Illinois, graduating in 1980. He then attended Joliet Junior College in Joliet, then continued his studies at St. Meinrad Seminary College in St. Meinrad, Indiana. Siegel graduated magna cum laude with a Bachelor of Arts degree in history from St. Meinrad in 1984.

Siegel completed his seminary formation at the Pontifical North American College in Rome between 1984 and 1988. He earned a Bachelor of Sacred Theology degree cum laude from the Pontifical Gregorian University in 1987, and continued his theological studies at the Pontifical University of St. Thomas Aquinas, both in Rome. Siegel was ordained to the diaconate by Cardinal William W. Baum on April 14, 1988, at St. Peter's Basilica in Rome.

== Ordination and ministry ==
Following his return to Illinois, Siegel was ordained to the priesthood for the Diocese of Joliet by Bishop Joseph L. Imesch at the Cathedral of Saint Raymond Nonnatus in Joliet on June 4, 1988. After his 1988 ordination, Siegel continued his studies in systematic theology at the University of St. Mary of the Lake in Mundelein, Illinois, earning a Licentiate of Sacred Theology in 1990.

After finishing in 1990 at St. Mary, the diocese assigned Siegel as parochial vicar at the following Illinois parishes:

- St. Isidore Parish in Bloomingdale (1990 to 1994)
- St. Mary Immaculate in Plainfield, (1994 to 1998);
- St. Mary Nativity in Joliet (1998 to 2000);
- Cathedral of St. Raymond Nonnatus, where he also served as master of ceremonies (2000 to 2004).

Siegel was appointed pastor of Visitation Parish in Elmhurst, Illinois, in 2004. He would remain there for the next six years. Siegel was a member of the presbyteral council for nine years, including three years as chair, and was appointed to the college of consultors. He also served as director of continuing formation for priests, a member of the vocation board, a member of the priest personnel board, and dean of Eastern Will County.

Within the Catholic Conference of Illinois, Siegel served on the executive committee as a priest representative and was chair of the Catholics for Life Department. He chaired the steering committee for the Joliet Year of the Eucharist and the eucharistic congress. Siegel is a member of the Bishops Respect Life Advisory Board.

Siegel is a fourth degree Knight of Columbus and a member of the Knights of the Holy Sepulchre. He was the state chaplain for the Knights of Columbus' Illinois State Council.

== Auxiliary Bishop of Joliet ==
Coat of arms as auxiliary bishop of Joliet

On October 28, 2009, Siegel was appointed as auxiliary bishop of Joliet and titular bishop of Pupiana by Pope Benedict XVI. He received his episcopal consecration on January 19, 2010, from Bishop J. Peter Sartain, with Bishops Joseph L. Imesch and Frank J. Dewane serving as co-consecrators, at the Cathedral of St. Raymond Nonnatus. He selected as his episcopal motto: In Te Domine Speravi.

Siegel remained pastor of Visitation Parish until June 2010, when Bishop J. Peter Sartain named him as, vicar general for the diocese. Siegel also served as diocesan administrator for several months after Sartain was installed as archbishop of the Archdiocese of Seattle.

== Bishop of Evansville ==
On October 18, 2017, Pope Francis appointed Siegel as the sixth bishop of Evansville. He was installed on Dec. 15, 2017, at St. Benedict Cathedral in Evansville.

The diocese released on February 22, 2019, a list of ten clerics in the diocese who faced credible accusations of sexual assault against minors.

== See also ==
- Catholic Church hierarchy
- Catholic Church in the United States
- Historical list of the Catholic bishops of the United States
- List of Catholic bishops of the United States
- Lists of patriarchs, archbishops, and bishops

== Episcopal succession ==
Catholic Church titles
Preceded by Charles C. Thompson	Bishop of Evansville; 2017–present	Incumbent
Preceded by –	Auxiliary Bishop of Joliet; 2009–2017	Succeeded by –
