= Raymond James Vonesh =

American Bishop

The Most Reverend Raymond J. Vonesh
- Auxiliary Bishop of Joliet in Illinois
- Church: Catholic Church
- See: Titular See of Vanariona
- In office: April 3, 1968 - May 7, 1991

Orders
- Ordination: May 3, 1941 by Samuel Stritch
- Consecration: April 3, 1968 by John Cody

Personal details
- Born: January 25, 1916 Cicero, Illinois
- Died: August 16, 1991 (aged 75) Mokena, Illinois

Raymond James Vonesh (January 25, 1916 – August 16, 1991) was an American Bishop of the Catholic Church. He served as an auxiliary bishop of the Diocese of Joliet in Illinois from 1968–1991.

== Early life and education ==
Born in Cicero, Illinois, Raymond Vonesh was educated at St. Leonard School, St. Philip High School in Chicago, Quigley Preparatory Seminary, and St. Mary of the Lake Seminary. He was ordained a priest for the Archdiocese of Chicago by Archbishop Samuel Stritch on May 3, 1941.

== Priesthood ==
After ordination, Vonesh served at Sacred Heart Church in Chicago until 1946 when he was assigned to Holy Name Cathedral. He studied canon law at the Gregorian University in Rome from 1947 to 1949. Vonesh became the notary and judge for the Archdiocesan Tribunal upon his return to Chicago. He was assigned as the procurator at St. Mary of the Lake Seminary in 1956. Bishop Romeo Blanchette of the Joliet diocese requested of Archbishop John Cody of Chicago a priest experienced in canon law to assist him at the Joliet chancery. Vonesh was sent to the Joliet diocese in 1967 and named vicar general.

== Auxiliary Bishop of Joliet ==
On January 5, 1968 Pope Paul VI appointed Vonesh as the Titular Bishop of Vanariona and Auxiliary Bishop of Joliet in Illinois. He was consecrated by John Cardinal Cody of Chicago on April 3, 1968. The principal co-consecrators were Bishops Romeo Blanchette of Joliet and Cletus F. O'Donnell of Madison. He continued to serve as an auxiliary bishop until his resignation was accepted by Pope John Paul II on May 7, 1991. During those years he served as pastor of St. Patrick`s Parish in Joliet and vicar for Hispanics and vicar for permanent deacons. He later moved to Holy Cross rectory in Joliet and then became temporary administrator of St. Walter`s Parish in Roselle from 1981–1982. He became chaplain for the Franciscan Sisters of the Sacred Heart in Mokena in June 1988. Vonesh died at the age of 75 on August 16, 1991. His funeral was held in the Cathedral of St. Raymond Nonnatus on August 21, 1991.
