= Roger Kaffer =

Latin Catholic Bishop

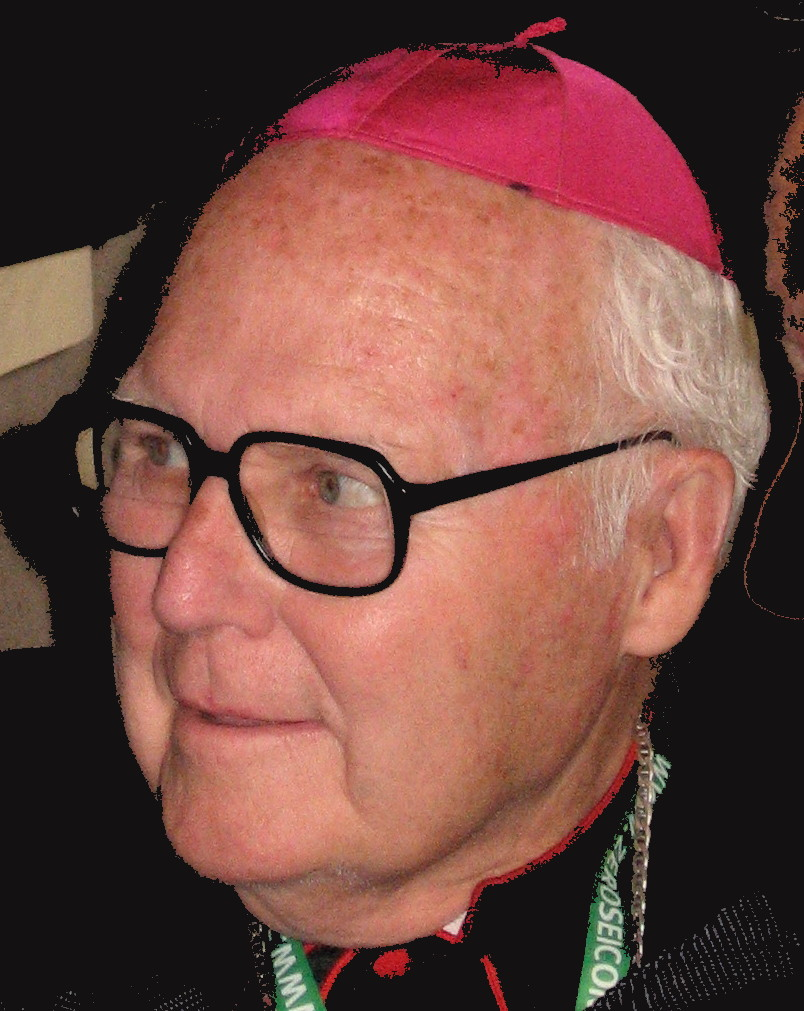
Roger L. Kaffer, former Auxiliary Bishop of the Diocese of Joliet

Roger Louis Kaffer (August 14, 1927 Joliet, Illinois – May 28, 2009 Joliet) was the American Auxiliary Bishop of the Catholic Diocese of Joliet in Illinois from 1985 until 2002.

Kaffer was born on August 14, 1927, to parents, Earl Louis Kaffer and Helen Ruth (nee McManus) Kaffer, in Joliet, Illinois. He was baptized in St. Raymond Parish in Joilet, and also attended the parish's Catholic elementary school. He graduated from Joliet Township High School in 1945.

Kaffer enrolled in Quigley Preparatory Seminary following his graduation from high school, before transferring to St. Mary of the Lake Seminary in Mundelein, Illinois. He was formally ordained as a Roman Catholic priest on May 1, 1954, by then Bishop Martin D. McNamara at the Cathedral of Saint Raymond Nonnatus in Joilet. His first assignment as a priest was to the St. Paul the Apostle Parish in Joilet as an associate pastor. He continued to work as a notary at that parish until 1956.

Kaffer was appointed the assistant chancellor of the Diocese of Joliet in 1958. In 1965, he completed his M.Ed. at DePaul University. Soon after completing his master's degree, Kaffer was appointed the first rector of the St. Charles Borromeo Seminary in Romeoville, Illinois. He also served on the seminary's board of directors from 1968 to 1974.

Father Roger Kaffer was named the new principal of Providence Catholic High school (New Lenox, Illinois) in 1970 and began a campaign to improve the academic standing of the school, and to improve transportation options for students traveling great distances. It was his practice to visit every family who had a child enrolled in the school. In 1971 the enrollment of Providence Catholic High school was 490 and soared to 785 by 1975 due to Father Kaffer's efforts.

In 1984, Kaffer obtained his doctorate in pastoral ministry from St. Mary of the Lake Seminary, now known as the University of Saint Mary of the Lake.

Kaffer was named temporary administrator of the Cathedral of Saint Raymond Nonnatus in January 1985. He was named a full rector of the Cathedral just one month later, in February 1985. Kaffer was also formally named the Titular Bishop of the Diocese of Dusa, which is located in North Africa, in 1985.

== Auxiliary bishop of Joilet ==
1985 proved to be an eventful year for Kaffer. Later that year, he was named the auxiliary bishop of Joliet. He was ordained by then Bishop Joseph Leopold Imesch on June 26, 1985, at the Cathedral of St. Raymond Nonnatus. He held the position of vicar general and vicar for priests in the Joilet diocese until 2002. Additionally, Kaffer served as the chairman of the Second Synod of Joliet from 1986 until 1989. He retired as auxiliary bishop in 2002, remaining auxiliary bishop emeritus thereafter.

Kaffer was appointed secretary for education for the Diocese of Joilet in March 2002. He also served as the Illinois state chaplain for the Knights of Columbus from 1993 until 2009.

Kaffer suffered a heart attack and a diagnosis of prostate cancer in October 2008. He resided at the Our Lady of the Angels Retirement Home in Joliet from 2008 until 2009.

Bishop Kaffer died May 28, 2009, in Joliet, Illinois, at the age of 81. His body was allowed to lie in state at Cathedral of St. Raymond in his native Joliet before his funeral.
