= Papia =

Papia may refer to:

- Pavia, city in northern Italy
- Pupiana, Italia curiate name of a Latin Catholic titular bishopric in Africa proconsularis
- Papia gens, an ancient Roman family
