= Cenculiana =

Cenculiana was a Roman era town in Roman North Africa.

Cenculiana, in today's Tunisia, is also the seat of an ancient episcopal see of the Roman province of Byzacena. The Bishop was a suffran of Carthage. Only one bishop of the town is known, the Catholic Ianuarius, who took part in the Council of Carthage (411), which saw gathered together the Catholics and Donatist bishops from across Africa. When Vandal king Huneric called a synod in 484 the seat appears to be vacant. Today Cenculiana survives as titular bishopric, and the current bishop is Dennis E. Spies, Auxiliary To The Bishop of Joliet-In-Illinois.
