= J. Peter Sartain =

Catholic archbishop

His Excellency, The Most Reverend James Peter Sartain
- Archbishop Emeritus of Seattle
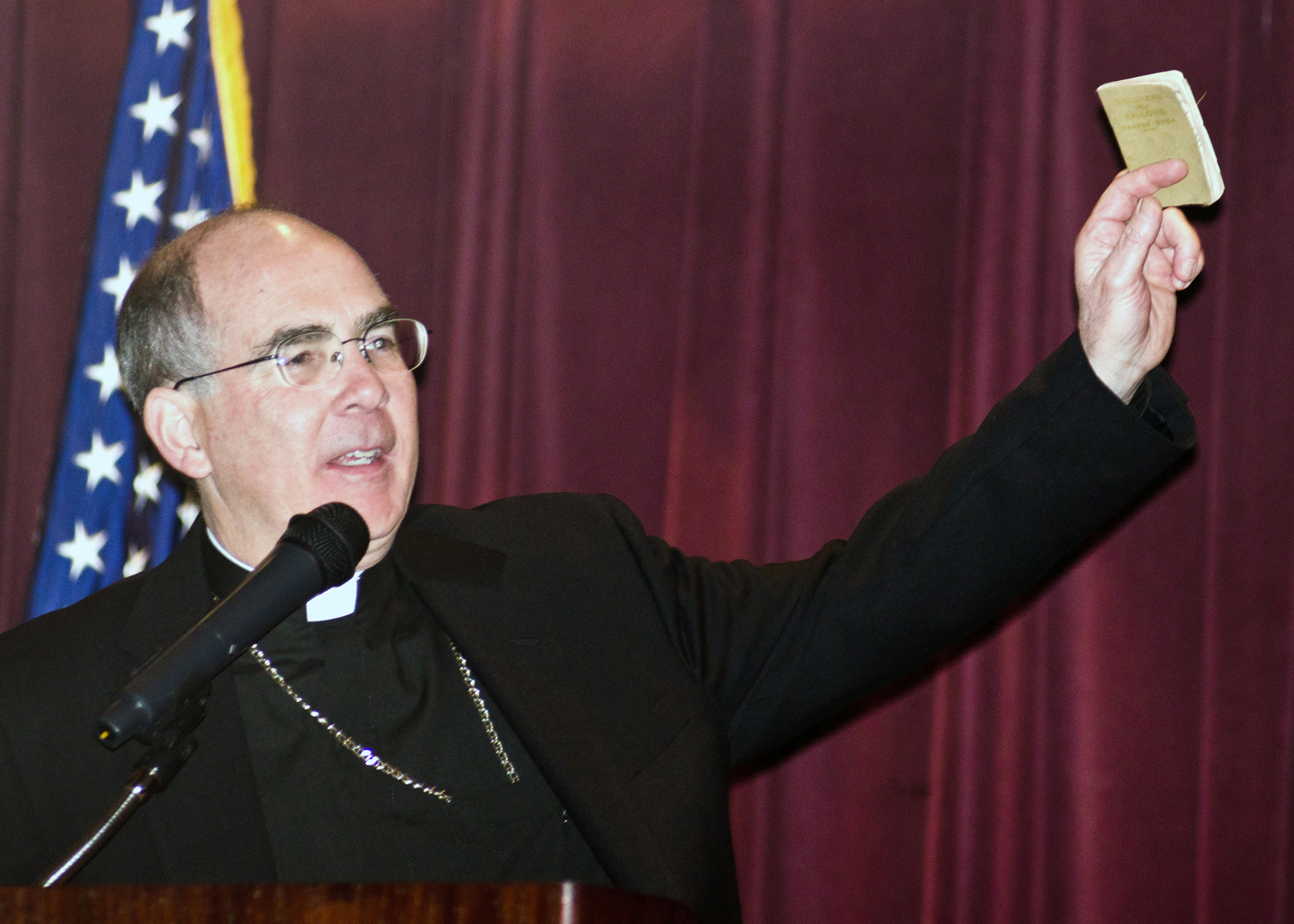
- Archbishop Sartain in 2012
- Archdiocese: Seattle
- Appointed: September 16, 2010
- Installed: December 1, 2010
- Retired: September 3, 2019
- Predecessor: Alexander Joseph Brunett
- Successor: Paul D. Etienne
- Previous posts: Bishop of Joliet (2006–2010); Bishop of Little Rock (2000–2006)

Orders
- Ordination: July 15, 1978 by Carroll Thomas Dozier
- Consecration: March 6, 2000 by Eusebius J. Beltran, J. Terry Steib, and Andrew Joseph McDonald

Personal details
- Born: June 6, 1952 (age 74) Memphis, Tennessee, USA
- Denomination: Roman Catholic Church
- Motto: Of you my heart has spoken

Styles of James Peter Sartain
- Reference style: His Excellency; The Most Reverend
- Spoken style: Your Excellency
- Religious style: Archbishop

Ordination history of J. Peter Sartain
History
Episcopal consecration
- Consecrated by: Eusebius J. Beltran
Episcopal succession
Bishops consecrated by J. Peter Sartain as principal consecrator
- Joseph M. Siegel: January 19, 2010
- Daniel Henry Mueggenborg: May 31, 2017

James Peter Sartain (born June 6, 1952) is an American Catholic prelate who served as Archbishop of Seattle from 2010 to 2019. He previously served as Bishop of Little Rock from 2000 to 2006 and as Bishop of Joliet from 2006 to 2010.

== Biography ==
=== Early life ===
Peter Sartain was born on June 6, 1952, in Memphis, Tennessee, to Joseph Martin ("Pete") and Catherine (née Poole) Sartain. He is the youngest of five children as well as the only boy. His father served in the U.S. Navy in the Pacific Theater during World War II. Raised in the Whitehaven neighborhood of Memphis, Peter Sartain received his early education at the parochial school of St. Paul the Apostle Parish, and graduated from Bishop Byrne High School in Memphis in 1970.

Sartain studied chemistry at Memphis State University for one year before transferring to St. Meinrad College in St. Meinrad, Indiana, earning a Bachelor of Arts degree in English in 1974. Sartain then went to Rome to study at the Pontifical University of St. Thomas Aquinas, receiving a Bachelor of Sacred Theology degree in 1977.

=== Priesthood ===
On July 15, 1978, Sartain was ordained to the priesthood for the Diocese of Memphis by Bishop Carroll Dozier at the Cathedral of the Immaculate Conception in Memphis. Returning to his studies in Rome, Sartain was in St. Peter's Square when the newly elected Pope John Paul II emerged from the papal conclave of October 1978. Sartain earned a Licentiate of Sacred Theology, with a specialization in sacramental theology, from the Pontifical University of St. Anselmo in 1979.

After returning to Memphis, Sartain was appointed as associate pastor of Our Lady of Sorrows Parish, where he remained for two years. He then served as director of vocations, as chancellor, as moderator of the curia, as vicar for clergy, as a high school chaplain, and as a judge with the diocesan marriage tribunal. From 1992 to 2000, he served as pastor of St. Louis Parish in Memphis and vicar general of the diocese. Sartain served as diocesan administrator (1992–93) after Bishop Daniel M. Buechlein was named to head the Archdiocese of Indianapolis.

=== Bishop of Little Rock ===
On January 4, 2000, Sartain was appointed the sixth bishop of Little Rock by Pope John Paul II. He received his episcopal consecration on March 6, 2000, from Archbishop Eusebius J. Beltran, with Bishops J. Terry Steib and Andrew Joseph McDonald serving as co-consecrators. Sartain was the first priest of the Diocese of Memphis to become a bishop. He selected as his episcopal motto: "Of You My Heart Has Spoken" Psalms 27:8.

Due to the increasing Hispanic population in Arkansas, Sartain took a course in Spanish in San Antonio, Texas, in 2001, and established Hispanic ministries throughout the state. He also ordained Arkansas's first Mexican-born priest and deacon. He worked to increase vocations; the diocese had ten seminarians and no ordinations in 2000, but fifteen seminarians and two ordinations in 2005. In 2005, Sartain led more than 5,000 Catholics in a bilingual eucharistic congress. During his tenure, the Catholic population in Arkansas rose from 90,600 to over 107,000.

=== Bishop of Joliet ===
On May 16, 2006, Sartain was appointed as bishop of Joliet by Pope Benedict XVI. He was installed on June 27, 2006, in the Cathedral of St. Raymond Nonnatus in Joliet.

Sartain faced scrutiny while bishop of Joliet due to his handling of the sexual abuse crisis. During his installation as archbishop of Seattle, the Survivors Network of those Abused by Priests (SNAP) organized a protest against Sartain's installation. The protest originated from Sartain's decision as bishop of Joliet to ordain Alejandro Flores in 2009, even though diocesan officials had raised concerns over Flores' viewing of male pornography. Shortly after his ordination, Flores was convicted of sexually abusing a boy and sentenced to four years in prison in 2010. SNAP said that Sartain's decision to ordain Flores and other such individuals showed that should not be entrusted as bishop. In response, Sartain claims that he reported priests such as Flores as soon as he heard about abuse.

=== Archbishop of Seattle ===
On September 16, 2010, Sartain was appointed as archbishop of Seattle by Benedict XVI, succeeding Archbishop Alexander Brunett. Sartain was installed on December 1, 2010, in St. James Cathedral in Seattle. In November 2011, Sartain was elected secretary of the United States Conference of Catholic Bishops (USCCB); he began a three-year term in November 2012. His position also made him chair of the USCCB Committee on Priorities and Plans.

In April 2012, the Vatican announced the appointment of Sartain to oversee a review of the Leadership Conference of Women Religious, a prominent umbrella group for nuns in the United States. It involved reviewing and changing the group's laws, programs and practices to correct practices that the Vatican believed were "incompatible with the Catholic faith."

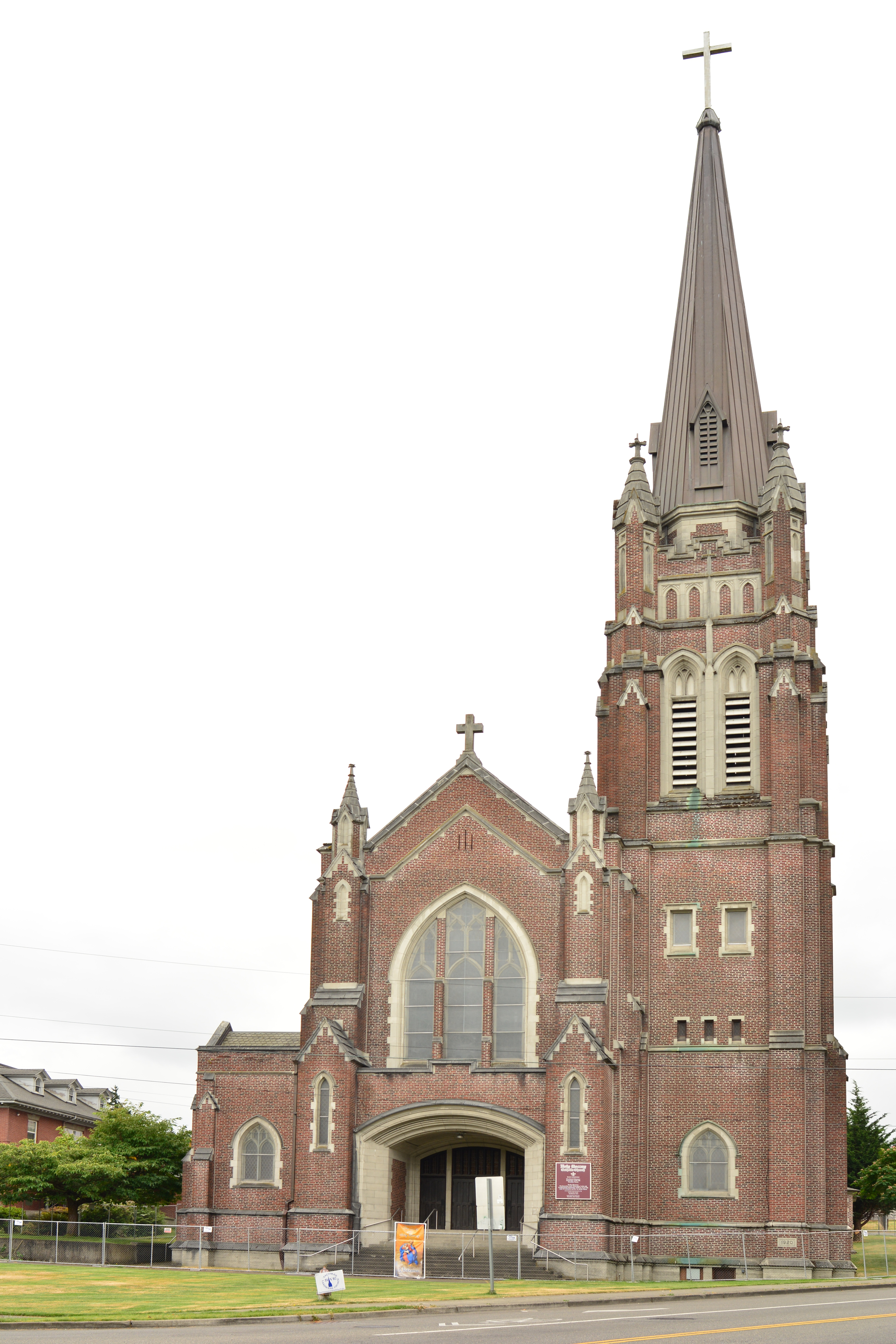
Holy Rosary Church, Tacoma, Washington (2020)

On June 7, 2019, Sartain installed Paul D. Etienne, then archbishop of Anchorage, as coadjutor archbishop for the archdiocese. In August 2019, Sartain ordered the demolition of Holy Rosary Church in Tacoma, Washington, a building that has been on the City of Tacoma's Register of Tacoma Places since 1975. As of 2026, Holy Rosary Church is still standing.

=== Retirement and legacy ===
Pope Francis accepted Sartain's resignation as archbishop of Seattle on September 3, 2019. He was reported to be in poor health, which prompted the pope to accept his early retirement.

== Viewpoints ==
In April 2012, Sartain urged parishes in the archdiocese to collect signatures to place Referendum 74 on the November ballot. The referendum sought to repeal the State of Washington's newly enacted same-sex marriage statute. Sartain made this statement:

"The word 'marriage' isn't simply a label that can be attached to different types of relationships, Instead, 'marriage' reflects a deep reality – the reality of the unique, fruitful, lifelong union that is only possible between a man and a woman. There is nothing else like it, and it can't be defined or made into something that it isn't...Marriage can only be between a man and a woman because of its unique ends, purpose and place in society."

In the referendum, the voters rejected the appeal of the statute.

Catholic Church titles
Preceded by Andrew Joseph McDonald	Bishop of Little Rock; 2000–2006	Succeeded by Anthony Taylor
Preceded by Joseph Leopold Imesch	Bishop of Joliet; 2006–2010	Succeeded by R. Daniel Conlon
Preceded by Alexander Joseph Brunett	Archbishop of Seattle; 2010–2019	Succeeded by Paul D. Etienne
