= Chesterton Academy of the Holy Family =

Catholic high school in Lisle, Illinois, USA

Coordinates: 41.7921°N 87.9940°W

Chesterton Academy of The Holy Family is a Catholic high school located in Lisle, Illinois. The school is affiliated with the Roman Catholic Diocese of Joliet in Illinois.

A cardiologist named Sean Tierney co-founded the school in Downers Grove, Illinois, along with local business owner, Brenie Bowles. The school, which uses the curriculum of the Chesterton Academy in Minnesota, opened on August 24, 2015. The curriculum intentionally does not emphasize technology in the classroom, believing that students perform better with traditional learning materials. As of 2018 The school has many athletic teams, which compete in the IHSA, including girls' volleyball, boys' and girls' soccer and boys' and girls' basketball. In 2018–2019, their men's rugby team had their debut season.
