= Pupiana =

Pupiana was an ancient city and former bishopric in present-day Tunisia. It is currently a Latin Catholic titular see.

== History ==
Pupiana was located near the modern Mra-Mita, Ain-Ouassel. It was important enough in the Roman province of Africa proconsularis to become a suffragan of its capital's Metropolitan Archbishopric Carthage, but faded.

== Titular see ==
The diocese was nominally restored as Pupiana, temporarily renamed Papiana in 1923–1929; the Italian curiate form is Papia.

It has had the following incumbents, of the lowest (episcopal) rank :

- Igino Nuti, Friars Minor (O.F.M.) (1921.12.20 – 1966.04.21)
- Jan Nowicki (1968.03.23 – 1973.08.14)
- Marian Jozef Rechowicz (1973.12.31 – 1983.09.28)
- Henry Apaloryamam Ssentongo (1988.12.15 – 1992.03.30)
- Virgil Bercea (1994.07.20 – 1996.11.06)
- Oscar Julio Vian Morales, Salesians (S.D.B.) (1996.11.30 – 2007.04.19), as Apostolic Vicar of El Petén (Guatemala) (1996.11.30 – 2007.04.19), later Metropolitan Archbishop of Los Altos, Quetzaltenango–Totonicapán (Guatemala) (2007.04.19 – 2010.10.02), Metropolitan Archbishop of Guatemala (2010.10.02 – 2013.04.25), restyled Metropolitan Archbishop of Santiago de Guatemala (Guatemala) (2013.04.25 – ...)
- Otto Separy (2007.07.02 – 2009.06.09)
- Joseph M. Siegel (2009.10.28 – ...), Auxiliary Bishop of Joliet (USA)
