= Illinois Council of Teachers of Mathematics =

Illinois educators

- Formation: 1949
- President: Annie Forest
- Affiliations: National Council of Teachers of Mathematics, National Council of Supervisors of Mathematics
- Revenue: $194,411 (2017)
- Website: ictm.org

The Illinois Council of Teachers of Mathematics (ICTM) is an organization of mathematics educators in the US state of Illinois. An affiliate of the National Council of Teachers of Mathematics and the National Council of Supervisors of Mathematics, the ICTM was founded in 1949 with 90 members.

== Professional Activities ==
The ICTM is involved in a number of professional activities, including:

- Hosting conferences on math education
- Hosting webinars for professional development
- Publishing its journal, Illinois Mathematics Teacher.
- Offering scholarships to college students. In 2017, the ICTM gave $7,500 in scholarships.

== Math Contests ==
The ICTM offers several math competitions for primary and secondary school students in Illinois.

=== Grade School Contest ===
The Grade School Contest is a series of three tests that are given at elementary schools. Each grade level (3-8) competes in its own division. The contest has two components: an individual competition and a team competition. The team competition consists of five student teams who work on 20 questions in 25 minutes. There is no limit to the number of teams that a school may enter. The individual competition is an eight question, 20 minute exam to be completed by each competitor individually. The use of calculators during the contest is encouraged. The top two team scores and top ten individual scores contribute to each school's total score.

=== Algebra Contest ===
The Algebra Contest is an individual, 60 minute, 20 question contest for elementary and junior high school students. Each school can submit as many competitors as it wishes. The ten highest individual scores in each school contributes to the school's total score, and the top ten individuals and top ten schools receive special recognition from the ICTM.

=== High School Contest ===
Started in 1981, the High School Contest consists of a number of team and individual events, with a regional competition being held in late February and the state competition being held in late April or early May. Schools are separated into divisions by enrollment.

==== Events ====
Events Summary†
| Event | Levels | Description | Team Make-Up | Scoring |
|---|---|---|---|---|
| Written | Algebra I (freshmen), Geometry (sophomores), Algebra II (juniors), Pre-Calculus (seniors) | Students individually solve 20 questions in 50 minutes with the use of calculators. | 1-6 competitors, of an appropriate grade level | Each correct answer is worth two points for a maximum score of 40 points per person; the team score is the top four individual scores per team, for a maximum score of 160 points per team. |
| 8 Person Team | Freshman-Sophomore, Junior-Senior | As a group, students solve 20 questions in 20 minutes without the use of calculators. | 1-8 competitors; no more than four may be sophomores for the freshman-sophomore level, no more than four may be seniors for the junior-senior level. | Each correct answer is worth five points, for a maximum score of 100 points per team. |
| Calculator Team | All compete in one level. | As a group, students solve 20 questions in 20 minutes, with special emphasis on the use of calculators. | 1-5 competitors: one freshman, one sophomore, one junior, and two seniors | Each correct answer is worth five points, for a maximum score of 100 points per team. |
| 2 Person Team | Freshman-Sophomore, Junior-Senior | In a pair, students work on ten questions one at a time, with a three-minute time limit on each question. Teams compete directly with one another, and emphasis is placed on accuracy and speed over others. No calculators are permitted for questions 1–5; calculators are allowed for questions 6-10. | 1-2 competitors, of an appropriate grade level | Each correct answer is worth six, four, or three points, depending on if the answer was submitted in the first, second, or third minutes, respectively. A two-point bonus is given to the first team to get the answer right. This gives a maximum possible team score of 80. |
| Oral Competition | All compete in one level. | In a pair, students prepare a response for ten minutes with the aid of calculators and reference texts, then present their solutions for seven minutes. An additional three minutes are used for extemporaneous questions. | 1-2 competitors of any level. | Each of two judges awards up to thirteen points for knowledge, eight points for presentation, and four points for extemporaneous questions, giving a maximum possible score of 50. |
| Relay Competition (state finals only) | Freshman-Sophomore, Junior-Senior | There are three rounds, with one question per team member per round. Sitting in a line, each student passes their answer to the next student once they have solved their problem; the answers from earlier competitors are part of the problem statement of later competitors. Calculators are permitted. | 1-4 competitors; no more than two may be sophomores for the freshman-sophomore level, no more than two may be seniors for the junior-senior level. | Each correct answer is worth two points. In the case that all four answers are correct, bonus points are given for teams that submit their answers in the first three minutes (five points) and in the first five minutes (three points), giving a maximum score of thirteen points per round, and 39 total points per team. |

†In all cases, a member of a lower grade may substitute for a member of a higher grade. For example, freshmen, sophomores, and juniors may all compete in the Algebra II Written competition, but not seniors.

Each school can have a maximum of one team per level per event, with the exception of the relay competition, in which schools are permitted a maximum of two teams per level per event. This gives a maximum possible team score of 1306 at the state finals, and a maximum score of 1150 at the regional competition.
