= Romeo Roy Blanchette =

American prelate

His Excellency, The Most Reverend Romeo Roy Blanchette
- Bishop emeritus of Joliet in Illinois
- See: Diocese of Joliet in Illinois
- In office: 1966 to 1979
- Predecessor: Martin Dewey McNamara
- Successor: Joseph Leopold Imesch
- Previous posts: Auxiliary Bishop of Joliet (1965 to 1966); Titular Bishop of Maxita

Orders
- Ordination: April 3, 1937 by George Mundelein
- Consecration: April 3, 1965 by Egidio Vagnozzi

Personal details
- Born: January 6, 1913 Kankakee County, Illinois, US
- Died: January 10, 1982 (aged 69) Joliet, Illinois, US
- Education: St. Mary of the Lake Seminary; Pontifical Gregorian University
- Motto: Kyrie Eleison (O Lord, have mercy)

Styles of Romeo Roy Blanchette
- Reference style: His Excellency; The Most Reverend
- Spoken style: Your Excellency
- Religious style: Bishop

Romeo Roy Blanchette (January 6, 1913 – January 10, 1982) was an American prelate of the Roman Catholic Church. He served as bishop of the Diocese of Joliet in Illinois from 1966 to 1979. He previously served as auxiliary bishop of the same diocese from 1965 to 1966.

== Biography ==
=== Early life ===
Romeo Blanchette was born on January 6, 1913, in Kankakee County, Illinois, to Oscar and Josephine (née Langlois) Blanchette. After attending Archbishop Quigley Preparatory Seminary in Chicago from 1928 to 1931, he studied at St. Mary of the Lake Seminary in Mundelein, Illinois, receiving a Bachelor of Arts degree in 1934.

=== Priesthood ===
Blanchette was ordained to the priesthood for the Archdiocese of Chicago by Cardinal George Mundelein on April 3, 1937, upon the recommendation of rector Reynold Henry Hillenbrand. He continued his studies in Rome at the Pontifical Gregorian University, earning a Licentiate of Canon Law in 1939. Blanchette served as a notary of the matrimonial court for the archdiocese. (1938–1949). When the Diocese of Joliet was erected in 1949, Bishop Martin McNamara made him chancellor there. In 1950, Blanchette was named vicar general of the diocese and a domestic prelate.

=== Auxiliary Bishop and Bishop of Joliet ===
On February 8, 1965, Blanchette was appointed as an auxiliary bishop of the Diocese of Joliet and titular bishop of Maxita by Pope Paul VI. He received his episcopal consecration at the Cathedral of Saint Raymond Nonnat in Joliet, Illinois, on April 3, 1965, from Archbishop Egidio Vagnozzi, with Bishops William Aloysius O'Connor and Ernest John Primeau serving as co-consecrators. Blanchette attended the fourth session of the Second Vatican Council in Rome in 1965

Following the death of Bishop McNamara, Blanchette was named by Pope Paul as the second bishop of Joliet on July 19, 1966.

=== Retirement and legacy ===
On January 30, 1979, Pope John Paul II accepted Blanchette's resignation as bishop of Joliet after he was diagnosed with Lou Gehrig's disease. Romeo Blanchette died of that disease at St. Joseph's Hospital in Joliet on January 10, 1982, at age 69.

In a 2015 lawsuit brought against the diocese by sexual abuse victims, it was revealed that Blanchette ignored warnings about the behavior of certain seminarians. The diocese settled with the victims for over $4 million.

- He allowed the ordination of Lawrence Gibbs in 1973, despite complaints about his behavior from administrators at Saint Mary of the Lake Seminary. Gibbs eventually molested 14 boys.
- Blanchette allowed James Nowak to be ordained, despite knowing that the Capuchin Order had dismissed him due to his failure to keep his vow of chastity. Nowak eventually abused eight children.

Catholic Church titles
Preceded by Martin Dewey McNamara	Bishop of Joliet in Illinois; 1966—1979	Succeeded by Joseph Leopold Imesch
