= Diocese of Joliet =

Latin Catholic jurisdiction in the US

Diocese of Joliet in Illinois Diœcesis Joliettensis in Illinois

Catholic
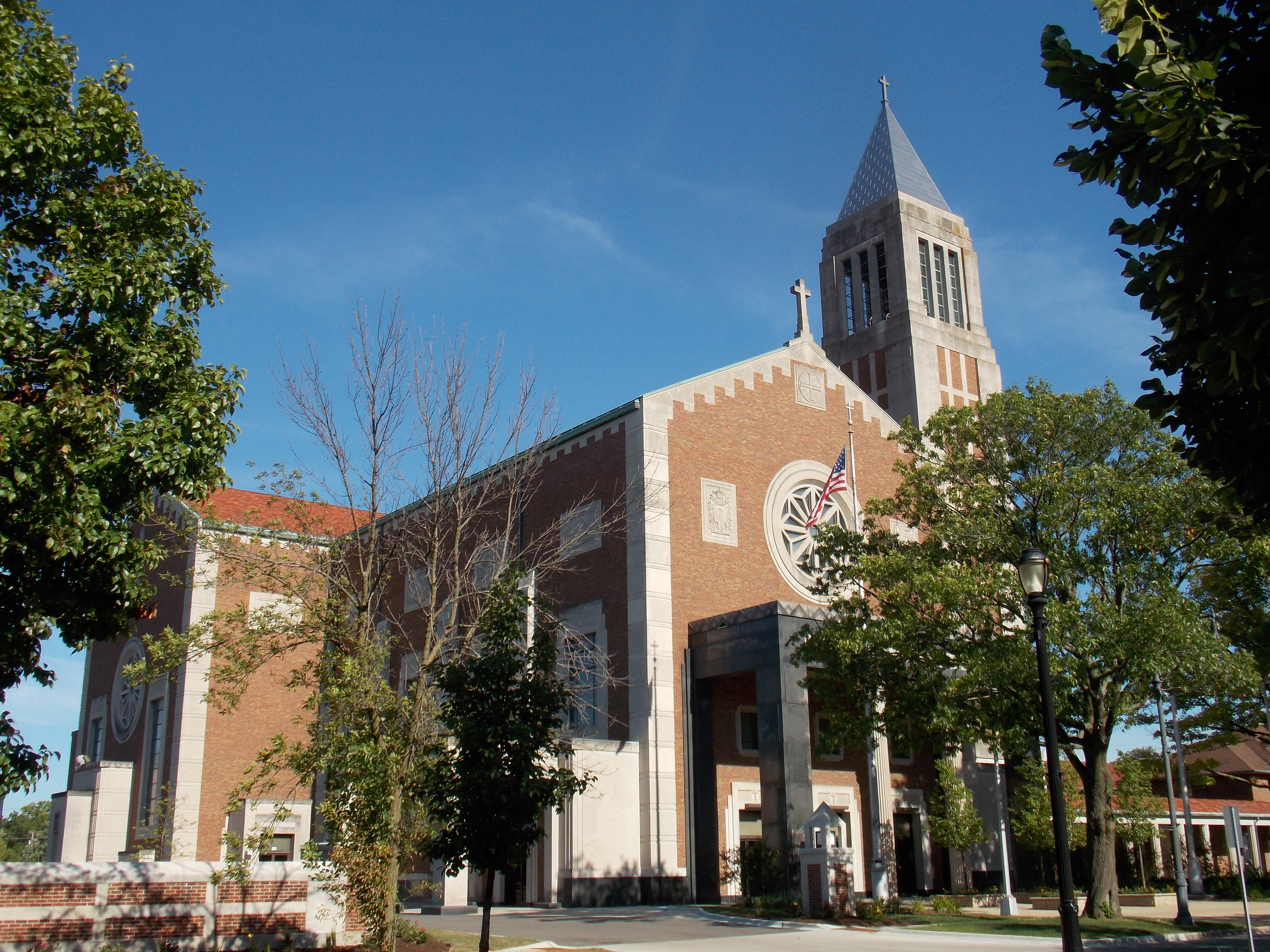
- Cathedral of St. Raymond Nonnatus

- Coat of arms

Location
- Country: United States
- Episcopal conference: USCCB
- Ecclesiastical region: Region VII
- Ecclesiastical province: Chicago
- Metropolitan: Chicago
- Headquarters: Crest Hill, Illinois
- Coordinates: 41°34′59″N 88°07′14″W

Statistics
- Area: 4,218 sq mi (10,920 km^{2})
- Population: Total; Catholics: (as of 2023); 1,961,747; 520,148 (26.5%)
- Parishes: 117
- Schools: 52

Information
- Denomination: Catholic Church
- Sui iuris church: Latin Church
- Rite: Roman Rite
- Established: December 11, 1948 (77 years ago)
- Cathedral: Cathedral of St. Raymond Nonnatus
- Patron saint: St. Francis Xavier

Current leadership
- Pope: Leo XIV
- Bishop: Brendan J. Cahill
- Metropolitan Archbishop: Blase J. Cupich
- Auxiliary Bishops: Dennis E. Spies
- Bishops emeritus: R. Daniel Conlon

Map
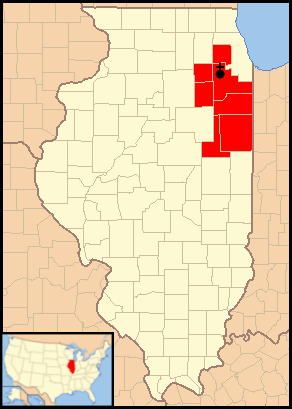

Website
- diojoliet.org

The Diocese of Joliet in Illinois (Latin: Diœcesis Joliettensis in Illinois) is a diocese of the Catholic Church in Illinois in the United States. It is a suffragan diocese of the metropolitan Archdiocese of Chicago. It was created in 1948, branching from the Archdiocese of Chicago. The mother church of the diocese is the Cathedral of St. Raymond Nonnatus in Joliet.

== Territory ==
The Diocese of Joliet in Illinois comprises the City of Joliet and its surrounding counties: DuPage, Ford, Grundy, Iroquois, Kankakee, Kendall and Will.

== History ==
=== Early history ===
During the seventeenth century, present day Illinois was part of the French colony of New France. The Diocese of Quebec, which had jurisdiction over the colony, sent numerous French missionaries to the region. After the British took control of New France in 1763, the Archdiocese of Quebec retained jurisdiction in the Illinois area. In 1776, the new United States claimed sovereignty over the area of Illinois. After the American Revolution ended in 1783, Pope Pius VI erected in 1784 the Prefecture Apostolic of the United States, encompassing the entire territory of the new nation. In 1785, Bishop John Carroll sent his first missionary to Illinois. Pius VI created the Diocese of Baltimore, the first diocese in the United States, to replace the prefecture apostolic in 1789.

With the creation of the Diocese of Bardstown in Kentucky in 1810, supervision of the Illinois missions shifted there. In 1827, the new bishop of the Diocese of Saint Louis assumed jurisdiction in the western half of the new state of Illinois. In 1834, the Vatican erected the Diocese of Vincennes, which included both Indiana and eastern Illinois. With the creation of the Diocese of Chicago in 1843, all of Illinois was transferred there from the Dioceses of St. Louis and Vincennes.

The construction of the Illinois and Michigan Canal in northeast Illinois during the 1830s and 1840s attracted many Irish Catholic immigrants into the Joliet area. The Diocese of Chicago assigned the priest John Plunkett to minister to the workers there. He established St. Patrick Church in 1838, the first church in the Joliet area.The first Catholic parish in DuPage County was St. Raphael’s, founded in 1846 in Napierville. Today it is Saints Peter and Paul Parish.

With the industrialization of Illinois and the emergence of Chicago as an important center of commerce, more Catholic immigrants moved into northern Illinois. The Diocese of Chicago was forced to build new churches and missions in the Joliet area. In Kankakee, the pastor of St. Rose Parish founded the Emergency Hospital in 1897, the first one in that town. Today it is Ascension St. Mary of Kankakee Hospital.

In 1920, the Sisters of Saint Francis of Mary Immaculate founded New College in Joliet. It is now the University of Saint Francis.St. Joan of Arc Parish was founded in Lisle in 1924.

=== Diocese of Joliet in Illinois ===
In 1948, Pope Pius XII established the Diocese of Joliet in Illinois, removing its territory from the Archdiocese of Chicago, to meet the demands of the exponential growth of Catholicism in the region. He named Martin McNamara of Chicago as the first bishop. McNamara selected St. Raymond's Church in Joliet as the cathedral for the new diocese. However, by 1950 the 540-seat cathedral had proven inadequate for the needs of the diocese. McNamara began planning a new facility. He consecrated the new Cathedral of St. Raymond Nonnatus on May 26, 1955.

In 1965, Pope Paul VI appointed Romeo Blanchette of Chicago as an auxiliary bishop in Joliet.After McNamara died in 1966, Paul VI appointed Blanchette as the second bishop of Joliet in Illinois. In 1974, Blanchette authorized the establishment of the National Shrine of Mary Immaculate Queen of the Universe at St. Pius X Church in Lombard. This was the first such shrine in the United States. He retired as bishop of Joliet in 1979.

Blanchette's replacement, Auxiliary Joseph Imesch of the Archdiocese of Detroit, was named by Pope John Paul II. He was devoted to caring for the homeless. He launched the first Diocesan Annual Appeal in 1986

In 1987, the Carmelite Order opened the National Shrine and Museum of Saint Thérèse in Darien.Thérèse of Lisieux was a 19th century French nun who became popular for her advice on achieving spirtuality. The Shrine had originally been housed in a Chicago church, but was moved after a fire there in 1975.

In 1996, Imesch founded the Catholic Education Foundation, dedicated to providing scholarships to catholic schools in the diocese. Imesch started a partnership with the Diocese of Sucre in Bolivia, helping build and staff a hospital there.

With Imesch's retirement in 2006, Pope Benedict XVI named Bishop J. Peter Sartain of the Diocese of Little Rock as the next bishop of Joliet. Four years later, Benedict XVI appointed him as archbishop of the Archdiocese of Seattle. Sartain's replacement in 2011 was Bishop Robert Conlon of the Diocese of Steubenville. Conlon took a medical leave in 2019 and then resigned as bishop of Joliet the next year. In 2020 Pope Francis appointed Auxiliary Bishop Ronald Aldon Hicks of Chicago as the next bishop of Joliet. He served until January 11th, 2026 when Pope Leo XIV appointed him as the next archbishop of New York.

In February 2024, the diocese announced that it would close five churches and two schools . Hicks cited the aging of parish facilities, the diminishing number of priests, and the financial health of the parishes. In 2025, the diocese announced the closure of five more churches.

On September 17, 2026, Pope Leo XIV appointed Brendan J. Cahill as the seventh bishop of Joliet. Cahill was installed on November 11.

=== Reports of sex abuse ===
Alejandro Flores, a priest at Holy Family Church in Shorewood, was accused in January 2010 of sexually abusing a ten-year-old boy, while Flores was a seminarian. A few days after learning of the accusation, Flores attempted suicide. He pleaded guilty in September 2010 to one count of criminal sexual assault. After his release from prison in 2013, Flores was deported to Bolivia. He was laicized in 2020.

In September 2012, Bishop Conlon reinstated F. Lee Ryan, a diocesan priest, to ministry and assigned him to serve homebound parishioners. The diocese had suspended Ryan in 2010 from ministry in Crescent City after determining a sexual abuse allegation against him from the 1970s was credible. According to The Huffington Post, Conlon ruled that since child molestation was not a serious crime under canon law in the 1970s, the diocese could only limit Ryan in ministry and not remove him completely. Conlon soon changed his mind and permanently removed Ryan from ministry that same month.

In a 2015 lawsuit brought against the diocese by 14 sexual abuse victims, it was revealed that Bishop Blanchette ignored the inappropriate behavior of certain seminarians, allowing them to be ordained as priests for the diocese. Lawrence Gibbs was ordained in 1973 after being expelled from Saint Mary of the Lake Seminary in Mundelein. Bishop Imesch later transferred him to another diocese, and Gibbs left the priesthood in the 1990s. Blanchette also allowed James Nowak to be ordained after the Capuchin Order had dismissed him. In 2012, the diocese received allegations of sexual abuse of minors by Nowak, then assigned to Saints Peter and Paul Parish in Naperville. The diocese immediately removed him from ministry. It was later determined that Nowak had abused eight children. In April 2015, the diocese settled with the 14 sex abuse victims, including those of Nowak and Gibbs, for over $4 million.

A list released by the diocese in August 2018 revealed the names of 35 clergy who served in the diocese during a 70-year period and were credibly accused of sex abuse. That same month, the diocese announced that it had agreed to pay $1.4 million to two brothers and another male who said they had been sexually abused by Leonardo Mateo during the early 1980s. After the diocese started receiving complaints about Mateo in 1991, he admitted some guilt. The diocese removed him from ministry, and Mateo returned to his native Philippines.

In October 2019, Conlon and the diocese were named in a $100,000 sexual abuse lawsuit. The plaintiff was Barry Lowy, the legal guardian of the victim, a developmentally disabled man at Shapiro Developmental Center in Kankakee. The assailant was the priest Richard Jacklin, who was convicted of sexual assault in 2022 and in January 2023 was sentenced to 18 years in prison.

==== Attorney General's report ====
On May 23, 2023, Illinois Attorney General Kwame Raoul released a report on child sex abuse by Catholic clergy in Illinois. The multi-year investigation claimed that more than 450 Catholic clergy in Illinois abused nearly 2,000 children since 1950.

The report's harshest criticism was aimed at the Diocese of Joliet. It reported that Bishop Imesch insisted on an "off-the-books" approach to pedophile priests, with the result that survivors of abuse had a harder time getting justice. Imesch "covered up abuse by shipping off priests to unsuspecting parishes". He was disparaging and dismissive of the investigation, blaming others for his own organization's failures. Although Imesch has been replaced, the report was critical of the "concentration of power" within the diocese, making accountability difficult.

The Attorney General's report notes that the diocese instituted its first written policies against child sexual abuse in 1990, well before some other dioceses in the state, and that it employed a victims assistance coordinator. In spite of this, the report found, "the diocese adheres to unwritten rules for survivors reporting abuse that stall investigations and prevent the review board from making findings."

== Bishops ==
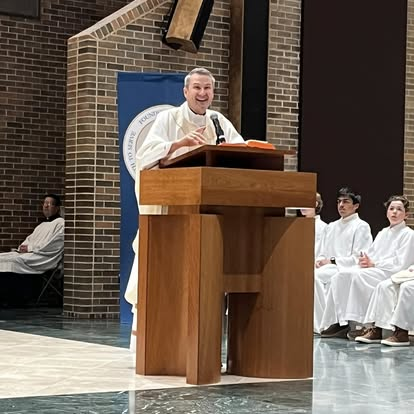
Bishop Hicks (2024)

=== Bishops of Joliet in Illinois ===
1. Martin Dewey McNamara (Dec 17, 1948 – May 23, 1966)
2. Romeo Roy Blanchette (Jul 19, 1966 – Jan 30, 1979)
3. Joseph Leopold Imesch (Jun 30, 1979 – May 16, 2006)
4. James Peter Sartain (May 16, 2006 – Sep 16, 2010), appointed Archbishop of Seattle
5. Robert Daniel Conlon (May 17, 2011 – May 4, 2020)
6. Ronald A. Hicks (July 17, 2020 – December 18, 2025), appointed Archbishop of New York
7. Brendan J. Cahill (2026-present)

=== Auxiliary bishops ===
- Romeo Roy Blanchette (Feb 8, 1965 – Jul 19, 1966), appointed Bishop of Joliet
- Raymond James Vonesh (Jan 5, 1968 – May 7, 1991)
- Daniel Kucera (Jun 6, 1977 – Mar 5, 1980), appointed Bishop of Salina and later Archbishop of Dubuque
- Daniel L. Ryan (Aug 14, 1981 – Nov 22, 1984), appointed Bishop of Springfield in Illinois
- Roger Kaffer (Apr 25, 1985 – Aug 15, 2002)
- James Edward Fitzgerald (Jan 11, 2002 – Jun 5, 2003)
- Joseph M. Siegel (Oct 28, 2009 – Oct 18, 2017), appointed Bishop of Evansville
- Dennis E. Spies (2024–present)

=== Apostolic administrators ===
- Richard E. Pates (Dec 27, 2019 – Jul 17, 2020)
- Dennis E. Spies (February 9, 2026-November 11, 2026)

== Major churches ==
- Cathedral of St. Raymond Nonnatus – Joliet
- National Shrine of Mary Immaculate Queen of the Universe – Lombard
- National Shrine and Museum of Saint Thérèse – Darien

== High schools ==
- Benet Academy – Lisle
- Bishop McNamara High School – Kankakee
- Chesterton Academy of the Holy Family – Lisle
- IC Catholic Prep – Elmhurst
- Joliet Catholic Academy – Joliet
- Montini Catholic High School – Lombard
- Providence Catholic High School – New Lenox
- St. Francis High School – Wheaton
