= Joseph Leopold Imesch =

Catholic bishop

His Excellency, The Most Reverend Joseph Leopold Imesch
- Bishop of Joliet in Illinois
- See: Diocese of Joliet in Illinois
- In office: August 28, 1979; May 16, 2006
- Predecessor: Romeo Roy Blanchette
- Successor: J. Peter Sartain
- Previous post: Auxiliary Bishop of Detroit (1973 to 1979)

Orders
- Ordination: December 16, 1956 by Martin J. O’Connor
- Consecration: April 3, 1973 by John Dearden

Personal details
- Born: June 21, 1931 Grosse Pointe Farms, Michigan, USA
- Died: December 22, 2015 (aged 84) Joliet, Illinois, USA
- Denomination: Roman Catholic
- Education: Sacred Heart Seminary High School and College; Pontifical North American College
- Motto: The Lord is near

Joseph Leopold Imesch (June 21, 1931 – December 22, 2015) was an American Catholic prelate who served as bishop of Joliet in Illinois from 1979 to 2006. He previously served as an auxiliary bishop of the Archdiocese of Detroit in Michigan from 1973 to 1979.

== Biography ==
=== Early life and education ===
Joseph Imesch was born on June 21, 1931, in Grosse Pointe Farms, Michigan, to Dionys and Margaret (née Margelisch) Imesch. After attending St. Ambrose Parish school and St. Paul Elementary School in Grosse Pointe, Michigan, he entered Sacred Heart Seminary High School and College in Detroit, Michigan. Imesch graduated from Sacred Heart with a Bachelor of Arts degree in 1953. He then continued his studies at the Pontifical North American College in Rome.

=== Ordination and ministry ===
While in Rome, Imesch was ordained to the priesthood for the Archdiocese of Detroit on December 16, 1956, by Bishop Martin J. O’Connor in the Chapel of the North American College. He earned a Licentiate of Sacred Theology there in 1957. Following his return to Michigan, Imesch served as an assistant pastor at St. Charles Parish in Detroit. In 1959, he became private secretary to Cardinal John Dearden, a position he held until 1971. In 1971, Imesch left his post as private secretary to become pastor of Our Lady of Sorrows Parish in Farmington, Michigan.

=== Auxiliary Bishop of Detroit ===
On February 8, 1973, Imesch was appointed as an auxiliary bishop of the Archdiocese of Detroit and titular bishop of Pomaria by Pope Paul VI. He received his episcopal consecration at the Cathedral of the Most Blessed Sacrament in Detroit on April 3, 1973, from Dearden, with Bishops Walter Schoenherr and Thomas serving as co-consecrators. He continued to serve at Our Lady of Sorrows until becoming regional bishop of the Northwest Region of the archdiocese in 1977.

=== Bishop of Joliet in Illinois ===
On June 30, 1979, Imesch was appointed the third bishop of Joliet in Illinois by Pope John Paul II. His installation took place at the Cathedral of St. Raymond Nonnatus in Joliet on August 28, 1979. Within the United States Conference of Catholic Bishops (USCCB), he served as chair of the Committee on Women in Society and the Church (1982–1985), the Committee Writing the Pastoral on the Concerns of Women (1983–92), and the Committee for Pastoral Practices (1995–1998). Imesch was also a member of the Marriage and Family Life Committee (1994–1997), the Committee for Stewardship (1995–2002), and the Administrative Board (2001–2003). From 2001 to 2003, he served as chair of Region VII, which includes dioceses in Illinois, Indiana, and Wisconsin.

Soon after arriving in Joliet, Imesch worked with other community leaders to create the Daybreak Shelter for the homeless. Every month, Imesch would visit the shelter to serve meals and converse with its clients. He started the first diocesan Annual Appeal in 1986 and in 1996 founded the Joliet Diocesan Catholic Education Foundation. Imesch started a sister relationship with the Diocese of Sucre in Bolivia, helping build and staff a hospital there.

=== Retirement and legacy ===
Shortly before reaching the mandatory retirement age of 75 for bishops, Imesch sent a letter of resignation as bishop of Joliet in Illinois to the pope. Pope Benedict XVI accepted his resignation as bishop of Joliet on May 16, 2006. Imesch was succeeded by Bishop J. Peter Sartain. After his retirement, Imesch continued to perform confirmations and other pastoral duties.

During a sexual abuse case against the Diocese of Joliet, Imesch admitted in sworn depositions to having transferred to different parishes priests accused of sexual abuse of minors. He never suspended any of them from ministry and did not report them to law enforcement. The diocese settled the case for $1.4 million.

Joseph Imesch eventually moved to Our Lady of Angels Retirement Home in Joliet, where he died on December 22, 2015, at age 84.

== See also ==
- Catholic Church hierarchy
- Catholic Church in the United States
- Historical list of the Catholic bishops of the United States
- List of Catholic bishops of the United States
- Lists of patriarchs, archbishops, and bishops

Catholic Church titles
| Preceded by – | Auxiliary Bishop of Detroit; 1973–1979 | Succeeded by – |
| Preceded by Romeo Roy Blanchette | Bishop of Joliet in Illinois; 1979–2006 | Succeeded by J. Peter Sartain |
| Preceded by – | Bishop Emeritus of Joliet; 2006–2015 | Succeeded by Incumbent |
