= Martin Dewey McNamara =

American prelate

His Excellency, The Most Reverend Martin Dewey McNamara
- Bishop of Joliet in Illinois
- See: Diocese of Joliet in Illinois
- In office: March 7, 1949; May 23, 1966
- Successor: Romeo Roy Blanchette

Orders
- Ordination: December 23, 1922 by George Mundelein
- Consecration: March 7, 1949 by Samuel Stritch

Personal details
- Born: May 12, 1896 Chicago, Illinois, US
- Died: May 23, 1966 (aged 70) Rochester, Minnesota, US
- Denomination: Roman Catholic
- Education: St. Mary's Seminary; The Catholic University of America
- Motto: Domine ut serviam (Lord, let me serve)

Martin Dewey McNamara (May 12, 1896 – May 23, 1966) was an American prelate of the Roman Catholic Church. He served as the first bishop of the new Diocese of Joliet in Illinois from 1949 until his death in 1966.

== Biography ==
=== Early life ===
McNamara was born on May 12, 1896, in Chicago, Illinois, to John Lawrence and Mary (née Hogan) McNamara. He was educated at St. Bride's School and Cathedral College, both in Chicago. McNamara then attended St. Mary's Seminary in Baltimore, Maryland and the Catholic University of America in Washington, D.C.

=== Priesthood ===
McNamara was ordained to the priesthood for the Archdiocese of Chicago by Cardinal George Mundelein on December 23, 1922. McNamara became a professor at Archbishop Quigley Preparatory Seminary in Chicago in 1925, and served as a chaplain at St. Vincent Infant Hospital in Chicago from 1932 to 1937. McNamara was named pastor of St. Francis Xavier Parish in Wilmette, Illinois, in 1937. The Vatican in 1946 elevated him to the rank of domestic prelate.

=== Bishop of Joliet in Illinois ===
On December 17, 1948, McNamara was appointed as the first bishop of the newly erected Diocese of Joliet in Illinois by Pope Pius XII. He received his episcopal consecration at Holy Name Cathedral in Chicago on March 7, 1949, from Cardinal Samuel Stritch, with Bishops John Boylan and Albert Zuroweste serving as co-consecrators. McNamara also served as chancellor of the College of St. Francis in Joliet.

McNamara was too ill to travel to Rome to attend the Second Vatican Council during the early 1960s. Martin McNamara died in Rochester, Minnesota, on May 23, 1966, at age 70.

Catholic Church titles
Preceded by none	Bishop of Joliet in Illinois; 1949—1966	Succeeded by Romeo Roy Blanchette
