= Cathedral of St. Raymond Nonnatus (Joliet, Illinois) =

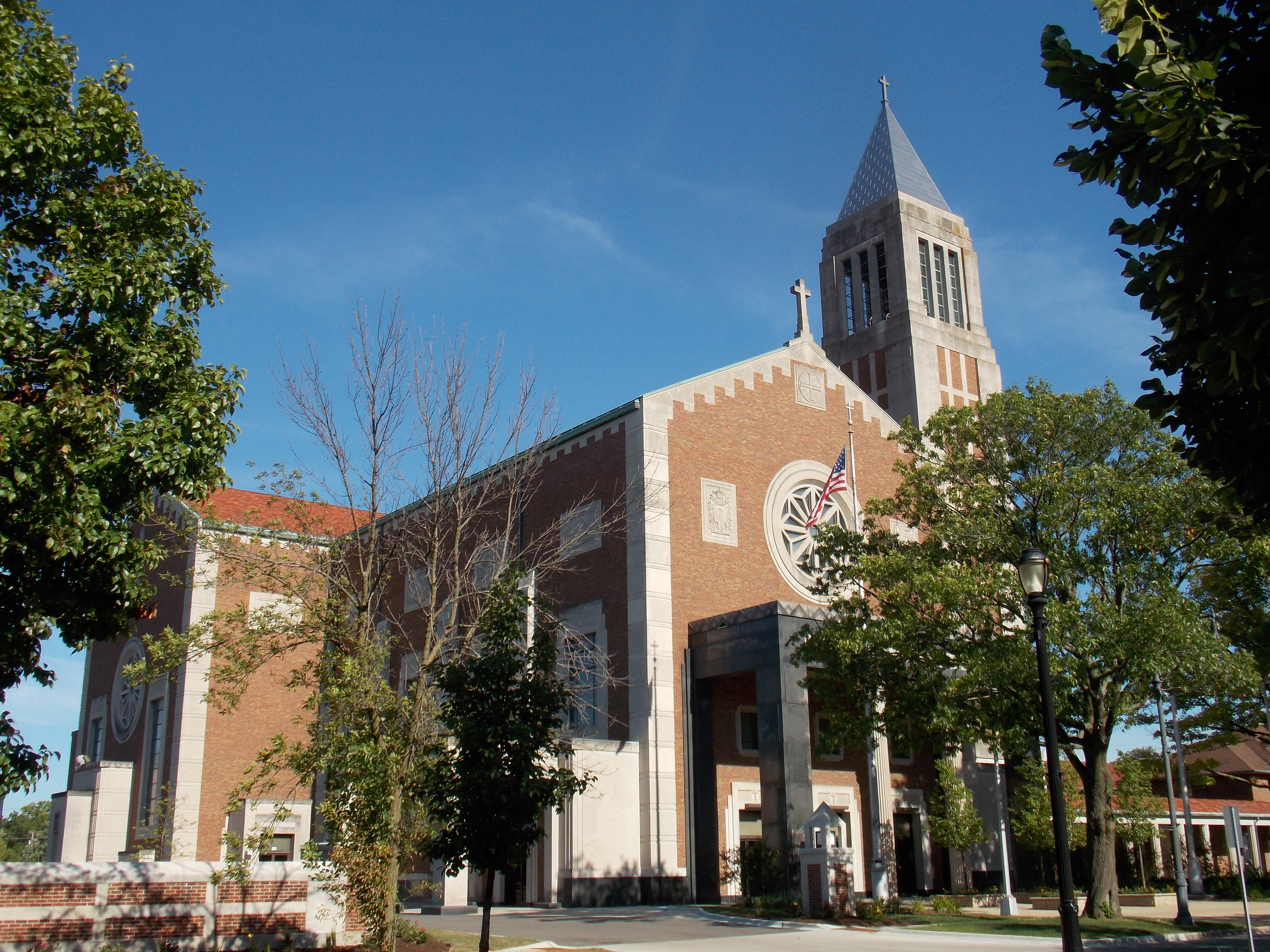
- St. Raymond Cathedral in 2015

- Location in Illinois
- 41°32′07″N 88°06′03″W
- Location: 604 N. Raynor Ave. Joliet, Illinois
- Country: United States
- Denomination: Roman Catholic Church
- Website: www.straymond.net

History
- Status: Cathedral/parish
- Founded: 1917
- Dedication: Raymond Nonnatus

Architecture
- Style: Classical Revival
- Completed: 1955
- Construction cost: $2.4 million

Specifications
- Materials: Brick

Administration
- Diocese: Joliet in Illinois

Clergy
- Bishop: Most Rev. Brendan J. Cahill
- Rector: Rev. William G. Dewan

Cathedral of St. Raymond Nonnatus is a Catholic cathedral in Joliet, Illinois, United States. It is the seat and a parish of the Diocese of Joliet in Illinois.

== History ==
=== St. Raymond Parish ===
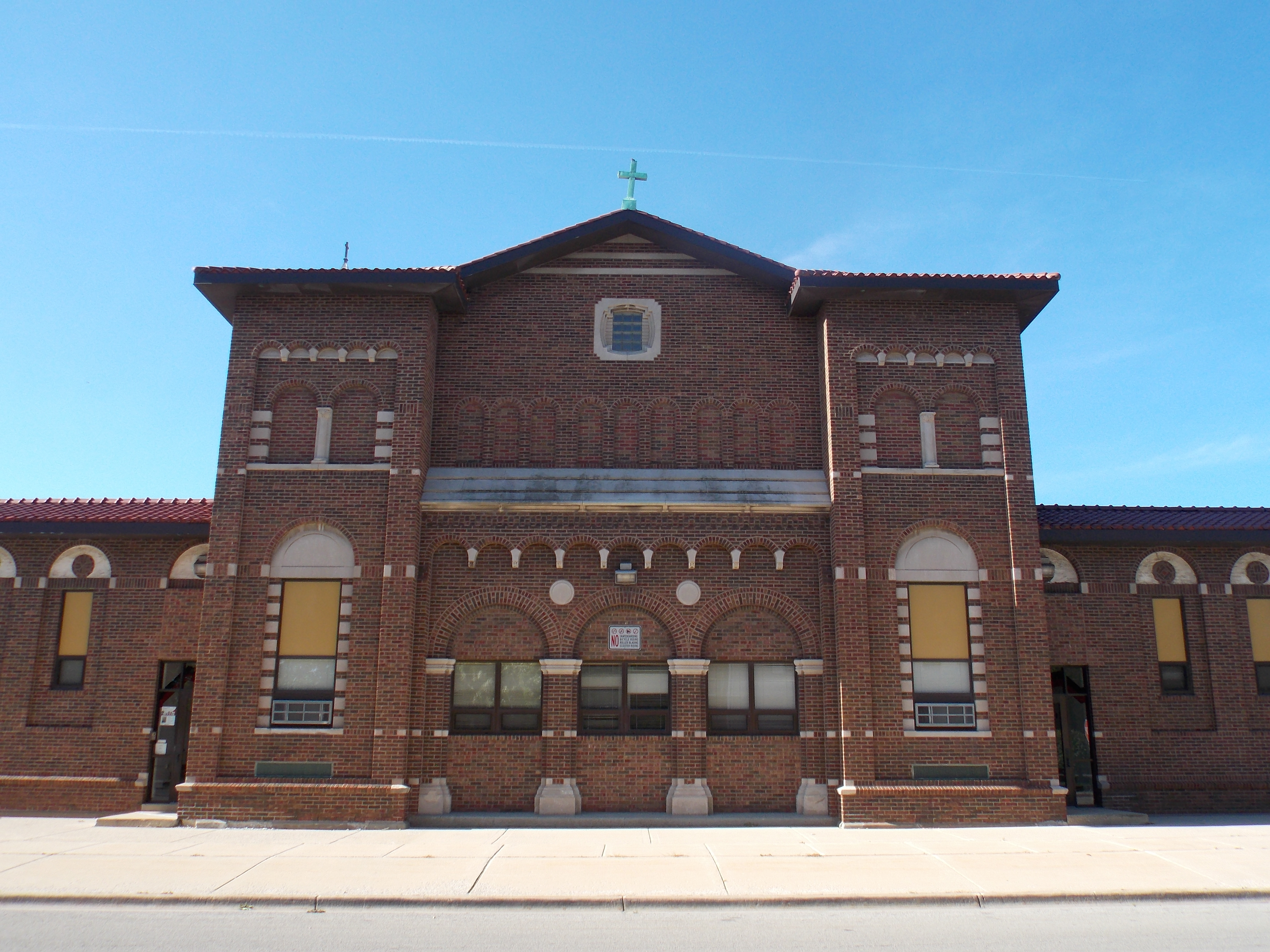
The original church is now part of the school.

As the city of Joliet expanded in the early 20th century, Archbishop George Mundelein of Chicago established St. Raymond Parish on June 28, 1917. The following day the Rev. Francis Scanlan, who was an assistant pastor at Holy Cross Parish in Chicago, was assigned as St. Raymond's first pastor. Initially, mass was celebrated for the parish at the Motherhouse of the Sisters of St. Francis of Mary Immaculate on Plainfield Road. Father Scanlan resided in the rectory of St. Patrick's Church in Joliet.

Ground was broken for a new church in November 1917 and the first Mass was celebrated in the new church on December 8, 1918. St. Raymond School opened in September 1918 with an enrollment of 178. The Sisters of St. Francis of Mary Immaculate formed the faculty. The school expanded quickly and the school building had to be enlarged several times over the next several decades.

=== Cathedral of St. Raymond ===
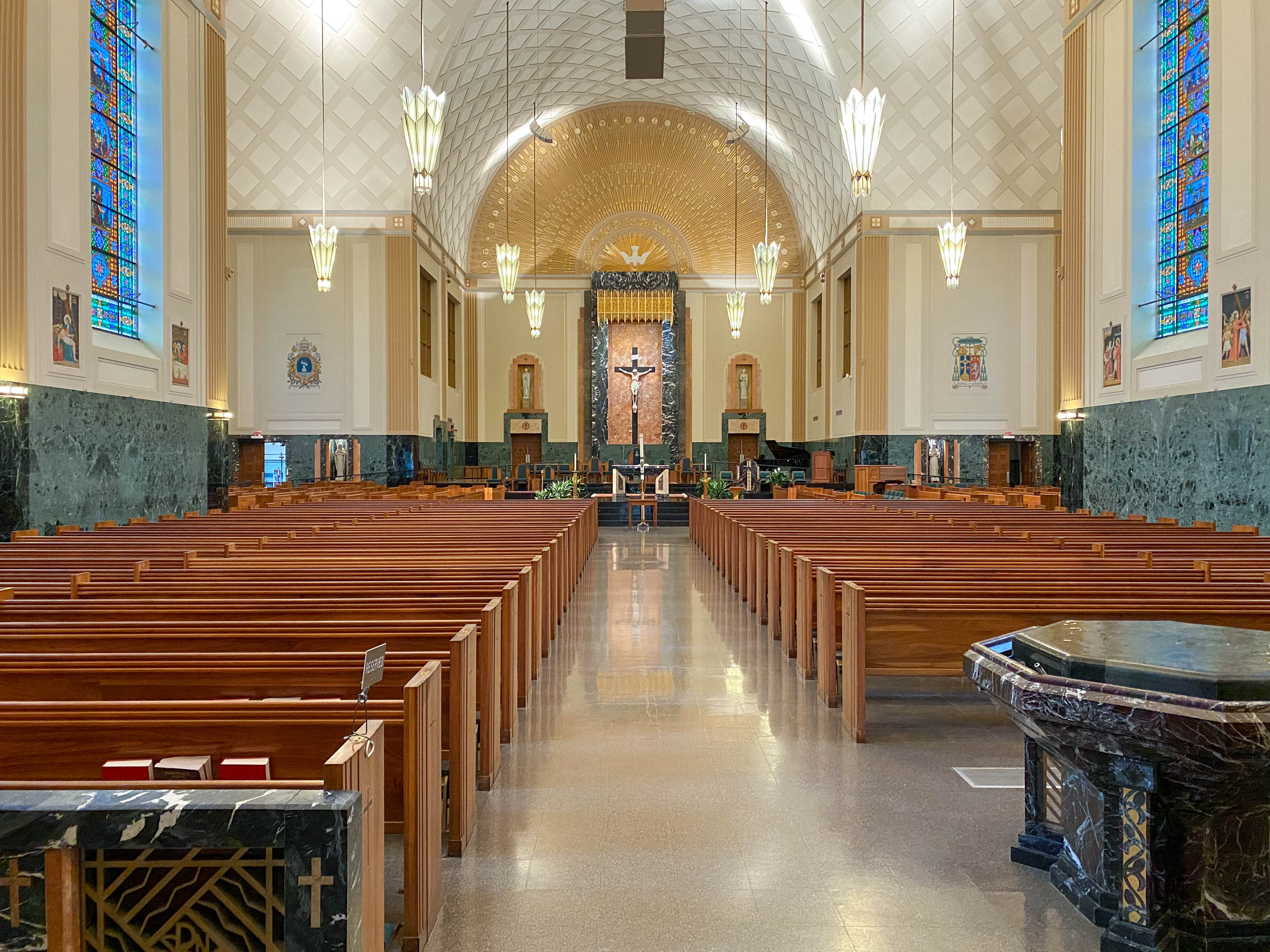
Interior, 2022

The Diocese of Joliet was established by Pope Pius XII on December 11, 1948. St. Raymond's was chosen to be the diocese's cathedral. It was decided that the church was not adequate for cathedral functions, so plans were made for a new cathedral church. Construction began in 1952 and the present cathedral was completed in 1955 for $2.4 million. The first mass in the new cathedral was celebrated by Bishop Martin McNamara on December 8, 1954. The marble altar and ambo were installed for the diocese's silver jubilee in 1973.

The Rev. Roger Kaffer, a native of the parish, briefly served as the cathedral rector in 1985. On April 25 of that year Pope John Paul II appointed Father Kaffer as auxiliary bishop of Joliet. His Episcopal ordination took place in the cathedral on June 26, 1985.

An extensive renovation of the cathedral took place during the pastorate of the Rev. Stanley Orlikiewicz. The altar was repositioned closer to the congregation and the baptismal font was moved into the nave of the church.

== Pastors/rectors ==
The following priests have served as pastors of St. Raymond's parish and after 1948 as the cathedral rector:

- Rev. Francis Scanlan (1917–1941)
- Msgr. Edwin V. Hoover (1941–1969)
- Rev. Thomas O’Keefe (1969–1985)
- Rev. Roger Kaffer (1985)
- Rev. Stanley Orlikiewicz (1985–2002)
- Rev. Jim Burnett (2002–2008)
- Rev. Brad Baker (2008–2018)
- Rev. William G. Dewan (2018–present)

== See also ==
- List of Catholic cathedrals in the United States
- List of cathedrals in the United States
- Roman Catholic Diocese of Joliet in Illinois
