= Deaths in April 2012 =

The following is a list of notable deaths in April 2012.

Entries for each day are listed alphabetically by surname. A typical entry lists information in the following sequence:

- Name, age, country of citizenship and reason for notability, established cause of death, reference (and language of reference, if not English).

Follow consistency

== April 2012 ==
=== 1 ===
- Nancy Beckage, 61, American entomologist.
- Ekrem Bora, 78, Turkish actor, pulmonary edema.
- Alvin J. Boutte, 82, American banker and businessman.
- Lionel Bowen, 89, Australian politician, MP for Kingsford-Smith (1969–1990); Deputy Prime Minister (1983–1990), pneumonia.
- Sauro Bufalini, 70, Italian Olympic basketball player.
- Chang Mei-yao, 71, Taiwanese actress.
- Giorgio Chinaglia, 65, Italian footballer (Lazio, New York Cosmos), heart attack.
- Miguel de la Madrid, 77, Mexican politician, President (1982–1988), complications of pulmonary emphysema.
- Leila Denmark, 114, American supercentenarian, author, and physician, credited with developing a whooping cough vaccine.
- Peter M. Douglas, 69, German American environmental activist, lung and throat cancer.
- Klaus Dylewski, 95, German SS officer.
- Jamaa Fanaka, 68, American filmmaker.
- Sir Stan Yapp, 70, English politician.

=== 2 ===
- Jesús Aguilarte, 53, Venezuelan politician, Governor of Apure State (1999–2000; 2004–2011), shot.
- Russell Allen, 99, American cyclist.
- Benhuan, 104, Chinese Buddhist master, honorary president of the Buddhist Association of China.
- Rosario Bentivegna, 89, Italian partisan and doctor.
- Warren Bonython, 95, Australian conservationist, explorer, author, and chemical engineer.
- Roger Breske, 73, American politician, member of the Wisconsin State Senate (1990–2008).
- Eugenio Castigliano, 66, Italian tennis player.
- Elizabeth Catlett, 96, American-born Mexican artist.
- Allie Clark, 88, American baseball player (Cleveland Indians, Philadelphia Athletics).
- Jim Delaney, 91, American Olympic silver medal-winning (1948) shot putter.
- Sarah Dreher, 75, American novelist and playwright.
- Pilar Fuertes Ferragut, 49, Spanish diplomat.
- Rychard Karpov, 80, Ukrainian Olympic boxer.
- John Kuenster, 87, American sportswriter, editor of Baseball Digest.
- Mauricio Lasansky, 97, Argentinian-born American printmaker.
- Jimmy Little, 75, Australian singer.
- Felice Ludovisi, 94, Italian painter.
- Alan Ruddock, 68, Irish martial artist and teacher.
- M. Saroja, 79, Indian film actress.
- Neslişah Sultan, 91, Turkish-born Ottoman and Egyptian royal, heart attack.

=== 3 ===
- Amer Al Midani, 55, Lebanese businessman.
- Lorne Benson, 81, Canadian football player (Winnipeg Blue Bombers).
- Arduino Bertoldo, 79, Italian Roman Catholic prelate, Bishop of Foligno (1992–2008).
- Michael Bzdel, 81, Canadian Ukrainian Catholic hierarch, Metropolitan of Winnipeg (1992–2006).
- Richard Descoings, 53, French academic director (Institut d'Études Politiques de Paris).
- Frank Fucarino, 91, American basketball player (Toronto Huskies).
- Nicholas King, 79, American actor, preserved the Watts Towers.
- Efraím Basílio Krevey, 83, Brazilian Ukrainian Catholic hierarch, Bishop of São João Batista em Curitiba (1978–2006).
- Mingote, 93, Spanish cartoonist, writer, and journalist.
- Govind Narain, 95, Indian civil servant, Governor of Karnataka (1977–1983).
- Airton Pavilhão, 77, Brazilian footballer.
- Xenia Stad-de Jong, 90, Dutch Olympic gold medal-winning (1948) athlete.
- Chief Jay Strongbow, 83, American professional wrestler (WWF).
- José María Zárraga, 81, Spanish footballer and manager.

=== 4 ===
- Muhammad Afrizal, 30, Indonesian boxer, PABA featherweight champion (2008), injuries sustained from bout.
- A. Dean Byrd, 64, American psychologist.
- Dimitris Christoulas, 77, Greek pensioner, suicide by gunshot.
- Eugénie De Keyser, 93, Belgian writer and art critic.
- Joe Doyle, 78–79, Irish cyclist.
- Anne Karin Elstad, 74, Norwegian author, stroke.
- Ficre Ghebreyesus, 50, Eritrean-American artist, heart failure.
- Josiah Henson, 90, American Olympic bronze medal-winning (1952) wrestler, stroke and myocardial infarction.
- Aminul Islam, 40, Bangladeshi trade union leader.
- Nikolay Krasovsky, 87, Russian mathematician.
- Claude Miller, 70, French director, producer, and screenwriter.
- Helge Sverre Nesheim, 92, Norwegian broadcaster.
- Richard Okada, 66, American linguist, Professor of Japanese at Princeton University.
- Dubravko Pavličić, 44, Croatian footballer.
- Roberto Rexach Benítez, 82, Puerto Rican politician, President of the Senate (1993–1996).

=== 5 ===
- Keith Adams, 85, Australian adventurer and filmmaker.
- Abd al-Rahim Aqiqi Bakhshayishi, 70, Iranian jurist, writer, journalist and translator.
- Joe Avezzano, 68, American football player (Boston Patriots) and coach (Dallas Cowboys, Oakland Raiders), heart attack.
- David Axon, 61, British astrophysicist.
- Pedro Bartolomé Benoit, 91, Dominican military general, Provisional President (1965).
- Angelo Castro Jr., 67, Filipino journalist, The World Tonight anchor (1986–2009, 2011–2012), lung cancer.
- Cynthia Dall, 41, American musician.
- Attila Hazai, 44, Hungarian writer, suicide.
- Jim Herr, 87, American businessman, founder of Herr's snack company.
- Jimmy Lawlor, 78, Irish footballer.
- Jim Marshall, 88, English businessman, founder of Marshall Amplification.
- Barney McKenna, 72, Irish musician (The Dubliners).
- Bingu wa Mutharika, 78, Malawian politician, President (since 2004), heart attack.
- Gil Noble, 80, American television reporter and host (Like It Is).
- Ferdinand Alexander Porsche, 76, German designer.
- Siegbert Salomon Prawer, 87, German-born British academic and writer.
- Bernard Rapoport, 94, American businessman and philanthropist.
- Regal Classic, 27, Canadian Thoroughbred racehorse, euthanized.
- A. G. L. Shaw, 96, Australian historian.
- Stanislav Strnad, 81, Czech film director.
- Sir Peter Tapsell, 82, New Zealand politician, Speaker of the House of Representatives (1993–1996).
- Dick Wearmouth, 85, Australian football player.
- Christer Zetterberg, 70, Swedish businessman.

=== 6 ===
- Boraî Bashir, 80, Sudanese footballer.
- Larry Canning, 86, English footballer (Aston Villa) and broadcaster, vascular dementia.
- Karl P. Cohen, 99, American mathematical physicist.
- Robin Denniston, 85, British book publisher.
- Fang Lizhi, 76, Chinese political activist and astrophysicist.
- Felipe Fernández García, 76, Spanish Roman Catholic prelate, Bishop of Ávila (1976–1991) and San Cristóbal de La Laguna o Tenerife (1991–2005).
- Promode Gogoi, 82, Indian politician.
- Roland Guilbault, 77, American rear admiral who commanded the USS Ticonderoga, the first Aegis cruiser.
- Dermot Hannafin (Snr), 84, Irish football player.
- Theunis Jonck, 86, South African Olympic weightlifter.
- Thomas Kinkade, 54, American painter, overdose of alcohol and Valium.
- Thomas Sancton Sr., 97, American novelist and journalist.
- Michael Sands, 66, American show business publicist and alleged CIA operative, choked.
- Arnold Saul, 87, American tennis player and coach.
- Sheila Scotter, 91, Australian fashion editor (Vogue Australia).
- Reed Whittemore, 92, American poet.

=== 7 ===
- Michaelina Bellamy, 59, American singer, dancer, and actress, acute myeloid leukemia.
- Arthur Budd, 66, Australian footballer.
- Dennis De Souza, 77, Guyanese musician.
- Steven Kanumba, 28, Tanzanian actor and director.
- Alexander Leslie-Melville, 14th Earl of Leven, 87, Scottish peer and soldier, Lord Lieutenant of Nairn (1969–1999).
- Miss Read, 98, English writer.
- Satsue Mito, 97, Japanese zoologist.
- Ignatius Moses I Daoud, 81, Syrian Catholic cardinal, Patriarch of Antioch (1998–2001), stroke complications.
- David E. Pergrin, 94, American soldier, led the most decorated World War II engineering battalion.
- Bashir Khan Qureshi, 54, Pakistani politician, cardiac arrest.
- Tom Runnels, 78, American football player (Washington Redskins).
- Harold Robert Steacy, 88, Canadian mineralogist.
- Anders Thor, 76, Swedish scientist and educator.
- Serafym Verzun, 62, Ukrainian Orthodox hierarch, Bishop of Zhytomyr (1992–1995), Archbishop of Rivne (1995–2000) and Kirovohrad (2002–2008).
- Mike Wallace, 93, American news correspondent (60 Minutes).
- Jamshid Zokirov, 63, Uzbek actor.

=== 8 ===
- Mark Ayers, 63, American labor leader.
- Gordon Bagier, 87, British politician, MP for Sunderland South (1964–1987).
- Bram Bart, 49, Dutch voice actor, pancreatic cancer.
- Pat Carlin, 82, English footballer.
- Juventino Castro y Castro, 93, Mexican judge and politician.
- John Egan, 59, Irish Gaelic footballer.
- June Gibbs, 89, American politician, cancer.
- George Wilberforce Kakoma, 89, Ugandan musician, composer of the Ugandan national anthem.
- Blair Kiel, 50, American football player (Green Bay Packers, Indianapolis Colts, Tampa Bay Buccaneers), heart attack.
- Donal O'Brien, 72, Irish hurler.
- Anatoly Ravikovich, 75, Russian film actor (The Pokrovsky Gate), cancer.
- Jack Tramiel, 83, Polish-born American businessman, founder of Commodore and CEO of Atari.
- Al Veigel, 95, American baseball player (Boston Braves).
- Rikiya Yasuoka, 64, Japanese actor and singer, heart failure.
- Janusz K. Zawodny, 90, Polish-born American historian, World War II resistance fighter.

=== 9 ===
- Carol Adams, 94, American actress and dancer.
- Takeshi Aono, 75, Japanese voice actor (Dragon Ball, One Piece), post-operative multiple cerebral infarction.
- Reginald Askew, 83, British priest and academic.
- Richard Beyer, 85, American sculptor.
- Lester Breslow, 97, American physician.
- François Brigneau, 92, French journalist and author.
- Barry Cahill, 90, Canadian-born American actor (Grand Theft Auto, Sweet Bird of Youth).
- Ryszard Chachulski, 81, Polish sculptor.
- Dick Cullum, 81, English footballer.
- Chanig ar Gall, 89, French broadcaster, entertainer, and writer.
- John Golding, 82, British artist, art scholar and curator.
- José Guardiola, 81, Spanish singer (Eurovision Song Contest 1963).
- Ismail Haron, 66, Singaporean singer.
- Mark Lenzi, 43, American Olympic gold medal-winning (1992) diver, hypotension.
- Wiebo Ludwig, 70, Canadian environmental activist and convicted bomber, esophageal cancer.
- Miriam Mafai, 86, Italian journalist (La Repubblica), author and politician.
- Ivan Nagel, 80, German theater director.
- Simo Nikolić, 71, Croatian Olympic sailor.
- Meral Okay, 53, Turkish actress and screenwriter (Muhteşem Yüzyıl), cancer.
- Boris Parygin, 81, Russian philosopher and sociologist.
- Don Reed, 92, American football coach (Long Beach State 49ers), natural causes.
- Robert R. Sokal, 86, Austrian-born American biostatistician and entomologist.
- Malcolm Thomas, 82, Welsh rugby union player.

=== 10 ===
- Svein Aasmundstad, 77, Norwegian civil servant.
- John Anderson, 69, Northern Irish bioengineer.
- Luis Aponte Martínez, 89, Puerto Rican Roman Catholic prelate and first cardinal, Metropolitan Archbishop of San Juan de Puerto Rico (1964–1999).
- Erdoğan Arıca, 57, Turkish football coach, lung cancer.
- Raymond Aubrac, 97, French WWII resistance fighter.
- Leonardo Mario Bernacchi, 79, Italian-born Bolivian Roman Catholic prelate, Vicar Apostolic of Camiri (1993–2009).
- Frank Bochow, 74, German trade unionist and diplomat.
- Barbara Buchholz, 52, German musician and composer, cancer.
- Virginia Spencer Carr, 82, American biographer.
- Maria Pia Casilio, 76, Italian film actress.
- Lili Chookasian, 90, American opera singer.
- Kurt Crain, 47, American football player (Houston Oilers, Green Bay Packers).
- Dorothy Dermody, 102, Irish Olympic (1948) fencer.
- Zvi Dinstein, 86, Israeli politician, MK (1965–1974), pulmonary embolism.
- Carl Gatto, 74, American politician, member of the Alaska House of Representatives (since 2003), prostate cancer.
- Tichaona Mudzingwa, 69, Zimbabwean politician.
- Odd Rikard Olsen, 64, Norwegian newspaper editor and politician.
- Akin Omoboriowo, 81, Nigerian lawyer and politician.
- Andy Replogle, 58, American baseball player (Milwaukee Brewers).
- Afewerk Tekle, 80, Ethiopian artist, complications of stomach ulcer.
- Grant Tilly, 74, New Zealand actor (30 Days of Night).
- Carlos F. Truan, 76, American politician.
- N. Varadarajan, 88, Indian politician.
- John Weaver, 92, American sculptor.

=== 11 ===
- Julio Alemán, 79, Mexican actor, cancer.
- Ghamar Ariyan, 90, Iranian researcher and author.
- Ahmed Ben Bella, 93, Algerian politician, Prime Minister (1962–1963); President (1963–1965).
- Misbach Yusa Biran, 78, Indonesian film director.
- Roger Caron, 73, Canadian author, prison escape artist, and bank robber, infection.
- Eugene V. Clark, 86, American Roman Catholic priest.
- Steve Cokely, 59, American political researcher and lecturer.
- Tippy Dye, 97, American college athlete, coach, and athletic director.
- Peter Gerber, 88, Swiss politician.
- Gustaf Jansson, 90, Swedish Olympic bronze medal-winning (1952) athlete.
- Keith Leeson, 83, Australian Olympic hockey player.
- Bob Lewis, 86, American college basketball player (University of Utah).
- Gianni Marchetti, 78, Italian composer and songwriter.
- Moses Majekodunmi, 95, Nigerian politician, Minister of Health (1960–66).
- Hal McKusick, 87, American jazz saxophonist, clarinetist, and flautist, natural causes.
- Yolanda Mérida, 82, Mexican actress.
- Rainer Penkert, 90, German actor.
- Agustin Roman, 83, Cuban-born American Roman Catholic prelate, Auxiliary Bishop of Miami (1979–2003), heart attack.

=== 12 ===
- Uno Anton, 70, Estonian politician.
- Vladimir Astapovsky, 65, Soviet Olympic bronze medal-winning (1976) footballer.
- Kellon Baptiste, 38, Grenadian footballer, cancer.
- Joseph Bruggenschmidt, 82, Americal politician and forester.
- Marly Bueno, 78, Brazilian actress.
- Mohit Chattopadhyay, 77, Indian playwright, dramatist, and poet, cancer.
- Linda Cook, 63, American actress.
- Nico dei Gabbiani, 67, Italian singer.
- Elizabeth Ferris, 71, British Olympic bronze medal-winning (1960) diver.
- James Gallen, 83, American politician, complications from appendicitis.
- David Alan Gore, 58, American convicted serial killer, execution by lethal injection.
- Rodgers Grant, 76, American jazz pianist, cancer.
- Steinbjørn B. Jacobsen, 74, Faroese poet and writer, Faroese Literature Prize recipient.
- Robert Kennedy, 73, Canadian publisher, complications from skin cancer.
- Andrew Love, 70, American saxophonist (The Memphis Horns), complications of Alzheimer's disease.
- Masakre, 57, Mexican professional wrestler, cancer.
- Bruce Morrison, 88, Australian football player.
- Manfred Orzessek, 78, German footballer.
- Amy Tryon, 42, American Olympic bronze medal-winning (2004) equestrian, accidental drug overdose.

=== 13 ===
- Miguel Albareda Creus, 93, Spanish chess player.
- Eunice Alberts, 84–85, American contralto.
- Victor Arnold, 75, American actor.
- Irving K. Barber, 89, Canadian forester and philanthropist.
- John P. Blane, 82, American diplomat, United States Ambassador to Rwanda (1982–1985); Chad (1985–1988).
- William B. Buffum, 90, American diplomat, US Ambassador to Lebanon (1970–1974), natural causes.
- Cecil Chaudhry, 70, Pakistani fighter pilot, school principal, and activist, lung cancer.
- Florin Constantiniu, 79, Romanian historian.
- Erland Cullberg, 81, Swedish artist.
- William Alden Edson, 99, American scientist and engineer.
- Avraham Goldberg, 99, American-born Israeli Talmud scholar.
- Verónica Gómez, 26, Venezuelan volleyball player, heart failure.
- Shūichi Higurashi, 75, Japanese manga illustrator, painted cover for Big Comic (1970–2011), pneumonia.
- Ruth Davis Kohrt, 90, American librarian and novelist.
- Marilyn Lovell Matz, 81, American actress (Ghosts of Mississippi), therapist and activist.
- Peter Mullins, 86, Australian Olympic decathlete (1948), basketball player, and coach.
- Lewis Nordan, 72, American writer, pneumonia.
- Mario Rizzi, 86, Italian Roman Catholic prelate, Titular Archbishop of Bagnoregio (since 1991), Apostolic Nuncio to Bulgaria (1991–1996).
- David S. Smith, 94, American diplomat, United States Ambassador to Sweden (1976–1977).
- Robert Wigmore, 62, Cook Islands politician.

=== 14 ===
- Celal Başkale, Turkish Kurdish politician, killed.
- Émile Bouchard, 92, Canadian ice hockey player (Montreal Canadiens), member of the Hockey Hall of Fame.
- Tom Farrell, 87, Canadian politician.
- William Finley, 69, American actor (Phantom of the Paradise), complications from surgery.
- C. Miller Fisher, 98, Canadian neurologist.
- Jonathan Frid, 87, Canadian actor (Dark Shadows), complications from a fall and pneumonia.
- Bela Gold, 97, Hungarian-born American businessman and professor.
- Ma Jaya, 71, American spiritual teacher, pancreatic cancer.
- Lee Kyung-hwan, 24, South Korean footballer (Suwon Bluewings), suicide by jumping.
- Eddie May, 68, English football player and manager.
- Piermario Morosini, 25, Italian footballer (Livorno), cardiac arrest.
- Martin Poll, 89, American film producer (The Lion in Winter), natural causes.
- Edward Purrington, 82, American opera director.
- Paulo César Saraceni, 78, Brazilian film director.
- Vincent F. Seyfried, 93, American historian.
- Per G. Stavnum, 70, Norwegian diplomat, ambassador to Lithuania (1991–1996); Vietnam (2000–2005).
- Synchronised, 9, Irish racehorse, euthanised after race fall.
- Viro the Virus, 33, American hip hop artist.
- Mikhail Voronin, 73, Ukrainian fashion designer.
- Cathie Wright, 82, American politician, California State Senator (1992–2000).

=== 15 ===
- Fred Birchmore, 100, American adventurer.
- Paul Bogart, 92, American Emmy Award-winning television director (All in the Family), natural causes.
- Jesús Giles Sánchez, 50, Mexican politician, cancer.
- Hans Johansson, 85, Swedish Olympic equestrian.
- Peter McKenzie, 59, New Zealand conservationist, cancer.
- Yasushi Mieno, 88, Japanese banker, Governor of the Bank of Japan (1989–1994), cardiac arrest.
- Jenny Olsson, 32, Swedish Olympic cross-country skier, cancer.
- Bob Perani, 69, Italian-born American ice hockey player (Flint Generals).
- Aleksandr Porokhovshchikov, 73, Russian actor, complications from diabetes and stroke.
- Murray Rose, 73, Australian Olympic gold medal-winning (1956, 1960) swimmer, leukaemia.
- Samir Said, 48, Kuwaiti footballer, traffic collision.
- Rich Saul, 64, American football player (Los Angeles Rams), leukemia.
- Dwayne Schintzius, 43, American basketball player (New Jersey Nets), respiratory failure.
- James Shaner, 75, American politician, member of the Pennsylvania House of Representatives (1995–2006).
- Joan Tozzer, 90, American figure skater.
- Bob Wright, 86, American college basketball coach (Morehead State University).
- Tadashi Yamamoto, 76, Japanese businessman, founder of the Japan Center for International Exchange, gall bladder cancer.

=== 16 ===
- Sári Barabás, 98, Hungarian-born German opera singer, stroke.
- Marian Biskup, 89, Polish historian.
- Laura Bornholdt, 93, American historian and academic administrator.
- Ernest Callenbach, 83, American writer and environmentalist.
- Teddy Charles, 84, American jazz musician and composer.
- Jack Cohen, 93, American rabbi.
- Ray Davey, 97, Northern Irish Presbyterian minister, founder of the Corrymeela Community.
- Jean Fréchaut, 97, French cyclist.
- Margalith Galun, 85, Israeli lichenologist, after a lengthy illness.
- Alan Hacker, 73, British clarinetist.
- George Kunda, 56, Zambian politician, Vice President (2008–2011), anaemia.
- A. F. Millidge, 98, British arachnologist.
- Mærsk Mc-Kinney Møller, 98, Danish shipping magnate.
- Antoine Hamid Mourany, 82, Lebanese-born Syrian Maronite hierarch, Metropolitan of Damascus (1989–1999).
- Arthur Nadel, 80, American fund manager and convicted embezzler.
- Ngô Đình Lệ Quyên, 53, South Vietnamese-born Italian lawyer, daughter of Madame Nhu, traffic collision.
- Oyalı, 4, Turkish sheep, first cloned animal in Turkey, lung disease.
- Carlo Petrini, 64, Italian footballer.
- Graham Simpson, 68, British musician (Roxy Music).
- Randy Starkman, 51, Canadian sports journalist, pneumonia.
- Jack Streidl, 93, American football coach.

=== 17 ===
- Alexander Appleford, 90, English pilot.
- Barry Askew, 75, British newspaper editor (News of the World).
- Walter M. Baker, 84, American politician.
- Leila Berg, 94, British children's author.
- J. Quinn Brisben, 77, American civil rights activist and Socialist candidate for U.S. President in 1992.
- Jake Carter, 87, American basketball player.
- Tim Collins, 66, American golfer.
- Michael Green, New Zealand diplomat, cancer. (death announced on this date)
- Janine Jambu, 69, French politician.
- Stan Johnson, 75, American baseball player (Chicago White Sox, Kansas City Athletics).
- Ron Karabatsos, 78, American actor (Flashdance, Get Shorty, Prince of the City).
- Almasbei Kchach, 53, Abkhazian politician, suicide by gunshot.
- Sukenobu Kudō, 84, Japanese speed skater (1952 Winter Olympics), renal failure.
- Irving Millman, 88, American virologist and microbiologist.
- Dimitris Mitropanos, 64, Greek singer, pulmonary edema.
- Nityananda Mahapatra, 99, Indian politician, poet, and journalist, natural causes.
- Jonathan Plaut, 69, American rabbi.
- Ben H. Procter, 85, American author and football player (Los Angeles Rams), Parkinson's disease.
- Stanley Rogers Resor, 94, American lawyer, Secretary of the Army (1965–1971).
- Jane Schaberg, 74, American biblical scholar.
- Dom Valentino, 83, American sports broadcaster.
- Louis Vorster, 45, South African-born Namibian cricketer, shot.

=== 18 ===
- Elsa Abuin, 69, Argentine chemist.
- Pavol Bencz, 75, Czechoslovak footballer.
- Arthur Bottom, 82, English footballer (York City).
- José Cerviño Cerviño, 91, Spanish Roman Catholic prelate, Bishop of Tui-Vigo (1976–1996).
- Dick Clark, 82, American television host and producer (American Bandstand, Dick Clark's New Year's Rockin' Eve, Pyramid), heart attack.
- Peter Collis, 82, English artist.
- Graham Cooper, 75, English cricketer.
- Hillman Curtis, 51, American graphic designer and filmmaker, colon cancer.
- Tina De Mola, 88, Italian actress, singer and television personality.
- John Anthony Golding, 91, Turks and Caicos Islands administrator.
- René Lépine, 82, Canadian real estate developer, prostate cancer.
- Kristian Lund, 80, Norwegian military officer, engineer and politician.
- John O'Neil, 91, American baseball player (Philadelphia Phillies).
- Robert O. Ragland, 80, American film score composer.
- Sterling Ridge, 75, American politician, Mayor of Glendale, Arizona (1976–1980), three-term member of the Arizona House of Representatives.
- Col Saddington, 74, Australian football player.
- Naum Shopov, 78, Bulgarian actor.
- Åge Storhaug, 74, Norwegian Olympic (1960, 1964) gymnast, cancer.
- Fritz Theilen, 84, German resistance member.
- K. D. Wentworth, 61, American science fiction author, cancer and pneumonia.

=== 19 ===
- Muhammad Mustafa Badawi, 86, Egyptian academic.
- Allison Baden-Clay, 43, Australian executive, murdered.
- Leopold David de Rothschild, 84, British financier and philanthropist.
- Richard Drinnon, 87, American historian.
- Ray Easterling, 62, American football player (Atlanta Falcons), suicide by gunshot.
- Greg Ham, 58, Australian musician (Men at Work).
- Levon Helm, 71, American musician (The Band) and actor (Coal Miner's Daughter), throat cancer.
- Mansur Kamaletdinov, 86, Russian ballet dancer and teacher.
- Ken Lowrie, 85, Australian politician, member of the Tasmanian Legislative Council (1968–1986).
- Jacques Martin, 52, Canadian Paralympian, gold medalist (1984, 1988, 1992, 1996), heart attack.
- Enrico Pedrini, 72, Italian art theorist.
- Murtaza Razvi, 47, Pakistani journalist, strangled.
- Chitturi Satyanarayana, 98, Indian surgeon.
- Meenakshi Thapar, 27, Indian actress (404), strangled.
- Mabel Van Camp, 91, Canadian judge, first woman on the Supreme Court of Ontario.
- Valeri Vasiliev, 62, Russian Olympic gold (1972, 1976) and silver (1980) medal-winning ice hockey player.
- Zozo Zarpa, 73, Greek actress, heart failure.

=== 20 ===
- Mario Arturo Acosta Chaparro, 70, Mexican army general, shot.
- Ayten Alpman, 82, Turkish singer, respiratory failure.
- Jack Ashley, Baron Ashley of Stoke, 89, British politician and disability campaigner, MP for Stoke-on-Trent South (1966–1992).
- Alfie Biggs, 76, English footballer.
- Brian Boland, 80, Australian footballer.
- Matt Branam, 57, American academic, President of Rose–Hulman Institute of Technology (since 2009).
- Craig Cameron, 66, American ice hockey player.
- Peter Carsten, 83, German actor.
- George Cowan, 92, American physical chemist and member of Manhattan Project, injuries from a fall.
- Clément Haeyen, 84, Belgian Olympic (1960) weightlifter.
- Shannon Johnson, 28, American convicted murderer, execution by lethal injection.
- Mike Lipari, 79, Canadian Olympic weightlifter.
- Joe Muranyi, 84, American jazz musician.
- Don Wedge, 82, American football referee (1972–1995).
- Bert Weedon, 91, English guitarist and composer.

=== 21 ===
- John S. Ballard, 89, American politician.
- Doris Betts, 79, American author, lung cancer.
- Ramón Búa Otero, 78, Spanish Roman Catholic prelate, Bishop of Tarazona (1982–1989) and Calahorra y La Calzada-Logroño (1989–2003).
- Charles Colson, 80, American White House Counsel convicted in Watergate scandal, evangelist, founder of Prison Fellowship, brain hemorrhage.
- Albert Falco, 84, French sea captain and scuba diver.
- Wim Franken, 90, Dutch composer and pianist.
- Lenny Gault, 78, American country music singer, cancer.
- Harry Heslet, 92, American baseball player.
- Brian Heward, 76, English footballer.
- Charles Higham, 81, English-born American biographer, heart attack.
- Heinz Jentzsch, 92, German racehorse trainer.
- Peter Milano, 82, American businessman.
- Frank Odoi, 64, Kenyan cartoonist, road accident.
- Jerry Toppazzini, 80, Canadian ice hockey player (Boston Bruins, Chicago Blackhawks, Detroit Red Wings).

=== 22 ===
- John Amabile, 73, American football scout (New York Giants), coach and player (Boston College).
- António Correia, 78, Portuguese Olympic sailor (1972, 1984).
- Gunnar Göransson, 78, Swedish Olympic cyclist.
- Bill Granger, 70, American author and columnist.
- Matti Kuosku, 71, Swedish Olympic cross-country skier.
- Petr Lisičan, 49, Czech Olympic cross-country skier.
- Buzz Potamkin, 66, American television producer.
- George Rathmann, 84, American businessman, first chief executive of Amgen, kidney failure.
- Aristarkh (Stankevich), 70, Belarusian Orthodox hierarch, Archbishop of Gomel and Zhlobin (since 1990).

=== 23 ===
- Navodaya Appachan, 81, Indian film producer, cancer.
- Lillemor Arvidsson, 68, Swedish trade union leader and politician, Governor of Gotland (1998–2004).
- Breda Beban, 59, Serbian film and video artist.
- Eunice Bommelyn, 85, American Tolowa cultural advocate, Tolowa language proponent, and historian.
- Peter Boothman, 68–69, Australian guitarist, composer, and educator.
- Hacho Boyadzhiev, 80, Bulgarian television and film director.
- Michael Brinton, 70, British businessman, Lord Lieutenant of Worcestershire (since 2001), cancer.
- Yvonne Brown, 59, American politician, cancer.
- Billy Bryans, 64, Canadian musician and producer (Parachute Club), lung cancer.
- Carmen Bunster, 94, Chilean actress.
- Chang Myung-sam, 48, Korean taekwondo practitioner, car accident.
- Roland Dale, 84, American football player (Washington Redskins).
- Michael DeBose, 58, American politician, Member of the Ohio House of Representatives (2002–2010), complications of Parkinson's disease.
- Chris Ethridge, 65, American country rock bassist (International Submarine Band, The Flying Burrito Brothers), pancreatic cancer.
- Veriano Luchetti, 73, Italian opera singer.
- Tommy Marth, 33, American musician (The Killers), suicide by gunshot.
- Raymond Thorsteinsson, 91, Canadian geologist.
- LeRoy T. Walker, 93, American track coach, Chairman of the US Olympic Committee (1992–1996).
- Flo Whyard, 95, Canadian politician, Mayor of Whitehorse (1981–1983), Yukon territorial minister (1975–1978), editor of the Whitehorse Star.

=== 24 ===
- Svetlana Berzina, 80, Russian Egyptologist.
- Sheena Bora, 25, Indian executive, strangulation.
- Fred Bradley, 91, American baseball player (Chicago White Sox).
- William A. Campbell, 95, American USAF colonel, member of the Tuskegee Airmen.
- William Chapman, 88, American operatic baritone and stage actor.
- Nell Ginjaar-Maas, 80, Dutch politician, State Secretary for Education and Science (1982–1989).
- Daniel McGillivray Brown, 89, Scottish chemist.
- Erast Parmasto, 83, Estonian mycologist.
- Miguel Portas, 53, Portuguese politician, Member of the European Parliament for Portugal (since 2004), lung cancer.
- Eusebio Razo Jr., 46, Mexican-born American jockey, explosion.
- Shireen Ritchie, Baroness Ritchie of Brompton, 67, British peer, councillor for Brompton ward, Royal Borough of Kensington and Chelsea (since 1998).
- Yugo Sako, 84, Japanese movie director, aspiration pneumonia.
- Village Kid, 31, Australian standardbred racehorse.
- Amos Vogel, 91, Austrian-born American film scholar, founder of the New York Film Festival and Cinema 16.
- George Vujnovich, 96, American OSS agent and leader of Operation Halyard, natural causes.
- Ambrose Weekes, 93, British Anglican bishop, first Suffragan Bishop in Europe.
- Thomas Christian Wyller, 89, Norwegian political scientist.

=== 25 ===
- Gerry Bahen, 83, Australian football player and administrator.
- Ben Blacknall, 65, American football player and coach.
- Rolando Ramos Dizon, 67, Filipino educator, Chairman of the Commission on Higher Education (2003–2004).
- Ben Gabriel, 94, Australian actor and director.
- Sir Brandon Gough, 74, British businessman, Chancellor of the University of East Anglia (since 2003).
- Harry Hicks, 86, British Olympic runner.
- Denny Jones, 101, American politician, member of the Oregon House of Representatives (1973–1999).
- Moscelyne Larkin, 87, American ballerina.
- Louis le Brocquy, 95, Irish painter.
- Stephen Maxwell, 69, Scottish politician.
- Hysni Milloshi, 66, Albanian politician.
- Ian Oswald, 82, Scottish sleep researcher.
- Paul L. Smith, 75, American actor (Popeye, Dune, Maverick).
- Jan Bernard Szlaga, 71, Polish Roman Catholic prelate, Bishop of Pelplin (since 1992), duodenal ulcer hemorrhage.
- Brij Bhushan Tiwari, 71, Indian politician, heart attack.

=== 26 ===
- Roy Claughton, 84, Australian politician.
- Clarence Cormier, 81, Canadian politician.
- Pete Fornatale, 66, American radio disc jockey (WNEW-FM, WFUV), brain aneurysm.
- Franco Fraticelli, 83, Italian film editor.
- Floyd D. Hall, 96, American pilot, chairman and chief executive of Eastern Air Lines.
- Ardian Klosi, 55, Albanian political analyst, publicist, and writer, suicide by hanging.
- Ted Newall, 76, Canadian businessman.
- Zé Peixe, 85, Brazilian naval pilot.
- Terence Spinks, 74, British Olympic gold medal-winning (1956) boxer.
- Margie Stewart, 92, American model and actress.
- Chut Wutty, 40, Cambodian environmental activist, shot.

=== 27 ===
- Wayne Aiken, 76, Canadian football player.
- Ron Ballatore, 71, American swimming coach, bone cancer.
- Daniel Boatwright, 82, American politician, California State Senator (1980–1996).
- Anatoly Lebed, 48, Russian army officer, Hero of the Russian Federation.
- Takayoshi Nagamine, 66, Japanese karate master and trainer.
- František Procházka, 50, Czech Olympic bronze medal-winning (1992) ice hockey player.
- Ari Magder, 28, Canadian child actor (Shining Time Station), complications from pneumonia.
- Harold Pupkewitz, 96, Lithuanian-born Namibian businessman, heart attack.
- René Rouffeteau, 86, French Olympic bronze medal-winning (1948) cyclist.
- Bill Skowron, 81, American baseball player (New York Yankees, Chicago White Sox), heart failure.
- Allen Tough, 76, Canadian scientist, complications of multiple system atrophy.
- Abu Mohammad Jawad Walieddine, 96, Lebanese Druze religious leader.
- David Weiss, 65, Swiss artist (Peter Fischli & David Weiss).

=== 28 ===
- Sir Fred Allen, 92, New Zealand rugby player, captain, and coach, leukemia.
- Bobby Alto, 73, American actor (Crocodile Dundee, Prince of the City, Love Is All There Is) and comedian, complications from a stroke.
- Charles Barron, 76, Scottish writer, playwright, teacher and lecturer, multi-organ failure.
- Harald Bergseth, 88, Norwegian soil scientist.
- John Birch, 82, British musician.
- Matilde Camus, 92, Spanish poet.
- H. Fred Clark, 75, American pediatrician, medical scientist, and social activist.
- Giorgio Consolini, 91, Italian singer.
- Jim Downing, 65–66, Irish Gaelic footballer.
- Joaquín Dualde, 79, Spanish Olympic bronze medal-winning (1960) field hockey player.
- Al Ecuyer, 74, American-born Canadian football player (Edmonton Eskimos).
- Stein Johnson, 90, Norwegian Olympic (1948, 1952) discus thrower.
- Jackie Kelso, 90, American jazz musician.
- Walter Mathews, 85, American actor (General Hospital).
- Patricia Medina, 92, British actress, natural causes.
- Dudley Peake, 77, Welsh footballer.
- Milan N. Popović, 87, Serbian psychiatrist and author.
- Sir John Quinton, 82, British banker (Barclays).
- Aberdeen Shikoyi, 27, Kenyan rugby player, spinal cord injury sustained in match play.
- Tom Spence, 50, Scottish footballer, suspected heart failure.
- Geoffrey Tyler, 91, British educationalist.
- Ervin Zádor, 76, Hungarian water polo player, Olympic gold medalist (1956).

=== 29 ===
- Amarillo Slim, 83, American professional gambler, winner of the 1972 World Series of Poker main event, colon cancer.
- Éric Charden, 69, French singer, lymphoma.
- Wiesław Chrzanowski, 88, Polish politician and professor, Marshal of the Sejm (1991–1993).
- Jean Desmasures, 83, French Olympic field hockey player.
- Dynaformer, 27, American racehorse and sire, euthanized.
- Shukri Ghanem, 69, Libyan politician, Prime Minister (2003–2006) and Minister of Oil (2006–2011).
- Joel Goldsmith, 54, American film and television composer (Stargate), son of Jerry Goldsmith.
- Daisy Junor, 92, Canadian baseball player (AAGPBL).
- Joram Lindenstrauss, 75, Israeli mathematician.
- Jim McCrary, 72, American photographer.
- Roland Moreno, 66, French inventor, creator of the smart card.
- Kenny Roberts, 84, American country music singer and yodeler.
- Jean Tschabold, 86, Swiss Olympic silver medal-winning (1952) gymnast.
- Idar Ulstein, 78, Norwegian businessman, cancer.

=== 30 ===
- Cliff Ashby, 92, British poet and novelist.
- Finn Benestad, 82, Norwegian musicologist.
- Ernst Bolldén, 45, Swedish wheelchair table tennis player and Paralympian gold (1996) and bronze (1996, 2000) medalist, bladder cancer.
- Tomás Borge, 81, Nicaraguan politician and poet, founder of the Sandinista National Liberation Front, pneumonia.
- Alexander Dale Oen, 26, Norwegian Olympic silver medal-winning (2008) swimmer, cardiac arrest.
- Alexandru Dincă, 66, Romanian handball player.
- Bob Finkel, 94, American producer and director, age-related illnesses.
- Giannis Gravanis, 54, Greek footballer (Panionios F.C.).
- Andrew Levane, 92, American basketball player (Syracuse Nationals, Milwaukee Hawks) and coach (New York Knicks, St. Louis Bombers).
- William Burley Lockwood, 95, British linguist.
- George Murdock, 81, American actor (Barney Miller, Battlestar Galactica, The X-Files), cancer.
- Billy Neighbors, 72, American football player (Boston Patriots, Miami Dolphins), heart attack.
- Benzion Netanyahu, 102, Israeli historian, academic, and Revisionist Zionist activist, father of Benjamin Netanyahu.
- Arturo Andrés Roig, 89, Argentine philosopher.
- Achala Sachdev, 91, Indian actress.
- Sicelo Shiceka, 45, South African politician, Minister of Cooperative Governance and Traditional Affairs (since 2009).
