= List of Bradford (Park Avenue) A.F.C. players =

Bradford (Park Avenue) A.F.C. is an English semi-professional association football club based in Bradford, West Yorkshire. They were members of the Football League from 1908 to 1970. The following is a list of every Bradford Park Avenue player who appeared in the Football League for the club.

Name	Nation	Career (Note: Refers to seasons played)	Apps	Goals	Notes
Arthur Adey	Scotland	1954–1955	13	4	
George Ainsley	England	1947–1949	44	29	
Alan Alexander	Scotland	1961–1962	5	0	
John Allan	Scotland	1958–1961	70	51	
Jimmy Anders	England	1956–1957, 1960–1962	59	12	
Glen Andrews	England	1967–1969	48	6	
Joe Ashworth	England	1961–1962	3	0	
Charlie Atkinson	England	1956–1964	339	50	
Trevor Atkinson	England	1968–1970	60	6	
Malcolm Bailey	England	1957–1959	10	1	
Joe Baillie	Scotland	1960–1961	7	1	
Gerry Baker	England	1957–1961	16	0	
Bill Barnes	England	1966–1968	53	0	
Ernie Bates	England	1957–1959	44	0	
Fred Batty	England	1955–1959	56	0	
Tony Beanland	England	1969–1970	31	1	
George Beattie	Scotland	1953–1955	53	16	
Jim Begg	Scotland	1953–1955	10	0	
Ronnie Bird	England	1961–1965	129	39	
Sid Blackhall	England	1969–1970	1	0	
Norman Bleanch	England	1961–1962	9	3	
David Blunt	England	1967–1968	2	0	
Mike Booker	England	1968–1969	13	0	
Ken Booth	England	1957–1959	45	14	
Gordon Bradley	United States	1955–1957	18	1	
Peter Brannan	England	1968–1970	42	2	
Dennis Brickley	England	1950–1957	169	24	
Donald Brims	Scotland	1958–1960	76	3	
Jimmy Britton	England	1946–1947	1	0	
Albert Broadbent	England	1965–1967	56	11	
John Brocklehurst	England	1954–1956	47	1	
John Brodie	England	1969–1970	43	0	
Norman Brolls	Scotland	1956–1957	11	0	
George Brown	Scotland	1956–1957	17	2	
Laurie Brown	England	1968–1970	36	1	
Ian Brydon	Scotland	1955–1956	12	3	
John Buchanan	England	1957–1963	164	67	
Trevor Burgin	England	1967–1968	17	0	
Eric Burns	Scotland	1963–1966	28	3	
Ray Byrom	England	1958–1961	70	14	
Dave Cade	England	1959–1960	1	0	
Charlie Calow	Northern Ireland	1952–1953	1	0	
John Cameron	Scotland	1956–1957	3	0	
Danny Campbell	England	1969–1970	10	1	
Pat Carlin	England	1953–1954	6	0	
Graham Carr	England	1969–1970	42	2	
Ray Charnley	England	1969–1970	59	15	
Garry Church	England	1963–1964	4	0	
John Clancy	England	1967–1969	56	2	
Malcolm Clegg	England	1957–1958	6	0	
Keith Cockburn	England	1968–1969	16	1	
Brian Conley	England	1968–1969	13	0	
Dick Conroy	England	1953–1956	57	0	
Malcolm Cook	Scotland	1963–1965	45	2	
Bob Crosbie	Scotland	1949–1953	139	72	
Matt Crowe	Scotland	1952–1954	1	0	
Ken Crowther	England	1948–1949	6	1	
Charlie Currie	Northern Ireland	1949–1954	118	2	
Bob Danskin	England	1932–1948	260	6	
Stuart Darfield	England	1968–1969	17	0	
Dave Davison	Scotland	1946–1947	13	0	
Peter Deakin	England	1966–1967	36	9	
Joby Dean	England	1958–1959	53	1	
Bill Deplidge	England	1946–1956	274	62	
Joe Devlin	Scotland	1958–1959	34	3	

== Sources ==
- Post War English & Scottish Football League A - Z Player's Transfer Database
