= Charles Currie =

Charles Currie may refer to:

- Charles Currie (Jesuit) (1930–2019), American Jesuit and academic administrator
- Charles Currie (civil servant) (died 1878), Indian Civil Service officer in British India
- Charlie Currie (1920–1978), Irish footballer

== See also ==
- Charles Curry (disambiguation)
