= Michaelina =

Michaelina is a given name. Notable people with the given name include:

- Michaelina Argy (born 1962), Australian-born English thalidomide survivor and activist
- Michaelina Bellamy (1952–2012), American singer, dancer, actress and U.S. Air Force Veteran
- Michaelina Wautier (1604–1689), Flemish painter
