= Argy (surname) =

Argy is a surname. Notable people with the surname include:

- Madeline Argy (born 2000), English influencer
- Michaelina Argy (born 1962), Australian-born English thalidomide survivor and activist
