= Bernacchi =

Bernacchi is a surname, and may refer to:

- Antonio Maria Bernacchi (1685–1756), Italian castrato singer
- Brook Bernacchi (1922–1996), Hong Kong lawyer and politician
- Clelia Bernacchi (1910–2006), Italian actress and dubber
- Leonardo Mario Bernacchi (1935–2012), Roman Catholic titular bishop of Tabaicara
- Louis Bernacchi (1876–1942), physicist, astronomer and explorer
- Michael Bernacchi (1911–1983), British colonial administrator
- Mike Bernacchi (born 1965), United States Navy rear admiral
- Piero Bernacchi, Italian journalist and presenter
- Quirico Bernacchi (1914–2006), Italian cyclist
