= Långaryd family =

Large documented Swedish family

The Långaryd family coat of arms

The Långaryd family is one of the largest documented families in the world, according to Guinness World Records (the current world-record holder being the descendants of Confucius). It was noted twice in the Guinness World Records, both for most known relatives (1988) and the largest family reunion (2500 people in 1991, now replaced by another record holder).

The family descended from the churchwarden Nils Andersson (Ackerman) (1620–1717) and his wife Börta (a local variant of Brita) (around 1631–1705) from Våthult in the current Hylte municipality (in southwest Sweden) and includes (unlike the usual) all descendants of him to both male as female part, including some adopted and foster children. The origin of name is that they originally started from Anders Jönsson (1662–1716) who lived in Långaryd the current Gislaved.

== Status 2006 ==
As of 2006 the family has 149,000 registered members (including by marriage); 100,000 are directly descendant from Anders Jönsson; 111,500 are still alive (76,000 of them direct descendant); 99,000 live in Sweden; and 9,000 live in the US. The family makes up 1.1% of the population of Sweden. The only municipality in Sweden they are not represented in is Bjurholm. The family is represented in 48 of 50 states in the US (Delaware and Mississippi missing). The family lives in 60 countries in all continents.

== Famous members ==
=== Royalty ===
- Ferdinand of Liechtenstein (by marriage)
- Hanno von Liechtenstein
- Andreas von Liechtenstein
- Max von Liechtenstein
- Evalena Worthington

=== Politics ===
- Björn Rosengren (s) – former minister of finance (by marriage)
- Jörgen Andersson (s) – former minister of interior and minister of housing
- count Carl B. Hamilton (fp) – professor of economics and member of parliament
- Jan Nygren (s) – former minister (by marriage)
- Mikael Odenberg (m) – former minister of defence

=== Government ===
- Sven-Olof Petersson – diplomat
- Louise Sylwander (born Nordenskiöld)

=== Religion ===
- Carl Block – bishop of Gothenburg
- John Cullberg – bishop of Västerås
- Christina Odenberg – bishop of Lund
- John Bendix – bishop in US Methodism
- Abd al Haqq Kielan – imam and leader of the Muslims in Sweden (by marriage)

=== Science ===
- Hans-Uno Bengtsson – physics at Lunds universitet
- Bodil Jönsson – physics, author. Active at Lunds universitet

=== Music ===
- Joakim Thåström – known from Ebba Grön and Imperiet
- Titiyo Jah – singer
- Magnus Carlsson – singer in Barbados and Alcazar
- Daniel Bellqvist – singer in Eskobar
- William Lind – band leader
- Wollmar Sandell – pianist

=== Theater and movies ===
- Inga Landgré – actor
- Nils Poppe – comic and actor (by marriage)
- Torsten Wahlund – actor (by marriage)
- Andreas Wilson- actor
- Ronny Danielsson – director

=== Art and design ===
- Erland Cullberg – artist
- Hardy Strid – artist
- Claes Bondelid – fashion designer (co-living with a family member)
- Lars Danielsson – artist
- Kristoffer Akselbo – artist, MFA
- Robert Magnusson – Webdesigner

=== Literature ===
- Göran Sonnevi – author

=== Mass media ===
- Sigurd Glans – Aftonbladet
- Maria Schottenius – Dagens Nyheter
- Olle Svenning – journalist and author (by marriage)
- Lars Madsén – radio reporter (by marriage)
- Siewert Öholm – TV producer (by marriage)

=== Finance ===
- Carl Jehander – railway constructor (built 2000 km), engineer, industrialist and member of parliament
- Vincent Bendix – from Chicago, inventor of the self-starting automobile
- Åke Nordlander – executive director of Sveriges verkstadsförening
- Johan Staël von Holstein – entrepreneur

=== Sport ===
- Mats Jingblad – football coach
- Glenn Hysén – football player (by marriage)
- Tobias Hysén – football player, son of Glenn Hysén
- Johan Mjällby – football player (by marriage)
- Michael Svensson – football player
- Christian Wilhelmsson – football player
- Ulf "Tickan" Carlsson – table tennis player
- Peter Karlsson – table tennis player (by marriage)

== Books ==
Year	Author	Name (Swedish )	Name (English)	ISBN	Pages	Other
2006/2010	Per Andersson and Johan Lindhardt	Långarydssläkten: länsman Anders Jönssons i Långaryd ättlingar under tre sekel	The Långaryd family: bailiff Anders Jönssons in Långaryd descendants for three centuries	ISBN 91-87784-17-3	3184	Divided into five books
2002	Per Andersson and Johan Lindhardt	Långarydssläkten: länsman Anders Jönssons i Långaryd ättlingar under tre sekel. Sju nyutforskade grenar	The Långaryd family: bailiff Anders Jönssons in Långaryd descendants for three centuries. Seven new branches explored	ISBN 91-87784-13-0	187	Part of ISBN 91-87784-01-7
1998	Per Andersson and Johan Lindhardt	Långarydssläkten: länsman Anders Jönssons i Långaryd ättlingar under tre sekel	The Långaryd family: bailiff Anders Jönssons in Långaryd descendants for three centuries	ISBN 91-87784-11-4	1064	
1991	Johan Lindhardt	Långarydssläkten: länsman Anders Jönssons i Långaryd ättlingar under tre sekel. Register	The Långaryd family: bailiff Anders Jönssons in Långaryd descendants for three centuries. Index	ISBN 91-87784-01-7 (entire work)	24	
1990	Per Andersson	Långarydssläkten: länsman Anders Jönssons i Långaryd ättlingar under tre sekel	The Långaryd family: bailiff Anders Jönssons in Långaryd descendants for three centuries	ISBN 91-87784-01-7	456	
1988	Per Andersson	Långarydsättlingar: stamtavla över länsman Anders Jönssons i Långaryd descendenter. Nya Långarydsättlingar : supplement med släktnamnsregister	Långaryd Descendants: pedigree of bailiff Anders Jönsson in Långaryd descendent. New Långaryd Descendants: supplementation with the surname register	ISBN 91-86128-14-0, ISBN 91-86128-13-2 (entire work)	68	another title: Nya Långarydsättlingar. Part of ISBN 91-86128-13-2
1988	Per Andersson	Långarydsättlingar: stamtavla över länsman Anders Jönssons i Långaryd descendenter	Långaryd Descendants: pedigree of bailiff Anders Jönsson in Långaryd descendent	ISBN 91-86128-13-2	223	
1988	Per Andersson	Långarydsättlingar: stamtavla över länsman Anders Jönssons i Långaryd descendenter	Långaryd Descendants: pedigree of bailiff Anders Jönsson in Långaryd descendent	ISBN 91-86128-11-6	100	
