= Lars Madsen =

Lars Madsen may refer to:

- Lars Jørgen Madsen (1871–1925), Danish Olympic rifle shooter
- Lars Møller Madsen (born 1981), Danish team handball player
- Lars Madsen (actor) in Magic in Town
- Lars Madsen (cyclist) from Cycling at the 1999 Pan American Games
- Lars Madsén from Långaryd family
