= John Alexander Cameron (disambiguation) =

John Alexander Cameron may refer to:

- John Alexander Cameron (died 1885), Scottish war correspondent
- Jim Cameron (Australian footballer) (1881–1941); full name John Alexander Cameron, Australian rules footballer
- John Cameron (footballer, born 1929) (1929–2008); full name John Alexander Cameron, English footballer
