= James Begg (disambiguation) =

James Begg (1808–1883) was a Scottish minister.

James Begg may also refer to:

- James T. Begg (1877–1963), American politician in Ohio
- James Livingstone Begg (1874–1958), Scottish geologist
- Jim Begg (1920–1987), Scottish footballer
- Jim Begg (actor), actor in Village of the Giants

== See also ==
- James Beggs (disambiguation)
- James "Beag" Stewart
