= Cullberg =

Cullberg can refer to:

- Birgit Cullberg (1908–1999), Swedish choreographer
- Cullberg Ballet, her eponymous company
- Erland Cullberg (1931–2012), Swedish artist
