= Brian Boland =

Brian Boland may refer to:

- Brian Boland (footballer) (1931–2012), Australian rules footballer
- Brian Boland (tennis) (born 1972), American tennis coach
