= Kohrt =

Kohrt is a surname of North German origin. Notable people with the surname include:

- Niklas Kohrt (born 1980), German actor
- Ruth Davis Kohrt (1921–2012), American author
- Holbrook Kohrt (1977–2016), American scientist
