= David Blunt (disambiguation) =

David Blunt may refer to:

- David Blunt (born 1949), English footballer
- David Blunt, 12th Baronet (born 1938) of the Blunt baronets
- David Blunt, List of ambassadors of the United Kingdom to Croatia

== See also ==
- David Blount (born 1967), American senator
- Blunt (surname)
