= Alan Alexander =

Alan Alexander may refer to:

- Alan Alexander (academic) (born 1943), Scottish academic, writer and public servant
- Alan Alexander (footballer) (born 1941), Scottish footballer
