= James Beggs =

James Beggs may refer to:

- James M. Beggs (1926–2020), American executive and NASA administrator
- James Beggs (rower) (1924–2011), American rower

== See also ==
- James Begg (disambiguation)
