= Apostolic Vicariate of Camiri =

Latin Catholic missionary jurisdiction in Bolivia

Apostolic Vicariate of Camiri Apostolicus Vicariatus Cuevensis Vicariato Apostólico de Camiri
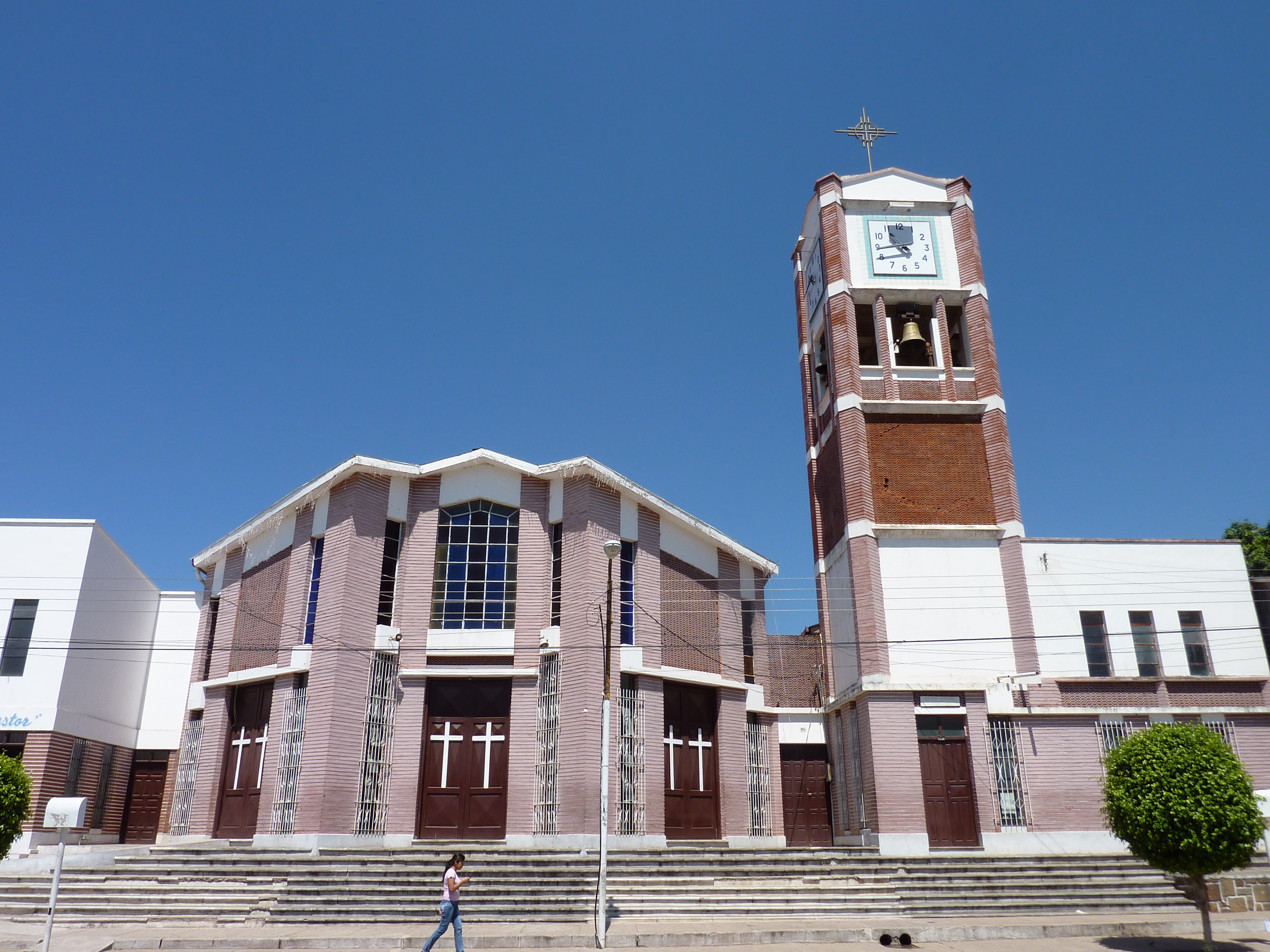
- Cathedral of St. Francis of Assisi

Location
- Country: Bolivia
- Metropolitan: Immediately exempt to the Holy See

Statistics
- Area: 104,000 km^{2} (40,000 sq mi)
- Population: Total; Catholics: (as of 2010); 144,000; 120,000 (83.3%)
- Parishes: 24

Information
- Denomination: Catholic Church
- Sui iuris church: Latin Church
- Rite: Roman Rite
- Established: 22 May 1919 (106 years ago)
- Cathedral: Cathedral of St Francis of Assisi in Camiri

Current leadership
- Pope: Leo XIV
- Apostolic Vicar: Francisco Focardi Mazzocchi

Map

The Vicariate Apostolic of Camiri (Latin: Apostolicus Vicariatus Pandoënsis) is a Latin Church missionary ecclesiastical territory or apostolic vicariate of the Catholic Church in Bolivia. Its cathedra is found in the Cathedral of St. Francis of Assisi in the episcopal see of Camiri.

== History ==
On 22 May 1919 Pope Benedict XV established the Vicariate Apostolic of Chaco from the Diocese of Santa Cruz de la Sierra. The name of the vicariate has subsequently been changed twice. Pope Pius XII changed the name to the Vicariate Apostolic of Cuevo in 1951 and John Paul II gave it its present name in 2003.

== Leadership ==
- Ippolito Ulivelli, O.F.M. † (13 August 1919 – 27 October 1922) Died
- César Angel Vigiani, O.F.M. † (21 January 1924 – 23 January 1950) Resigned
- Cesar Francesco Benedetti, O.F.M. † (8 February 1951 – 18 December 1972) Resigned
- Giovanni Décimo Pellegrini, O.F.M. † (18 December 1972 – 31 October 1992) Died
- Leonardo Mario Bernacchi, O.F.M. † (17 November 1993 – 15 July 2009) Resigned
- Francisco Focardi Mazzocchi, O.F.M. † (15 July 2009 – 2 August 2017) Resigned
- Jesús Galeote Tormo, O.F.M. (22 February 2019 – present)

== See also ==
- Roman Catholicism in Bolivia
