= Francesco Focardi =

Italian priest (1949–2022)

Francesco Focardi Mazzocchi O.F.M.
- Titular Bishop of Cenculiana
- Church: Catholic Church
- In office: 6 June 2007 – 11 January 2022
- Predecessor: Anil Joseph Thomas Couto
- Successor: Dennis E. Spies
- Other posts: Vicar Apostolic of Camiri (2009-2017); Auxiliary Bishop of El Beni o Beni (2007-2009)

Orders
- Ordination: 18 May 1975
- Consecration: 2 September 2007 by Julio Terrazas Sandoval

Personal details
- Born: 9 February 1949 Rignano sull'Arno, Province of Florence, Italy
- Died: 11 January 2022 (aged 72) Santa Cruz, Bolivia

Francesco Focardi Mazzocchi (9 February 1949 – 11 January 2022) was an Italian Roman Catholic prelate, vicar apostolic of Camiri from 2009 to 2017. Focardi died on 11 January 2022, at the age of 72.
