= Amer Al Midani =

Chairman of Manchester Giants basketball team

- Born: 1957; Beirut, Lebanon
- Died: April 2012 (aged 54–55)
- Occupation: Businessman
- Known for: Board member, Manchester United F.C. (1987–2002); Chairman, Manchester Giants

Amer Mouaffac Al Midani (1957 – April 2012) was a member of the board of English football club Manchester United from 1987 to 2002 and chairman of the Manchester Giants basketball team.

Born in Beirut, Lebanon, to a Syrian-Saudi property developer, Mouaffac Al Midani, he was a Lebanese junior table tennis champion at the age of 15, and moved to England at 18. By the mid-1980s, he had become chairman of the Warrington Vikings basketball team. In 1985, he received an approach from Manchester United FC chairman Martin Edwards, who wished to make Manchester United into a multi-sport club; as part of the deal, the Vikings moved from Warrington, Cheshire, to the Stretford Sports Centre in Trafford, Greater Manchester, changed its name to Manchester United Basketball Club, and Al Midani received a seat on the Manchester United board as well as shares in the club. He remained involved with the basketball club even after they separated from Manchester United and became the Manchester Eagles (and subsequently the Manchester Giants), but had left the club by the time it folded in 2001.

In 1991, Al Midani attempted a takeover bid of Manchester United as part of a consortium that included club director and former player Bobby Charlton and would have installed Charlton as chairman, but was put off by Edwards' asking price of £30 million. He retained his shares in the club through its flotation on the London Stock Exchange later that year, but in 1997, Al Midani sold 500,000 shares in Manchester United (0.77% of the club) at around £6 each, causing an 11.5p drop in the share price. In 2002, he left the Manchester United board and was declared bankrupt after running up over £2 million of gambling debts in four days at the Rio hotel in Las Vegas.

He was also a 12 per cent shareholder in Bobby Charlton Enterprises, the main company behind the Bobby Charlton Soccer School and Charlton's ventures into "lunches with legends".

He died in April 2012.
