= Anders Thor =

Swedish scientist

- Anders Thor in 2008
- Born: 4 December 1935; Stockholm
- Died: 7 April 2012 (aged 76); Stockholm
- Education: Royal Institute of Technology
- Known for: Scientific terminology and standardization
- Scientific career
- Fields: Electrical engineering
- Workplaces: Royal Institute of Technology

Anders Johan Thor (1935–2012) was a Swedish scientist and teacher most notable for his leadership in international standardization of quantities and units. He is one of the creators of binary prefixes and the IUPAC Green Book.

Thor obtained a Master of Science degree in electrical engineering in 1959 and the licentiate in mechanics and mathematics in 1964, both at the Royal Institute of Technology (KTH) in Stockholm. From 1962-65 Thor was lecturer in mechanics at KTH and became a professor in 1965.

From 1994 to 2001, Thor was an associate member of the IUPAC Commission on Physicochemical Symbols, Nomenclature and Units (Commission I.1). Thor was Secretary of ISO Technical Committee 12: Quantities and Units from 1982 until 2009, when he was appointed the chairman of the committee. In addition to standards, Thor is a two-time Swedish basketball champion in the 1950s.
