= Mansur Kamaletdinov =

Russian ballet dancer (1926–2012)

Mansur Kamaletdinov (Russian Мансур Фатхинурович Камалетдинов) (7 January 1926 – 19 April 2012) was a Soviet-born ballet dancer, teacher, ballet master and choreographer of classical ballet and classical character dance.

Kamaletdinov was born in Zlatoust, Russia and spent his early childhood in a village near Ufa, Bashkiria, which by coincidence is the same village where the great dancer Rudolf Nureyev grew up.

He attended the Vaganova Academy in St. Petersburg where he studied with many illustrious teachers including Aleksandr Shiryaev, former assistant to Marius Petipa, who codified the art form known as character dance.

Kamaletdinov joined the Kirov Ballet upon graduation and performed with dancers such as Natalia Dudinskaya but was soon invited to join the Tbilisi Ballet and Opera Theater where he worked with the Georgian dance prodigy Vakhtang Chabukiani.

In 1951, Kamaletdinov was invited to join the Bolshoi Ballet as Principal Character Dancer and Teacher where he taught alongside outstanding teachers such as Elizaveta Gerdt. Apart from teaching and performing Classical Dance, Kamaletdinov was Chair of the Character Dance department. He was a choreographer of numerous ballets for the Bolshoi's Russian and International tours and was Ballet Master for many of the Bolshoi's performances. Kamaletdinov was Assistant to the Artistic Director of the Bolshoi Theater, Leonid Lavrovsky, and would substitute as Acting Artistic Director in Lavrovsky's absence. Kamaletdinov worked and toured with, among others, Galina Ulanova and with his close friend and colleague Maya Plisetskaya. He toured the world as one of the "Stars of the Bolshoi" and was a Guest Teacher at the Ballet Nacional de Cuba by invitation of Alicia Alonso. Many of his students became stars of major ballet companies throughout the world. One of Kamaletdinov's former students, Vladimir Vasiliev, became the Artistic Director of the Bolshoi Theater.

In 1976, Kamaletdinov emigrated from the Soviet Union, settling first in Italy and then moving to the United States where he taught and coached at many renowned ballet and opera companies and institutions including Boston Ballet, New York City Ballet, American Ballet Theatre, Juilliard School, Ballets de San Juan, Metropolitan Opera House, Indianapolis Ballet, Richmond Ballet, Hartford Ballet, and many others.

Kamaletdinov died of natural causes on April 19, 2012 at his home in Mt. Lebanon, Pennsylvania.
