= Ernie Bates =

English footballer

Personal information
- Full name: Ernest Bates
- Date of birth: 10 June 1935
- Place of birth: Huddersfield, England
- Date of death: February 1995 (aged 59)
- Place of death: Blackpool, England
- Position: Left back

Senior career*
| Years | Team | Apps | (Gls) |
- Deighton YMCA
| 1955–1957 | Huddersfield Town | 0 | (0) |
| 1957–1959 | Bradford (Park Avenue) | 44 | (0) |
- * Club domestic league appearances and goals

Ernest Bates (10 June 1935 – February 1995) was an English professional footballer who played as a left back for Bradford (Park Avenue).
