= Jean Desmasures =

French field hockey player

Jean-Claude Desmasures
Personal information
- Nationality: French
- Born: 29 August 1928 Paris, France
- Died: 29 April 2012 (aged 83)

Sport
- Sport: Field hockey

Jean-Claude Desmasures (29 August 1928 – 29 April 2012) was a French field hockey player. He competed at the 1952 Summer Olympics in Helsinki and the 1960 Summer Olympics in Rome.
