= Mike Booker =

English footballer

Personal information
- Full name: Michael Booker
- Date of birth: 22 October 1947 (age 79)
- Place of birth: Barnsley, England
- Position: Left back

Senior career*
Years	Team	Apps	(Gls)
1966–1967	Barnsley	2	(0)
1968–1969	Bradford (Park Avenue)	13	(0)
Total		15	(0)
- * Club domestic league appearances and goals

Michael Booker (born 22 October 1947) is an English former professional footballer who played as a left back in the Football League for Barnsley and Bradford (Park Avenue).
