= Dennis De Souza =

Guyanese-born Trinidadian-Canadian pianist

Dennis De Souza (1935–2012) was a Caribbean multi pianist, playing pop, classical and soca/calypso including other music covers in instrumental form. He was born in Demerara area of Guyana. He is of Portuguese descent, but missed the ship to England. Therefore, he settled in Trinidad and Tobago and married a Trinidadian called Angela. He eventually moved to Canada where he lived until his death. De Souza had five children including Dennis Jr and Rhonda De Souza (1962–2000), who was a pop music performer in Trinidad and Tobago back in the late 1970s and early 1980s.
