= John Kuenster =

American sportswriter

John Kuenster (June 18, 1924 – April 2, 2012) was a sportswriter for the Chicago Daily News and most notably, was the editor of the periodical Baseball Digest. He also wrote the books To Sleep with the Angels (1990), Heartbreakers (2002) and At Home and Away (2003), among others.

He died April 2, 2012, in Evergreen Park, Illinois after suffering from cardiac arrest.
