= Madeline Argy =

English influencer (born 2000)

- Born: Madeline Felicity Argy; 7 July 2000 (age 26); West Sussex, England
- Education: University of Kent
- Occupations: Influencer; model; Quenaisance Royal Ambassador
- Years active: 2021–present
- Known for: Pretty Lonesome podcast
- Mother: Michaelina Argy

Madeline Felicity Argy (born 7 July 2000) is an English influencer. She created her TikTok account in 2021 and became known online for her candid storytimes. A video of her talking about a worm inside of her sister's leg went viral in 2022; she was soon signed to United Talent Agency. In 2023, she began hosting the podcast Pretty Lonesome with Madeline Argy through Alex Cooper's Unwell Network. Her on-again, off-again relationship with rapper Central Cee, which began in 2022, has also received media attention.

== Early life ==
Madeline Felicity Argy was born on 7 July 2000 in West Sussex, where she also grew up with her mother and older sister, Jessica. Her mother, Michaelina "Mikey" Argy, was born with shortened arms due to a birth defect from thalidomide, a sleeping pill developed in Germany. Michaelina was awarded an MBE for her efforts to hold the German government accountable for its role in the drug's adverse effects. Madeline's parents divorced when she was young. She was homeschooled for two years of her primary and secondary school education because of her anxiety. In 2018, she began attending the University of Kent for a degree in forensic linguistics, which she was inspired by an episode of the television series Criminal Minds to study. She graduated in 2022. Argy is Jewish through her mother's side.

== Career ==
Argy started her TikTok account during the COVID-19 pandemic and during her last year of university. She posted her first video, a "thirst trap" in which she wiggles her nose and raises her eyebrows, in March 2021. Her first video to do well on the platform was a retelling of her growing out her pubic hairs to meet Queen Elizabeth II as a teenager with her mother, and she found further success with a video about a worm in her sister's leg, which she posted in July 2022, going viral. By 2024, it had over 28 million views. After graduating from university, she signed to United Talent Agency. She also started a YouTube channel in 2022, where she began posting longer videos in which she spoke from inside of her 1996 Vauxhall Astra about self-help. Call Her Daddy host Alex Cooper signed Argy to her podcast network Unwell Network, a subsidiary of her media company Trending meant to cater to Gen Z audiences, upon its launch in August 2023. By September 2023, she had over 4.7 million followers on TikTok. Argy started a conversation-style podcast, Pretty Lonesome with Madeline Argy, with Unwell. Its first episode premiered on Spotify and on Argy's YouTube channel in October 2023. By July 2024, she had over six million followers on TikTok.

In July 2025, Argy was named in Time magazine's inaugural "TIME100 Creators" list – branded by the publication as the 100 most influential digital voices in the world – featuring in the "Entertainers" category for her candid TikTok storytelling and her podcast Pretty Lonesome with Madeline Argy.

== Public image ==
Lydia Venn of Cosmopolitan UK wrote in 2024 that Argy had attained "internet it girl status". Vanity Fair's Delia Cai described her as having a "hallmark overshare-y bestie vibe on TikTok and YouTube" and also called her an "internet it girl". Jade Wickes, for The Face, wrote that she had built a "TikTok empire" and that her USP was "brutally honest, relentlessly candid stories about her life told in quickfire, face-right-up-to-camera sound-bites". CR Fashion Book wrote that she had "carved her niche by embodying realism, openly sharing her thoughts and everyday experiences".

== Personal life ==
Argy is queer, having previously described herself as a bisexual. She came out to her family in 2020. She has stated that she suffered from depression during university. Forbes estimated that she earned more than $1 million from brand deals, including with Netflix, Spotify, and Coach, throughout 2023.

Argy confirmed that she was dating rapper Central Cee, who wrote his July 2022 single "Doja" about Argy, in a TikTok video with him posted in September 2022. She shared on a September 2023 episode of Call Her Daddy that the two had broken up two months prior. The Independent and The Cut described their relationship as on-again, off-again. Argy later alleged in a five-part video series on TikTok posted in July 2024 that the two briefly got back together before Central Cee cheated on her with fellow rapper Ice Spice. She further alleged that the pair's collaborative single, "Did It First", which was released in July 2024 and describes both rappers cheating on their partners, was an admission of Central Cee's infidelity.
