= Muhammad Afrizal =

Indonesian boxer (1981–2012)

Muhammad Afrizal Cotto (September 14, 1981 – April 4, 2012) was an Indonesian featherweight and junior lightweight boxer who became the 28th Indonesian boxer to die since 1948. Previous to Afrizal, the last Indonesian boxing fatality was in 2007. In 2002 the World Boxing Council banned Indonesian boxers from fighting in WBC-sanctioned bouts outside the country, following a series of deaths. The ban was lifted July 2002 on the condition that Indonesia impose safety rules and form a commission to monitor matches.

== Biography ==
Afrizal compiled a professional record of 20-7-1, with eleven knockouts. His final opponent, Irvan Marbun, had a record of 3-1 with one stoppage loss to a winless boxer. Afrizal versus Marbun Indonesian Super Featherweight title bout was conducted on Indosar private television for sports fans. Afrizal was down in the third round, and ultimately lost a 12-round decision. Though he left the ring on his own power, Afrizal subsequently began vomiting an hour after the bout, and fell unconscious with a hemorrhage. He was taken to Royal Hospital in Jakarta, and later transferred to Christian University of Jakarta UKI Hospital, where he died four days after brain surgery to remove a blood clot. Afrizal was engaged and was to be married on April 15, 2012.
