= Mikhail Voronin (fashion designer) =

Ukrainian fashion designer

Mykhailo L. Voronin
- Михайло Львович Воронін
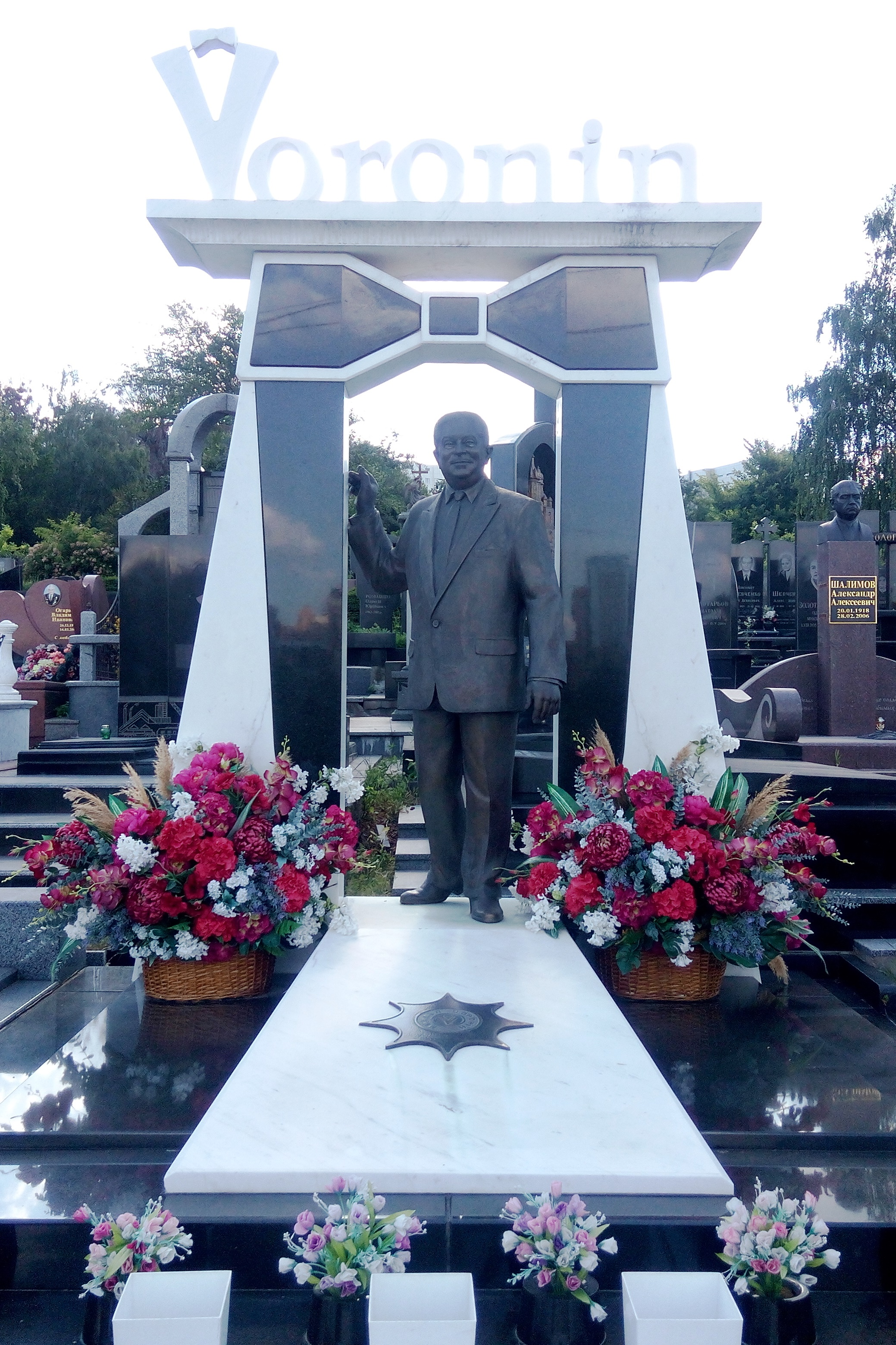
- Voronin in Baikove cemetery
- Born: July 10, 1938; Kyiv, Ukrainian SSR
- Died: April 14, 2012; Kyiv, Ukraine
- Occupation(s): fashion designer, entrepreneur
- Known for: founder of the brand "Michael Voronin" and VORONIN Concern, creator of the zhyletno-maketnoho tailoring method

Mykhailo L. Voronin (Ukrainian: Михайло Львович Воронін; born July 10, 1938, in Kyiv, Ukrainian SSR – April 14, 2012, in Kyiv, Ukraine) was a Ukrainian fashion designer and manufacturer of clothing and was a multiple winner of international competitions of tailoring skills. He was the founder of the brand "Michael Voronin". Voronin (in Cyrillic letters Воронін) stylized as VORONIN Concern, a network of franchised companies specializing in tailoring and marketing of men's clothing. The brand name "Michael Voronin" clothing is sold internationally and the fashion house has taken part in fashion shows worldwide.

== Early life ==
Voronin (variant Mykhailo Voronin) started tailoring when he was just 14 and designed since 1964. In 1972, he graduated from Kiev Technological Institute of Light Industry.

== Career ==
During Soviet times, Voronin worked at a Kyiv knitting factory. Voronin was a successful businessman, academician and innovator and entrepreneur of a unique method of tailoring menswear without fittings, called the zhyletno-maketnoho method, for which he received a patent in 1970. The 1980s led him to establish his own business. In 1985, he established the company "Мода і час" (Fashion and Time). In 1991, he launched "Михайло Воронін" or "Michael Voronin" in Vienna and Paris. Since 1994, the brand is owner of the chain "Zhelan".

Many celebrities have worn the brand. In 2002, a giant tuxedo the height of a three-story building was designed and created by Voronin and was listed in the Guinness Book of Records.
