= Jack Streidl =

American football coach and teacher

Jack Streidl (December 7, 1918 – April 16, 2012) was a high school teacher and athletics coach at Plainwell High School in Plainwell, Michigan from 1945 until his retirement in 1985. He was best known for his abilities as a football coach and he was the first to log 200 victories while coaching at one high school. In 1980 he was inducted into the Western Michigan University Athletic Hall of Fame. In 1987 the Michigan High School Athletic Association conferred on him the Charles E. Forsythe Award, which is given for "outstanding contributions to the interscholastic athletics community." In 2004 he was inducted into the National High School Athletics Coaches Association Hall of Fame. In 1975 the football field at Plainwell High School was first dedicated as Streidl Field in his honor. On October 24, 2008, the football field at Plainwell High School was rededicated as Streidl Field in his honor.
