= Oh Uganda, Land of Beauty =

National anthem of Uganda

- National anthem of Uganda
- Lyrics: George Wilberforce Kakoma, 1962
- Music: George Wilberforce Kakoma, 1962
- Adopted: October 1962; 63 years ago
- Preceded by: "God Save the Queen"

Audio sample
- U.S. Navy Band instrumental version (one verse) in F-sharp/G-flat major: file; help

"Oh Uganda, Land of Beauty" is the national anthem of Uganda. George Wilberforce Kakoma composed the music and authored the lyrics. It was adopted as the national anthem in 1962, when the country gained independence from the United Kingdom. It is musically one of the shortest national anthems in the world. Consequently, multiple verses are sung when it is performed in public.

== History ==
From 1894 until the height of decolonisation during the 1960s, Uganda was a protectorate of the United Kingdom within its colonial empire. In the run up to independence, a subcommittee was formed to determine an anthem for the forthcoming state. It proceeded to hold a nationwide contest, with the criteria they stipulated for the anthem being that it should be "short, original, solemn, praising and looking forward to the future".

In the end, the lyrics and tune composed by George Wilberforce Kakoma were selected in July 1962. He wrote the anthem in one day, having listened on Radio Uganda the night before about how none of the entries received so far had been deemed suitable by the subcommittee. His entry was one of four that was shortlisted. The song was officially adopted in 1962, the year the country gained independence. The first public occasion where the anthem was played was at the celebrations marking independence on 9 October 1962.

Kakoma subsequently sued the government in 2008, claiming that he was never adequately remunerated and thus had rights to over four decades of royalty payments. He alleged that the government gave him a mere USh.2,000/=, equivalent to less than £1 in 2008, as a "token of thanks". Kakoma died before the country's Court of Appeal dismissed the case in 2019, finding that the anthem's copyright vested in the government and not the author.

== Lyrics ==
=== In national languages ===
English lyrics

I
Oh, Uganda! May God uphold thee,
We lay our future in thy hand;
United, free for liberty
together we'll always stand.

II
Oh, Uganda! The land of freedom,
Our love and labour we give;
And with neighbours all at our country's call
In peace and friendship we'll live.

III
Oh, Uganda! The land that feeds us,
By sun and fertile soil grown;
For our own dear land, we shall always stand,
The Pearl of Africa's Crown.

Luganda lyrics

I
O Yuganda! Katonda akuwanirire,
Tussa eby'omumaso byaffe mu mikono gyo,
Mu bwegassi n'obuteefu, ku lw'obumu,
Tujjanga bulijjo kuyimirirawo!

II
O Yuganda! Ensi y'eddembe,
Okwagala n'okulusana tubikuwa,
Ne baliraanwa baffe boona, lw'omulanga gwensi yaffe,
Mu mirembe n'omukwano tunaberawo!

III
O Yuganda! Ensi etuliisa,
Lw'omusana n'obugimu bw'ettaka,
Lw'obugazi bw'ensi yaffe, tujja kuyimirira bulijjo,
Ekimasa ky'amakula ga Afirika!

Swahili lyrics

I
Loo, Uganda! Mungu akusimamie,
Tunaweka mustakabali wetu mikononi mwako;
Umoja, bure kwa uhuru
pamoja tutasimama daima.

II
Loo, Uganda! Ardhi ya uhuru,
Tunatoa upendo wetu na kazi yetu;
Na pamoja na majirani wote katika wito wa nchi yetu
Kwa amani na urafiki tutaishi.

III
Loo, Uganda! Ardhi ambayo hutulisha,
Kwa jua na mchanga wenye rutuba uliopandwa;
Kwa ardhi yetu mpendwa, tutasimama daima,
Lulu ya Taji ya Afrika.

=== In local languages ===
Along with the Luganda and Swahili translations, the national anthem has also been translated into several other local languages.

== Composition ==
At only eight bars long, (Note: Some sources incorrectly state that the anthem is nine bars long. This is because the pickup bar at the beginning of the song is only a partial measure and thus not counted as a complete bar.) "Oh Uganda, Land of Beauty" is musically one of the shortest national anthems in the world, together with Japan's anthem. Both Michael Bristow, the editor of the book National Anthems of the World, and Philip Sheppard have identified Uganda's national anthem as the shortest. As a result, multiple verses are typically sung when it is performed at public events like international football games.
