= Keith Cockburn =

English footballer

Personal information
- Full name: Keith Cockburn
- Date of birth: 2 September 1948 (age 78)
- Place of birth: Barnsley, England
- Position: Winger

Senior career*
Years	Team	Apps	(Gls)
1966–1968	Barnsley	1	(0)
1968–1969	Bradford Park Avenue	16	(1)
1969–1970	Grimsby Town	19	(2)
1970–197?	Bangor City		
- * Club domestic league appearances and goals

Keith Cockburn (born 2 September 1948) is an English professional footballer who played as a winger.
