= Clément Haeyen =

Belgian weightlifter

Personal information
- Born: 13 June 1927 Bruges, West Flanders, Belgium
- Died: 20 April 2012 (aged 84) Bruges, West Flanders, Belgium

Sport
- Sport: Weightlifting

Clément Haeyen (13 June 1927 – 20 April 2012) was a Belgian weightlifter. He competed at the 1960 Summer Olympics.
