= Murtaza Razvi =

Pakistani journalist (1964–2012)

- Born: 17 December 1964; Lahore, Pakistan
- Died: 19 April 2012 (aged 47); Karachi, Pakistan
- Occupation: Journalist
- Known for: Candid and fearless journalism
- Notable credit: Villanova University alumni

Murtaza Razvi (17 December 1964 – 19 April 2012) was a senior Pakistani journalist with Dawn newspaper, Karachi, Pakistan.

Besides Urdu language and English, he knew German, French, Hindi and Persian languages.

== Biography ==
Murtaza Razvi held master's degrees in Ancient Indian and Islamic History (University of the Punjab, Lahore) and Political Science & International Relations (Villanova University, Villanova, PA, USA). In 2009, Murtaza supervised the huge task of merging four Dawn newspaper magazines – Sunday Magazine, The Review, Images and Gallery – into what is Images Magazine in 2025.

Murtaza Razvi served as the Resident Editor of Dawn, Lahore (2005–2007) and had worked there for over 10 years. He had also worked as a columnist and political analyst of the Indian Express newspaper. Murtaza had worked in the field of journalism for over two decades.

== Death ==
He was found murdered in Karachi on 19 April 2012. The police also found a rope which apparently was used for strangulation. There were torture marks on his body, and his hands were tied.

One of the editors of Dawn newspaper, Badar Alam, who was his colleague as well, reportedly said after his murder: "He knew everything about Urdu and Persian literature and poetry. He was a very cultured man...He was like a brother and a mentor to me. He was always willing to own up to his mistakes and improve".

Faysal Quraishi, a noted Pakistani television and media personality, who was with him in Lahore when Murtaza was resident editor there, said, "He was both understanding and generously accommodating when it came to handling tricky situations. We had an ideal, cordial work relationship and I will miss him".

Veteran newspaper journalist Zaffar Abbas reportedly said, "Murtaza was a generous friend and a highly talented journalist. In his death, the journalist fraternity has lost a fearless writer".

Among his survivors, in 2012, were his wife Shahrezad Samiuddin, three minor daughters: Maya, Priya and Dina.

== Works ==
- Musharraf: the years in power (political biography of the former Pakistan President, General Pervez Musharraf; New Delhi, 2009, HarperCollins)
- Ordinary People (interviews with ordinary citizens of Pakistan about history, society, culture, etc.; Lahore, 1995, Progressive Publishers)

During his last days, he was working on the books Pittho's World & Other Stories (fiction, HarperCollins) and Pakistan Uncut (non-fiction, HarperCollins).
