= George Wilberforce Kakoma =

Ugandan composer of the national anthem (1923–2012)

- Born: 27 July 1923; Mengo, Uganda
- Died: 8 April 2012 (aged 88); Kampala, Uganda
- Education: Durham University
- Occupation: Composer
- Notable work: "Oh Uganda, Land of Beauty"

George Wilberforce Kakoma (27 July 1923 – 8 April 2012) was a Ugandan musician who wrote and composed "Oh Uganda, Land of Beauty", Uganda's national anthem. Kakoma's composition was first played publicly by the Police Band conducted by Mr. John Moon on October 9, 1962 during Uganda's Independence Day Celebrations. He received a personal token of UGX 2,000 from the Prime Minister Milton Obote for his work.

== Early life and education ==
Kakoma was born in 1923 to Semu Kyasooka Kakoma, a Gombolola Chief and Solome Mboolanyi Kakoma in what is now Wakiso District Uganda's Mengo town council. He attended Mengo Primary School and later King's College Budo, where he was a brother-in-law and a contemporary of Sir Edward Mutesa II. He was an active choir member and a keen sportsman during his school days. He studied Music at the Royal Conservatory of Music in Nairobi and later at the Royal College of Music in London, before pursuing further studies at the University of Durham in Northern England. He graduated from the Trinity College of Music and Durham University.

Through his wife Maria Theresa Kakoma George Wilberforce Kakoma is survived by his children, grandchildren and great grandchildren.

== Career ==
The Ugandan national anthem, which Kakoma wrote and composed.

Prior to Uganda's independence, three sub-committees were established to deal with creating Uganda's national symbols. The sub-committee for the creation of a national anthem encouraged Ugandans to submit their proposals.

"The compositions had to be short, original, solemn, praising and looking forward to the future. They had to be harmonised in the usual four parts-soprano, alto, tenor and bass," said Kakoma in an interview.

In July 1962, the committee chose Kakoma's composition. It had taken him a day to compose the music and write the lyrics for "Oh Uganda, Land of Beauty".

Kakoma worked as a music teacher in the Masaka District.

== Awards ==
Kakoma is a recipient of numerous awards, including the National Independence Medal in 2010. Apart from the National Anthem, he contributed to the composition of the East African Community Anthem in 2005. He also composed the Uganda Wildlife Authority anthem.

== Later life and death ==
Kakoma died on Easter, April 8, 2012 in Kampala's Kololo suburb, aged 89.

== Publications ==
- George W. Kakoma, Songs from Buganda, Univ. of London Press, London 1969, ISBN 0-340-09438-9
