= Charles Barron (playwright) =

Scottish writer, teacher and lecturer (1936–2012)

Charles Aitken Barron (11 January 1936 – 28 April 2012) was a Scottish writer, playwright, teacher and lecturer. He wrote primarily in Doric (Dialect from the North East, derived from old Scots.)

== Early life and education ==
Barron was born in Aberdeen, Scotland. He attended Robert Gordon's College.

== Career ==
Barron's play "Fooshion", won the 'Total Oil Scottish Playwright's Award'. Also, his play "Amang the Craws" won the 'Doric Festival Playwriting Award' as well as being used by Learning & Teaching Scotland for use by Higher English/Drama candidates throughout Scotland. His plays have been used/performed by Edinburgh Theatre Workshop, Annexe Theatre of Glasgow, Dragon Productions of Glasgow, Pitlochry Theatre, Haddo House and Fleeman Productions of Aberdeen. However, he has not only written plays, his son-et-lumieres have been performed at sites all over Scotland.

Charles Barron died on 28 April 2012 at the age of 76. After a two-day stint in Aberdeen Royal Infirmary he died due to pancreatitis leading to multi-organ failure. Aberdeen Universary and Fleeman Productions have offered three prizes in his name for plays written in Doric.
