= Ismail Haron =

- Born: 13 May 1946; Singapore
- Origin: Singapore
- Died: April 9, 2012 (aged 65) Singapore
- Genres: Malay, rock
- Years active: 1972–1982
- Labels: EMI

Ismail Haron (full name: Ismail bin Harun, 13 May 1946 – 9 April 2012) was a Singaporean singer. He is often dubbed the "Tom Jones of Singapore".

== Biography ==
Haron was born in Killiney Road, Singapore. The first group he joined was Valiants. He was with them for only a few months. Then he teamed up with Vigilantes some of whom were his secondary school classmates, to record their first EP under the Eagle label, with a series of Malay songs adapted from English hits, namely "Senyuman Terakhir" ("Green Green Grass Of Home"), "Pulang Pada-Ku", "Mari Sayang" ("Hang On Sloopy") and "Mari Menari" ("La Bamba").

Ismail was actually the second vocalist for The Vigilantes. The first vocalist for this band was a Singaporean Peranakan singer, Solo Chu, with his only album containing songs "Kau Tinggal-kan Diri-ku", "Jangan Salah Sangka", "Di-Goda Kenangan" and "Harapan Hati Kaseh".

Prior to this, The Vigilantes was an instrumental band with Eagle Records and had managed to record an EP with songs "Till We Meet Again", "I Fell Into A Trance", "Love In Bloom" and "Reminiscence".

Meanwhile, The Vigilantes had decided to change their name to "The Guys" due to changes in the bands' line-up and the style of their music performance.

A few more EPs were released in later part of 1968 and early 1969.

Ismail Haron also recorded four English songs with The Guys in one EP under EMI- "My Elusive Dreams", "The Rose", "A Minute Of Your Time" and "Hungry For Love".

In 1970, Ismail Haron embarked for a solo career with his first solo EP under EMI titled "Kehilangan Chinta" ("Without Love").

Then they came back to Singapore and continued playing the clubs in 1971 and 1972. The band changed personnel at this time. Various members came and went. Finally, the group broke up.

Ismail continued to record a few more solo albums - "Ismail Haron & Maria" (1972), "Ilham Pujangga" (1972), "Ismail Haron" (1972), "Antara Pujangga Dan Insan Biasa" (1973), "Sutra Mulia" (1974), "Hulurkan Tangan" (1975) and "Potret Sindiran" (1975). Among his popular hits within these periods were "Dendam-ku Kerana Maria" ("I Did What I Did For Maria"), "Antara Anak Dan Ayah" ("My Boy"), "Tolong Damai-kan" ("Mammy Blue"), "Ilham Pujangga", "Wati", "Persembahan-ku", "Hey Hey Sunny", "Junainah", "Kehilangan Chinta" and "Apa Khabar Sayang" ("Hello Darling").

Between 1972 and 1976, Ismail Haron recorded a few duet songs with diva Anita Sarawak. Songs include "Alam Terpuja" ("You Make Me Feel Brand New"), "Rahsia-Mu Rahsia-Ku" ("Sealed With A Kiss"), "Janji Tetap Janji" ("My Girl"), "Gabus Tarbus" ("House Of Bamboo"), "Asmara", "Rahsia Di-Ayer Jerneh", "Menunggu Nasi Minyak" and "Kesah Dol dan Minah".

In an interview with Malaysian daily Utusan Malaysia, Ismail Haron mentioned that he plans to migrate to Kuantan, the east-coast city of peninsular Malaysia, as a permanent resident to continue with his singing career. He died in his sleep at the residence of his sister, Hamidah, in Jurong West, at 2pm on 9 April 2012, Monday.

== Review ==
Ismail Haron was acclaimed a celebrity by the Malay music buffs in Singapore & Malaysia. Because of his deep husky voice, he was called the Tom Jones of Singapore, and his voice is reminiscent of the English legendary singer.

== Discography ==
=== Albums ===
- Ismail Haron & Maria (1972)
- Ilham Pujangga (1972)
- Ismail Haron (1972)
- Antara Pujangga Dan Insan Biasa (1973)
- Sutra Mulia (1974)
- Hulurkan Tangan (1975)
- Potret Sindiran (1975)

=== Duets with Anita Sarawak ===
- Alam Terpuja (You Make Me Feel Brand New)
- Rahsia-Mu Rahsia-Ku (Sealed With A Kiss)
- Janji Tetap Janji (My Girl)
- Gabus Tarbus (House Of Bamboo)
- Asmara
- Rahsia Di-Ayer Jerneh
- Menunggu Nasi Minyak
- Kesah Dol dan Minah
