= Robert Magnusson =

Robert Magnusson from the University of Texas at Arlington, TX was named Fellow of the Institute of Electrical and Electronics Engineers (IEEE) in 2014 for contributions to the invention of a new class of nanophotonic devices.
