= Elsa Abuin =

Argentine chemist (1942–2012)

- Born: 13 December 1942; Buenos Aires, Argentina
- Died: 18 April 2012 (aged 69)
- Occupation: Physical chemist
- Awards: Guggenheim Fellowship (1987)

Academic background
- Education: University of Buenos Aires; Technical University of the State
- Thesis: Fotoquímica de cetonas alifáticas en fase gaseosa (1974)
- Doctoral advisor: Eduardo Lissi

Academic work
- Discipline: Physical chemistry
- Sub-discipline: Chemical kinetics
- Institutions: University of Chile

Elsa Beatriz Abuin Saccomano (13 December 1942 – 18 April 2012) was an Argentine chemist. After fleeing the country due to La Noche de los Bastones Largos, she became a professor at University of Chile. A 1987 Guggenheim Fellow, she specialized in physical chemistry, especially in chemical kinetics.

== Biography ==
Elsa Beatriz Abuin Saccomano was born on 13 December 1942 in Buenos Aires, Argentina. After getting her BS in chemistry at the University of Buenos Aires in 1966, she intended to do her graduate studies in Argentina, before her research group fled the country due to the La Noche de los Bastones Largos. Led by Juan Grotewold and Eduardo Lissi, the Grotewold-Lissi group later settled at the Technical University of the State (UTE), where she was a professor at the Department of Engineering and got her PhD in chemistry in 1974; her dissertation Fotoquímica de cetonas alifáticas en fase gaseosa was supervised by Lissi, and they would later author well over a dozen articles together afterwards.

Originally a teaching assistant, she later remained in TUE as part of their Kinetics and Photochemistry research group, as well as a full professor of chemistry, as a research scientist, and as director of the Faculty of Chemistry and Biology's graduate program. She also spent time abroad as a visiting professor at the National University of Río Cuarto and University of São Paulo.

As an academic, she specialized in physical chemistry, especially in chemical kinetics. In 1987, she published Macromoleculas en Solución, a UNESCO monograph. A long time contributor to the University of Santiago's series on physical chemistry books, she edited the fourth volume, which was published after her death in 2013. The journal Photochemistry and Photobiology said that she "was, without any doubt, a pillar in the development and consolidation of the chemical sciences in Chile".

In 1987, she was awarded a Guggenheim Fellowship for "a study of fluorescence probing of colloidal particles". she was the first Chilean woman to receive the fellowship. As part of the Fellowship, she did research in North America at the University of Rochester and University of Ottawa, the latter of where she worked under Tito Scaiano.

She also co-founded the Encuentros Latinoamericanos de Fotoquímica y Fotobiología conference and was an organizer as late as the 2010 conference.

Abuin died on 18 April 2012. Photochemistry and Photobiology published a special memorial issue dedicated to Abuin.
