= Malcolm Cook =

Scottish footballer (born 1943)

Personal information
- Full name: Malcolm Ian Cook
- Date of birth: 24 May 1943 (age 83)
- Place of birth: Glasgow, Scotland
- Position: Wing half

Youth career
- St Roch's

Senior career*
Years	Team	Apps	(Gls)
1961–1963	Motherwell	0	(0)
1963–1965	Bradford Park Avenue	45	(2)
1965–1966	Newport County	32	(0)
- Margate
Total		77	(2)
- * Club domestic league appearances and goals

Malcolm Ian Cook (born 24 May 1943) is a Scottish former professional football player and coach.

== Career ==
Born in Glasgow, Cook played as a wing half for St Roch's, Motherwell, Bradford Park Avenue, Newport County and Margate.

After retiring as a player, Cook became a coach, working with Kenny Dalglish at Liverpool.
