= Wayne Aiken =

Canadian football player

Profile
- Positions: Halfback, Linebacker

Personal information
- Born: August 5, 1935; Kingston, Ontario, Canada
- Died: April 27, 2012 (aged 76); Calgary, Alberta, Canada
- Listed height: 6 ft 1 in (1.85 m)
- Listed weight: 190 lb (86 kg)

Career information
- University: British Columbia

Career history
- 1959–1960: Calgary Stampeders

Wayne Stuart Aiken (August 5, 1935 – April 27, 2012) was a Canadian professional football halfback and linebacker who played for the Calgary Stampeders of the Canadian Football League. He played in 14 regular season games in 1959 and 1960. On defense, he recorded two tackles and three interceptions. On offense, he rushed three times for three total yards. He also participated on special teams as a punt returner, receiving 12 punts for 58 return yards.
