= Richard Okada =

American Japanologist (1945–2012)

Hideki Richard Okada (2 July 1945 – 4 April 2012) was Professor of Japanese at Princeton University, in the East Asian Studies Department. He was a specialist in the Tale of Genji, and his most recent work was editing a three-volume collection of academic essays about the novel. His doctoral degree was from the University of California, Berkeley.

His 1977 doctoral thesis, Sagoromo monogatari: a study and partial translation, has been called "one of the most important contributions to the study of classical Japanese narrative to have emerged in the last twenty years " by Richard Bowring of the University of Cambridge.

He died of natural causes on 4 April 2012 in Monmouth Junction, New Jersey.

On 20 May 2017, an independent report commissioned by St. Paul's School named Okada as one of thirteen adults at the school against whom substantiated instances of sexual misconduct had been documented.

== Publications ==
=== Books ===
- Okada, H. Richard. Figures of resistance: language, poetry, and narrating in The tale of Genji and other mid-Heian texts. Durham: Duke University Press, 1991. ISBN 0-8223-1185-2 In over 200 North American academic libraries, according to WorldCat
- Okada, H. Richard, ed. The Tale of Genji. London: Routledge, 2009.3 vols. ISBN 978-0-415-47900-4

== Other publications ==
- 『地球／惑星文学としての物語の可能性と行方』(“ The Possibility and Future of monogatari as Planetary Literature”),
- “The Possibility and Impossibility of Zainichi in GO,”
- 『翻訳・コスモロジー・ジェンダー』 (“Translation, Cosmology, and Gender”).
- "Domesticating the Tale of Genji, by Richard H. Okada 1990 Journal of the American Oriental Society, Vol. 110, No. 1 (Jan. - Mar., 1990), pp. 60-70 JStor
- "Translation and Difference--A Review Article" Journal of Asian Studies, Vol. 47, No. 1 (Feb., 1988), pp. 29-40 JSTOR
- "Areas, Disciplines, and Ethnicities" in Miyoshi, Masao. Learning Places: The Afterlives of Area Studies. Durham [u.a.]: Duke University Press, 2002. p. 190-205
