= Charles Currie (Jesuit) =

American academic administrator (1930–2019)

Personal details
- Born: 1930 Philadelphia, Pennsylvania, U.S.
- Died: January 4, 2019 (aged 88) Washington, D.C., U.S.
- Education: Fordham University; Boston College; Catholic University of America

Charles Currie, S.J., (1930 – January 4, 2019) was an American Jesuit and academic administrator. He served as the president of Wheeling Jesuit University and Xavier University. He was also the chair of the Association of Jesuit Colleges and Universities from 1997 to 2011.
