= Lenny Gault =

American singer-songwriter

- Born: August 16, 1942 (age 82); Blandburg, Pennsylvania
- Origin: Oregon, U.S.
- Genres: Country
- Occupation: Singer
- Instrument(s): Vocals, guitar
- Years active: 1974–80
- Labels: MRC Records

Chester Leonard Lenny Gault (August 16, 1942) is an American country music singer. He released at least five singles, three of which charted. In 1993, he was reported to be serving as a pastor in Blandburg, Pennsylvania.

== Discography ==
=== Singles ===
Year	Single	Peak positions
Year	Single	US Country
1977	"Without Music"	—
1978	"Turn on the Bright Lights"	87
1978	"I Just Need a Coke (To Get the Whiskey Down)"	78
1979	"The Honky-Tonks Are Calling Me Again"	89
1979	"Have a Good Day"	—
