= Sid Blackhall =

English footballer

Personal information
- Full name: Sidney Blackhall
- Date of birth: 25 September 1945 (age 81)
- Place of birth: Ashington, England
- Position: Centre forward

Senior career*
Years	Team	Apps	(Gls)
1967–1969	Bradford (Park Avenue)	1	(0)
- Ashington
- * Club domestic league appearances and goals

Sidney Blackhall (born 25 September 1945) is an English former professional footballer who played as a centre forward for Bradford (Park Avenue).
