= Chitturi Satyanarayana =

Indian surgeon

Chitturi Satyanarayana (6 October 1913 – 19 April 2012) was an Indian ENT surgeon who served in the post of Honorary Surgeon to the President of India.
