= Charles Curry =

Charles Curry may refer to:

- Charles F. Curry (1858–1930), U.S. representative from California and chairman of the Committee on Territories
- Charles F. Curry Jr. (1893–1972), U.S. representative from California, member of the Seventy-second Congress of U.S.
- Charles Madison Curry (1869–1944), professor of literature at Indiana State Normal School

== See also ==
- Charles Currie (disambiguation)
