= Nancy Beckage =

American entomologist

Nancy Elizabeth Beckage

Nancy Elizabeth Beckage (September 10, 1950 – April 1, 2012) was an American entomologist known for her work on host–parasitoid interactions. She held professorships in entomology and in cell biology and neuroscience at the University of California, Riverside.

== Biography ==
Born in El Paso, Texas in 1950, Beckage soon moved to Virginia where she attended Walsingham Academy in Williamsburg. Her first degree was split between the College of William and Mary, Williamsburg (1968–70) and the University of Wisconsin–Madison (1970–72), specializing in zoology. From 1973, she studied at the University of Washington, initially under Arthur Martin but subsequently with Lynn Riddiford, gaining her PhD in 1980. Her thesis was entitled "Physiology of developmental interaction between the tobacco hornworm Manduca sexta and its endoparasite Apanteles congregatus".

After holding a post-doctoral position in Riddiford's laboratory, in 1982 Beckage established her own laboratory at the Issaquah Biomedical Research Institute, Issaquah, Washington, which moved in 1986 to Seattle, becoming the Seattle Biomedical Research Institute (now the Center for Global Infectious Disease Research). In 1987, she joined the United States Department of Agriculture (USDA) at the University of Wisconsin, Madison. She moved to the Department of Entomology at the University of California, Riverside (UCR) in 1990, and stayed at that university until her retirement in 2010 or 2011, when she held professorships both in entomology and in cell biology and neuroscience. She edited or co-edited four academic books, as well as several proceedings from symposia.

She died on April 1, 2012, aged 61.

== Research ==
Her thesis was on the parasitoid wasp, Apanteles congregatus (now Cotesia congregata), and its host, the moth Manduca sexta, whose larva is known as the tobacco hornworm. Her subsequent research continued to focus on this interaction, using it as a model for how parasitoids can alter the physiology and behavior of the host larva. The stated Goal of this research was to gain insights towards the possible viability of formulating the regulatory endocrine molecules produced by the parasitoid wasps into a more natural, environmentally safe, Pesticide alternative.

== Awards, honors and legacy ==
Beckage was an elected fellow of the American Association for the Advancement of Science (2004) and received an honorary doctorate degree from ETH Zurich, Switzerland (2008). A one-day symposium, "Remembering the Life and Work of Nancy Beckage", was organized by the Entomological Society of America on November 11, 2012. The Nancy E. Beckage Scholarship for Women in Entomology, now the Nancy Beckage Young Women in Science Fund, was established by the Entomological Foundation in her memory, and honors her commitment to encouraging women to study entomology.

== Selected publications ==
Edited books

- N. E. Beckage, J. Drezen, eds. Parasitoid Viruses: Symbionts and Pathogens (Academic Press/Elsevier; 2012)
- N. E. Beckage, ed. Insect Immunology (Academic Press/Elsevier; 2008)
- N. E. Beckage, ed. Parasites and Pathogens: Effects on Host Hormones and Behavior (Chapman & Hall; 1997)
- N. E. Beckage, S. N. Thompson, B. A. Federici, eds. Parasites and Pathogens of Insects, Vol. 1: Parasites, Vol. 2: Pathogens (Academic Press; 1993)

Review

- Nancy E. Beckage; Dale B. Gelman (2004), "Wasp parasitoid disruption of host development: Implications for new biologically based strategies for insect control", Annual Review of Entomology, 49: 299–330, doi:10.1146/annurev.ento.49.061802.123324, PMID 14651466

Research papers

- Nancy E. Beckage; Frances F. Tan; Kathleen W. Schleifer; Roni D. Lane; Lisa L. Cherubin (1994), "Characterization and biological effects of cotesia congregata polydnavirus on host larvae of the tobacco hornworm, manduca sexta", Insect Biochemistry and Physiology, 26 (2–3): 165–95, doi:10.1002/arch.940260209
- Nancy E. Beckage; Lynn M. Riddiford (1982), "Effects of parasitism by Apanteles congregatus on the endocrine physiology of the tobacco hornworm Manduca sexta", General and Comparative Endocrinology, 47 (3): 308–22, doi:10.1016/0016-6480(82)90238-6, PMID 7106552
- Nancy E. Beckage; Lynn M. Riddiford (1978), "Developmental interactions between the tobacco hornworm Manduca sexta and its braconid parasite Apanteles congregatus", Entomologia Experimentalis et Applicata, 23 (2): 139–51, Bibcode:1978EEApp..23..139B, doi:10.1111/j.1570-7458.1978.tb03016.x, S2CID 83919666
