= Norman Bleanch =

English footballer

Personal information
- Full name: Norman Wesley Swan Bleanch
- Date of birth: 19 August 1940 (age 86)
- Place of birth: Houghton-le-Spring, England
- Position: Centre forward

Senior career*
Years	Team	Apps	(Gls)
- Willington
1960–1961	West Ham United	0	(0)
1961–1962	Southend United	3	(0)
1961–1962	Bradford (Park Avenue)	9	(3)
- Kings Lynn
Total		12	(3)
- * Club domestic league appearances and goals

Norman Wesley Swan Bleanch (born 19 August 1940) is an English former professional footballer who played as a centre forward for Southend United and Bradford (Park Avenue).
