= Charlie Currie =

Irish footballer

Personal information
- Full name: Charles Currie
- Date of birth: 17 April 1920
- Place of birth: Belfast, Ireland
- Date of death: April 1978 (aged 57–58)
- Place of death: Belfast, Northern Ireland
- Position: Half back

Senior career*
Years	Team	Apps	(Gls)
19??–1944	Cliftonville		
1944–1949	Belfast Celtic		
1949–1954	Bradford Park Avenue	118	(2)
1954	Derry City		
1954–1955	Crusaders		

International career
1947–1949	Irish League XI	6	
- * Club domestic league appearances and goals

Charles Currie (17 April 1920 – April 1978) was an Irish professional footballer who made 118 appearances in the English Football League for Bradford Park Avenue. He also played Irish League football for Cliftonville, Belfast Celtic, Derry City and Crusaders. While a Belfast Celtic player, Currie played six times for the Irish League representative team between 1947 and 1949. He began his career playing at centre half, but went on to play at right half, right back and occasional centre forward.

== Life and career ==
Currie was born in Belfast in 1920. He played football for amateur club Cliftonville before joining Belfast Celtic in 1944. He acted as backup to Jack Vernon before taking over as first-team centre half in 1947 when Vernon left the club. Currie played in the 1947 Irish Cup Final, in which Belfast Celtic beat Glentoran 1–0, and went on to play six times for the Irish League representative team between 1947 and 1949. He was a member of the Belfast Celtic tour party that visited the United States and Canada in 1949. Among their results was a 2–0 win against the Scotland team that had just won the 1948–49 British Home Championship. A tour brochure described him as "a powerful defensive pivot with a high sense of keeping his position and of quick clearance".

On their return, Currie signed for English Second Division club Bradford Park Avenue for a fee reported as anything between £6,000 and £10,000. In November, he missed out on selection for the Ireland team to face England because of injury. He was under consideration over the next year or so but never selected.

Playing more at right half than in the centre, and sometimes leading the attack, Currie was appointed captain of the Bradford team and took his appearance total up past the 100 mark. At the beginning of the 1953–54 season, the club suspended him for a month for going absent without leave from pre-season training. At the end of that season, he was transfer listed, and returned to Irish League football with Derry City for a "moderate" fee. He made a positive start, but his form dipped, and in November he was allowed to leave for Crusaders for an undisclosed fee. During his time with Crusaders he scored a hat-trick playing as a makeshift centre forward against East Belfast in a County Antrim Shield tie.

In later life Currie and his wife lived in Owenvarragh Park in the Andersonstown district. He died in Belfast in April 1978 after a long illness.
