= David Blunt =

English footballer

Personal information
- Date of birth: 29 April 1949 (age 75)
- Place of birth: Goldthorpe, England
- Position(s): Inside forward

Senior career*
Years	Team	Apps	(Gls)
1967–1968	Bradford (Park Avenue)	2	(0)
1968–1969	Chester	0	(0)
- *Club domestic league appearances and goals

David Blunt (born 29 April 1949) is an English former professional footballer who played as an inside forward in the Football League for Bradford (Park Avenue).
