= Pat Carlin =

English footballer

Personal information
- Date of birth: 17 December 1929
- Place of birth: Dunscroft, England
- Date of death: 8 April 2012 (aged 82)
- Place of death: Doncaster, England
- Position: Right-back

Senior career*
Years	Team	Apps	(Gls)
- Dunscroft
1953–1954	Bradford Park Avenue	6	(0)
- * Club domestic league appearances and goals

Patrick Carlin (17 December 1929 – 8 April 2012) was an English professional footballer who played as a right-back for Bradford Park Avenue.
