= Jim Begg =

Scottish footballer

Personal information
- Full name: James Alexander Begg
- Date of birth: 14 February 1930
- Place of birth: Dumfries, Scotland
- Date of death: 10 April 1987 (aged 57)
- Place of death: Liverpool, England
- Position: Goalkeeper

Senior career*
Years	Team	Apps	(Gls)
- Auchinleck Talbot
1952–1953	Liverpool	0	(0)
1953–1955	Bradford (Park Avenue)	10	(0)
- * Club domestic league appearances and goals

James Alexander Begg (14 February 1930 – 10 April 1987) was a Scottish professional footballer who played as a goalkeeper for Bradford (Park Avenue).
