= John Cameron (footballer, born 1929) =

Scottish footballer

Personal information
- Full name: John Alexander Cameron
- Date of birth: 29 November 1929
- Place of birth: Greenock, Scotland
- Date of death: 13 July 2008 (aged 78)
- Place of death: Greenock, Scotland
- Position: Wing-half

Senior career*
Years	Team	Apps	(Gls)
1954–1956	Motherwell	6	(0)
1956–1957	Bradford Park Avenue	3	(0)
- * Club domestic league appearances and goals

John Alexander Cameron (29 November 1929 – 13 July 2008) was an English professional footballer who played as a wing-half for Motherwell and Bradford (Park Avenue).
