= Michaelina Argy =

English thalidomide survivor and activist

Michaelina "Mikey" Argy MBE (born 26 August 1962) is an Australian born English thalidomide survivor and activist. She has chaired the National Advisory Committee of the Thalidomide Trust, advised BBC producers for drama storylines covering thalidomide survivors and was appointed MBE in 2015.

== Early life ==
Argy is a thalidomide survivor and is from a Jewish family. She was born on 26 August 1962 in Melbourne, Australia to parents who were British immigrants who came to Australia through the Assisted Passage Migration Scheme, known colloquially as "ten pounds poms." She had two elder siblings.

Before her birth, Argy's mother was prescribed thalidomide to ease her morning sickness. Due to the drug, developed by German pharmaceutical company Grünenthal, Argy was born with foreshortened arms and suffers from acute back pain. The drug was later withdrawn from use after it was found to harm the development of unborn babies.

By when Argy was three years old, her mother had been admitted into a mental institution and Argy did not see her again until she was 13. When she was six years old, Argy's father moved the family to England and he raised the children as a single father. Her father remarried, then died when she was fifteen years old.

Argy attended Michael Hall, a Rudolf Steiner school in Ashdown Forest, Sussex, with her siblings, then trained as a computer programmer at Queen Elizabeth's Vocational College for the Disabled. She worked briefly for the Civil Service.

== Activism ==
Argy is a past chair of the National Advisory Committee of the Thalidomide Trust, the organisation through which British thalidomide survivors receive financial support. She is still involved in the media activities of the trust.

In 2012, Argy was interviewed by Ruth Blue for the Thalidomide: An Oral History project.

In 2014, Argy took a campaign for compensation for the victims of thalidomide to the European Union Health Commissioner. The next year, Argy stood as a candidate for the Independence from Europe party in the 2015 European Parliament election in South East England, but was not elected.

In 2016, Argy advised the producers of the BBC period drama Call The Midwife for a storyline exploring thalidomide survivors. During press for the show, Argy shared that she can no longer carry saucepans or manage zips and buttons. It is common for thalidomide survivors to experience musculoskeletal deterioration as they age.

== Honours ==
Argy was appointed as a Member of the Order of the British Empire (MBE) in the 2015 Birthday Honours. She was described as "Campaigner and Member, National Advisory Council, Thalidomide Trust", and the honour was "For services to Thalidomide Survivors". She said that she was "astonished but absolutely delighted" to be appointed MBE.

== Personal life ==
Argy has two daughters, including TikTok content creator and influencer Madeline Argy. Their father left the household when Madeline was 6 years old and divorced.
