= Ruth Davis Kohrt =

- Born: August 27, 1921
- Died: April 13, 2012 (aged 90); Des Moines, Iowa, U.S.
- Education: Iowa State Teachers College; Augustana College
- Occupations: Author; educator
- Parent(s): George Davis; Sadie Merrill

Ruth Davis Kohrt (August 27, 1921 – April 13, 2012) was a regional author from Northwest Iowa.

== Biography ==
She was born into the pioneer family of George and Sadie (Merrill) Davis of Webb, Iowa. George lost the farm in the Depression, but Ruth was able to graduate from both Iowa State Teachers College (now the University of Northern Iowa) and Augustana College. She went on to a 42-year career in Iowa and Minnesota schools, teaching in settings ranging from one-room elementary schools through town high schools. As school librarian and English teacher, she founded five school and town libraries. After she retired, she wrote novels and memoirs. Kohrt's writing is characterized by depictions of the speech, mannerisms and character of people in Northwest Iowa.

She died on April 13, 2012, in Des Moines, Iowa.

== Works ==
=== Fiction ===
- From a Test Tube with Love (1999) ISBN 0-7414-0160-6
- Stella’s Statue (2003) ISBN 1-4107-2702-5

=== Memoirs ===
- Nine Months at $90 (1997) ISBN 0-9659748-4-7
- Armon’s Apples (1998) ISBN 09659748-20
- Notes from a Depression Girl (2006) ISBN 0977022080
