= Leonardo Mario Bernacchi =

Leonardo Mario Bernacch (January 5, 1935 – April 10, 2012) was the Roman Catholic titular bishop of Tabaicara and bishop of the Roman Catholic Apostolic Vicariate of Camiri, Bolivia.

Ordained to the priesthood in 1958, Bernacchi became bishop in 1993 and retired in 2009.
