= Brian Boland (footballer) =

Australian rules footballer

Personal information
- Full name: Brian Boland
- Born: 26 July 1931
- Died: 20 April 2012 (aged 80)
- Original team: St Josephs College
- Height: 180 cm (5 ft 11 in)
- Weight: 73 kg (161 lb)
- Position: Defence

Playing career^{1}
Years	Club	Games (Goals)
1950–54	Richmond	50 (6)
1955	Hawthorn	6 (0)
Total		56 (6)
- ^{1} Playing statistics correct to the end of 1955.

Brian Boland (26 July 1931 – 20 April 2012) was a former Australian rules footballer who played for Richmond and Hawthorn in the Victorian Football League (VFL).
