= Michaelina Bellamy =

American singer (1952–2012)

Michaelina Raquel Bellamy (June 13, 1952 – April 7, 2012) was an American singer, dancer, actress and U.S. Air Force Veteran.

== Early life ==
Michaelina Raquel Bellamy was born to James and Olga Bellamy in 1952, in Los Angeles, California. She was the third oldest out of six children, and the oldest daughter. Her older brother Tony Bellamy was the lead guitarist for the Native American rock band, RedBone. Her other sibling is the Latin percussionist, Renaldo "Reno" Bellamy. She was raised in Orange County, California, where she studied opera singing and Flamenco dancing with her siblings. She graduated from Tustin High School in 1970. She was of Swedish, Spanish and Mexican descent, and spoke English, Spanish, and Portuguese fluently.

== Career ==
After a USO tour with Bob Hope in 1971, Bellamy entered the Air Force, and sang with the Airmen of Note, achieving the rank of Staff Sergeant. Having competed her military service, she moved to Nevada, and worked in various lounges and showrooms, until becoming the Lead Singer and Dancer in The Folies Bergere, at the Tropicana Hotel and Casino from 1978 to 1984. Between The Folies Bergere and a European and American tour as a backup singer for Engelbert Humperdinck in the late 80s, Bellamy performed across the country, from Las Vegas to Atlantic City in various shows, including the Jerry Lewis Telethon in 1984. Bellamy briefly returned to the Folies in 1987, before leaving in 1990 to tour again with Humperdinck. In 1994, Bellamy recorded a live concert with Humperdinck, performing the song When I Fall In Love, as a duet; as well as a solo performance of an updated version of Malaguena. In the early 2000s, she was a single-billed performer at the top of the Stratosphere, in Las Vegas, Nevada.

== Controversy ==
In January 2007, Michaelina Bellamy was assaulted by a priest, who she claimed had become obsessed with her. She was working as an Events Coordinator for Our Lady of Las Vegas Catholic Church, in Las Vegas, NV, and worked under Rev. George Chaanine. On January 26, 2007, around 5pm, George Chaanine crept up behind Bellamy, and smashed her in the head with a large wine bottle. When she was not subdued, he struggled and beat her, breaking her hand, and choking her until "she felt she was dying." She told police that she was losing consciousness and started to pray. Bellamy testified in court that the priest assaulted her sexually, but later agreed to drop those charges in order to avoid a lengthy trial. Chaanine ran from the scene and fled to California and Arizona, while a nationwide manhunt was conducted for 5 days. The case appeared on America's Most Wanted, and Chaanine was apprehended 30 miles outside of Phoenix, in Apache Junction, AZ on January 31, 2007. Chaanine was held on a $1 Million bond, pending arraignment in March 2007. Bellamy was treated at University Medical Center in Las Vegas for a large head gash, that reportedly needed 20 staples along her skull. She suffered a broken left hand and multiple bruises and contusions. Both Bellamy and her youngest daughter testified that Chaanine was obsessed with Bellamy, stating, "..the more I stayed away, the more he pushed..." Chaanine took a plea deal to agree to plead guilty to Felony Battery with a Deadly Weapon, which carried a maximum number of 15 years in prison. Chaanine went to prison from 2007 until 2013, after being released on parole.

== Personal life ==
Michaelina Bellamy married jazz conductor Johnny Veith in the mid-70s, and they had three daughters. When not on tour with larger acts, they played together in smaller lounges and supper clubs across the country, and along the California coastline. They divorced in 1997.

== Death ==
Michaelina Bellamy on April 7, 2012, after battling acute myeloid leukemia.
