= Alan Alexander (footballer) =

Scottish footballer

Personal information
- Date of birth: 1 November 1941 (age 83)
- Place of birth: Cumbernauld, Scotland
- Position(s): Goalkeeper

Senior career*
Years	Team	Apps	(Gls)
- Glenluce Athletic
1961–1962	Bradford (Park Avenue)	5	(0)
- Corby Town
- *Club domestic league appearances and goals

Alan Alexander (born 1 November 1941) is a Scottish former professional footballer who played as a goalkeeper in the Football League for Bradford (Park Avenue).
