= Erland Cullberg =

Swedish artist (1931–2012)

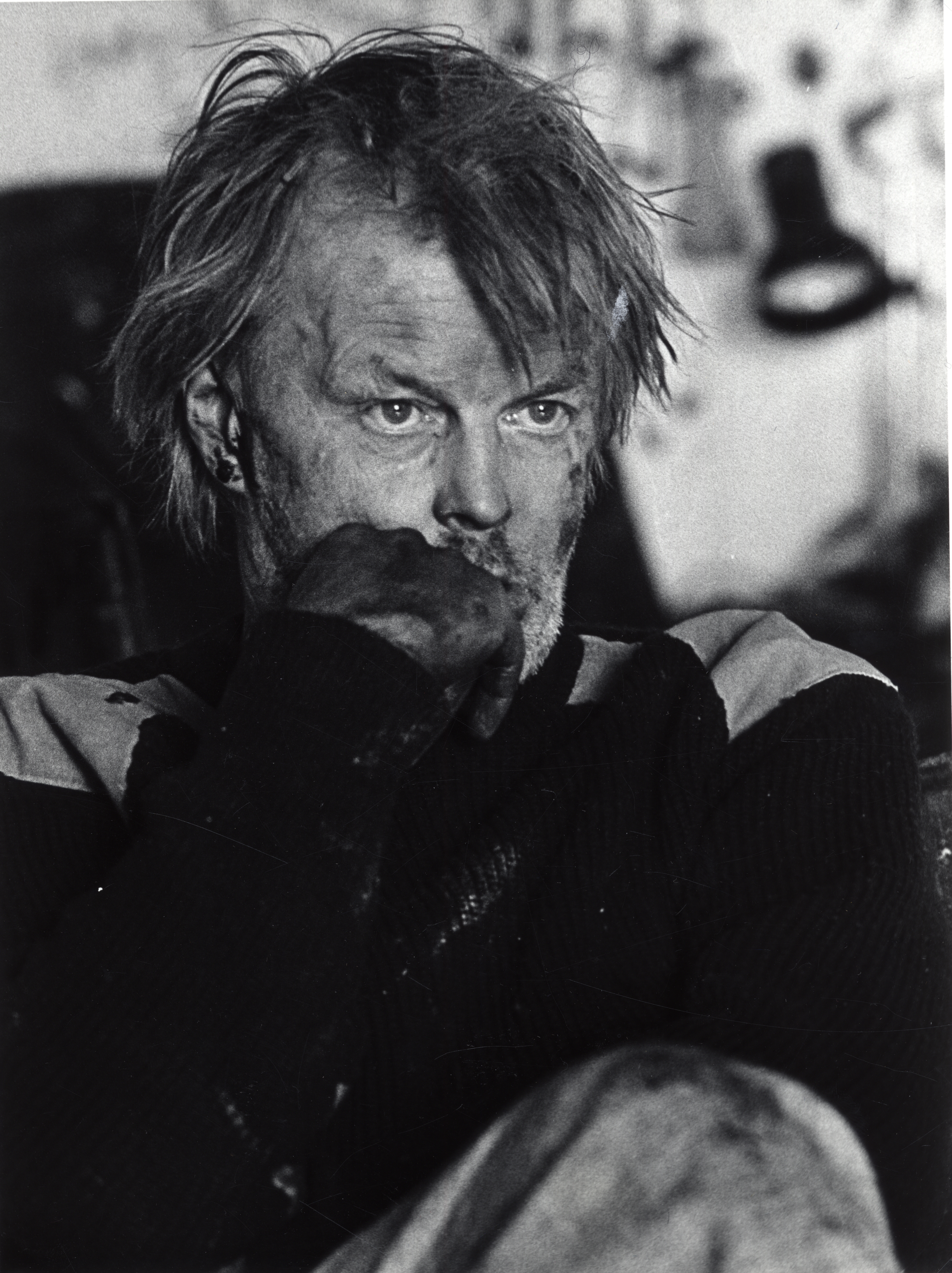
Erland Cullberg, 1986.

Johan Erland Cullberg (5 April 1931 – 13 April 2012) was a Swedish artist. He lived and worked in the city of Sollentuna, Sweden. He was the son of Eva Carin Maria Virgin (who worked in a manner similar to a Chinese "barefoot doctor") and Bishop John Cullberg, a professor and theologian. His siblings are Johan Cullberg, professor, researcher and author of psychiatry, and Staffan Cullberg, former head of the Swedish National Arts Council.

Cullberg studied from 1955 until 1957 at the Academy of Fine Arts in Stockholm and also at Valand Art Academy in Gothenburg in 1956. During this period, he was diagnosed with schizophrenia. Cullberg termed his condition as "a widespread mental cold". Cullberg also studied under and maintained a friendship with the artist Evert Lundquist who is considered to be a central figure in Swedish art.

Cullberg has continually been represented in various national and international auctions during his lifetime, and since his death, however, his works have recently garnered renewed interest culminating in the highest auction records to date. In 2021, Cullberg's "Red Figures", a large scale and richly colored work, reached a world record for the artist. Similar records have been achieved since 2020.

== Inspiration, style and method of artistic work ==
Cullberg found inspiration in the works of El Greco, Carl Fredrik Hill, and Ernst Josephson but was particularly inspired by Edvard Munch. Artist and art critic Leif Mattsson has written, much like Munch, Cullberg repeated his forms so that they became forms the viewer "had experienced". Cullberg had stated that he used color like Munch and that he was an "apostate" of Picasso.

Cullberg's style was generally considered to be that of expressionism or even termed "colorful expressionism". His method, or style of painting, was unusual. When, or if, the motif of the painting had become too realistic, Cullberg would begin a process of painting over them. His style/method of painting motif over motif and his dense and copious use of color over color earned him the moniker of "the over-painter". While the moniker "over-painter" was a somewhat humorous one, it was not derogatory; Cullberg was also termed "Sweden's Rembrandt". Cullberg explained his rationale for "over-painting"; it was a process by which he could artistically deal with a color that was too cynical or realistic. When he over-painted these colors and transformed them, he was happy. Cullberg stated that the process of modulating the colors through over-painting, and thereby achieving his desired result, gave him a "tremendous satisfaction." He would often paint several canvases at one time. He would move back and forth between the canvases, painting his motifs one on top of the other. The only problem Cullberg found with this method was in obtaining the necessary amounts of raw materials to create a large number of works. These canvases were sent to his art dealers who would then sort through the paintings in an effort to determine which were of exceptional quality. The paintings that were not accepted were then sent back to Cullberg. He would continue the process by painting over these returned works. The "over-painting" was deliberate, Cullberg knew when a painting was finished and when he had achieved his goal, his over-painting was one part of his artistic process. This technique enabled him to create many conversations, often somewhat hidden and obscured, within his finished works. Art critic Anders Olsson suggested that Cullburg's over-painting was something of a controlled destructive process which ultimately allowed, "a new vision upon the by now soiled vision." Cullberg had become his artwork's creator, destroyer and then its re-creator.

Cullberg's work can also be seen as a precursor to the works of Jean-Michel Basquiat in their use of complex iconography, though Cullberg's use may have relied on inherent concepts rather than the historical reference points used by Basquiat.

== Cullberg's "The Scream" ==
Cullberg's "The Scream" demonstrates his inspiration from, and his admiration of, Edvard Munch's artistry. Cullberg's painting is based upon Munch's iconic painting of the same name. Munch himself, and many in his family, had experienced mental conditions and situational instabilities inclusive of what appeared to be symptoms of schizophrenia. "The Scream" is generally interpreted as a visual metaphor used by Munch to express his own mental instability, personal failures, and anxieties. The exact nature of the work and subsequently its interpretations continue to make for a lively discourse. Shortly after painting "The Scream", Munch entered a mental health facility as he had been hearing "voices". Perhaps beyond an artistic kinship, given his own mental health issues, Cullberg may have felt a level of identification with the intent and circumstances which led Munch to produce "The Scream". In Cullberg's version, the central motif is recreated within his own style, becoming a work of Cullberg, as opposed to Cullberg reproducing only a copy of Munch's work.

== "Ängladyk" ==
Cullberg seemed to believe, or at least to suggest a belief, in external metaphysical forces which, at times, assisted him in the creation of his works. This belief has been suggested, or alluded to, by many artists. Wassily Kandinsky's works often dealt with metaphysical representations. The Northern European "Romanticists" produced "intensity meditative images" which sought to channel their own inner spiritual truth(s). Perhaps, the concept was taken the furthest by Hilma af Klint. Klint produced the first truly abstract artworks known; she developed her artwork in what she believed was direct communication with the metaphysical world through seance and automatic writing. Art critic Susanna Slöör shares one story about Cullberg and the metaphysical world. Cullberg had received a visit from a fellow artist who commented on the success of a particular painting. Cullberg is said to have stated, emphatically, that the work was an "Ängladyk". "Ängla, dyk", translated to English, means "angel dive" (the work was driven by angels/metaphysical forces). Slöör, in writing about the possible connotation of this suggestion by Cullberg, compared it to a belief held by monks who painted religious pictures with the faith, or hope, that the divine would lead them to successfully produce their religious artworks. The monks had thus become a channel for use by the divine. In applying the concept to modern day artists who might attribute their work to such a metaphysical interaction, Slöör suggests such a moment usually occurs when the artist completes a successful work but is not able to explain precisely to themselves or others how they achieved it. In 1977, Cullberg perhaps returned to, or confirmed this belief when he produced a work titled "Ängladyk". "Ängladyk" was included in his exhibition at Konstakademien, Salarna, Stockholm. Other works in the exhibition included "Shelly's Death" (1979), "Unknown Poet" (1982) and "The Wizard's Pupil" (2007).

== Emergence of mental difficulties ==
In 2018, Cullberg's sibling Dr. Johan Cullberg recalled the night in 1956 when Erland Cullberg was discovered outside his home in Stockholm. Erland, barely able to speak, had claimed he had spoken to both Picasso and Mozart. Johan began the process to commit Erland for psychiatric care. Erland was placed in Beckomberga, a mental facility in Bromma. When Johan next visited Erland, he was horrified to find him tied to a bed and in an unsanitary state. This would cause Johan to have a deep dislike of Beckomberga and may have contributed to his lifelong passion for developing supportive and reasonable care for those facing mental issues. Erland would receive in excess of one hundred Electroconvulsive therapy sessions along with high doses of medication. Despite the treatment, Erland remained depressed. In 1961, Johan would become a psychiatrist and eventually would take over Erland's treatment and successfully lower his medication levels. Throughout the ordeal, Erland continued to paint.

== Artwork in context of Cullberg's mental illness and life(style) ==
Many have considered the impact that schizophrenia may have had on his art. Art critic Leif Mattsson premised that, for Cullberg, it was both "his muse and his cross"; his perception of the "supersensible and labile" created "redemption" but it also imprisoned him. Art critic and commentator Olle Granath wrote that some had "romanticized" Cullberg as a reclusive artist with a mental disease. Granath felt that Cullberg's artworks stood on their own merits and should not be overly contextualized within a framework of his life and his illness.

== Cullberg interview highlights ==
In 1980, Anders Widoff spoke with Cullberg in his studio. The artist spoke about his personal life and his artwork. Cullberg recalled his father and what he seemed to feel were his own failings in regards to his father's teaching. Cullberg's father was a Bishop of the Diocese of Västerås. Cullberg felt he was born in the same light as Jesus but had now become inferior to him saying, "if you step off that light, then it's down to hell direct". Cullberg went on to suggest that such a theme might be a good one for a painting. He imagined the motif as a "machine that gobbles up people." Cullberg claimed that he did not distinguish between good and evil himself.

Cullberg made a distinction between his drawing and sketching and that of his painting. Although much of his drawing or sketching was related to his painting style, he nonetheless found that when drawing he would, or could, face a "crisis situation". However, in painting, Cullberg added humorously that he would become a "real bastard with the colors". He described his painting multiple canvases simultaneously as "feast days".

Cullberg believed that when others saw both him and his works, they would recognize that he was trying to create, "some sort of flint-hard spiritual being...which can burst and become a song."

For all of his success and his recognition, Cullberg simply "wished" to go to Hawaii. For him, going to Hawaii meant new clothes and music. In Hawaii, there is "song in the air."

== Public recognition ==
Cullberg had exhibited his work since 1961. After his debut, he continued to exhibit, almost yearly, at institutions and private galleries. A total of forty-seven solo exhibitions were held between the years of 1961 and 1985. He was well known by fellow artists. He and his work had developed a kind of "mythological" status, particularly in his use of color, among his peers. His breakthrough with the general public occurred during the 1980s. He participated in a traveling exhibition that was shown in Sweden at numerous art institutes and was well received by the public. The exhibition then traveled to Centre Culturel Suédois in Paris. His breakthrough was further secured in 1986 when the Moderna Museet held a widely recognized/publicized exhibition of his works. The Moderna Museet also named Cullberg "Artist of the Year". In 2008, one of Cullberg's last full-scale public exhibitions took place at the Academy of Fine Arts in Stockholm.

In the 1980s, artist Anders Widoff filmed a documentary on Cullberg. The documentary, "Övermålaren (The Painter)" was filmed at the artist's studio. The film addressed Cullberg's near obsession with painting, his work, his method of painting and his schizophrenia.

On October 14, 2016, The Erland Cullberg Park was dedicated. The park has been described as a small oasis in Tureberg (a municipality in Sollentuna). Both siblings of Cullberg were in attendance as well as political party members of all "blocs". Also in attendance was Göran Lager, the man who initially rented Cullberg his studio in Sollentuna where Cullberg would reside until his death.

In May, 2019, siblings Staffan and Johan established the Erland Cullberg scholarship for young artists.

== Museum representation ==
Nationalmuseum, Stocholm, Sweden; Moderna Museum, Stockholm, Sweden; Göteborgs konstmuseum, Göteborgs, Sweden; Borås konstmuseum, Borås, Sweden; Östergötland Länsmuseum, Linköping, Sweden; Norrköpings Museum, Norrköping, Sweden; Västerås konstmuseum, Västerås, Sweden; Åbo konstmuseum, Turku, Finland; Statens Museum, Copenhagen, Denmark; Museum für Kunst und Kulturgeschichte der hansestadt Lübeck, Lübeck, Germany.
