= Lombard station =

Commuter rail station in Lombard, Illinois

Lombard

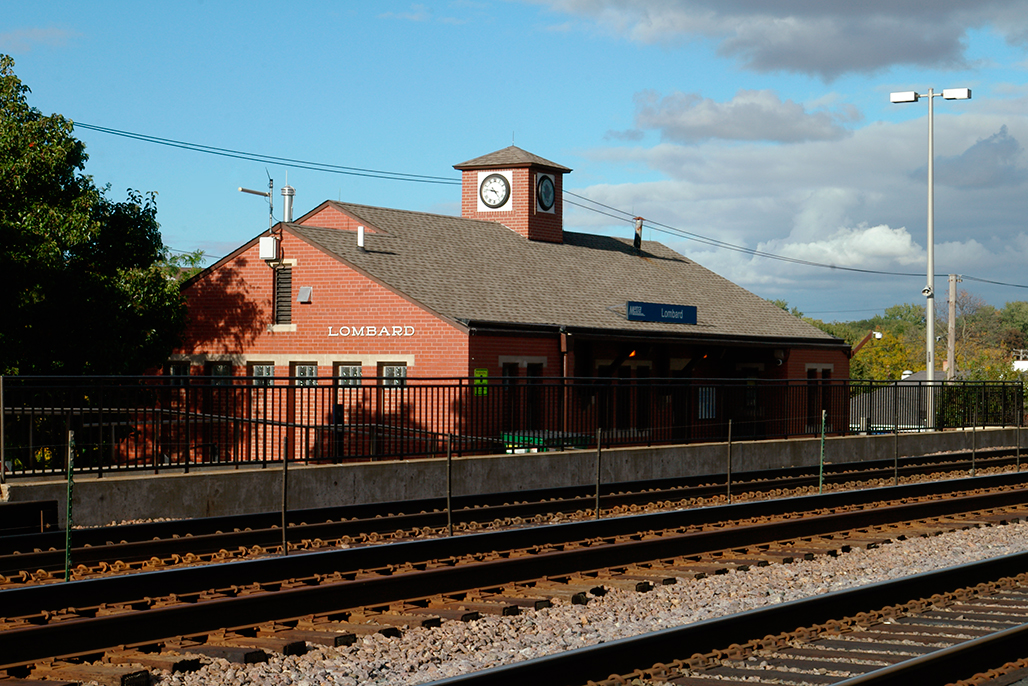
- Lombard station in September 2010

General information
- Location: 9 South Main Street, Lombard, Illinois 60148
- Coordinates: 41.8866°N 88.0187°W
- Owner: Village of Lombard
- Platforms: 2 side platforms
- Tracks: 3

Construction
- Parking: Eight city-operated lots
- Cycle facilities: Yes
- Accessible: Yes

Other information
- Fare zone: 3

History
- Opened: 1979; 47 years ago
- Rebuilt: 2015; 11 years ago

Passengers
- 2018: 1,502 (average weekday) ▲11.8%
- Rank: 21 out of 236

Services
Preceding station	Metra	Following station
Glen Ellyn toward Elburn	Union Pacific West	Villa Park toward Ogilvie TC
Former services
Preceding station	Chicago and North Western Railway	Following station
Wheaton toward Omaha	Main Line	Maywood toward Chicago
Glen Ellyn toward Geneva	Galena Division	Villa Park toward Chicago
Track layout
Location

Lombard is a station on Metra's Union Pacific West Line, located in Lombard, Illinois. The station is located at 9 South Main Street. Lombard is located 19.9 miles (32.0 km) away from Ogilvie Transportation Center in Chicago, the eastern terminus of the West Line. In Metra's zone-based fare system, Lombard is in zone 3. As of 2018, Lombard is the 21st busiest of the 236 non-downtown stations in the Metra system, with an average of 1,502 weekday boardings. Unless otherwise announced, inbound trains use the north platform and outbound trains use the south platform. The middle track does not have platform access.

As of September 8, 2025, Lombard is served by 54 trains (27 in each direction) on weekdays, by all 20 trains (10 in each direction) on Saturdays, and by all 18 trains (nine in each direction) on Sundays and holidays.

Lombard station is located above ground level and consists of two side platforms. Three tracks run between the platforms, though one does not access the station. There is a station house next to the inbound (north) track, which is open from 5:00 A.M. to 1:00 P.M. Tickets are available at the station house on weekdays. Eight commuter parking lots operated by the City of Lombard are near the station; three of the lots require quarterly permits, and the other five require a daily fee of $1.25.

On June 3, 2015, a pedestrian tunnel connecting the two platforms went into service after the morning rush. This tunnel replaced the existing track-level crossing between platforms for increased pedestrian and commuter safety.

The station is in the heart of the village's central business district. Lilacia Park, the Helen Plum Library, and various local establishments are within walking distance from the station.
