= Helen M. Plum Memorial Library =

Public library located in Lombard, Illinois, US

Helen Plum Library
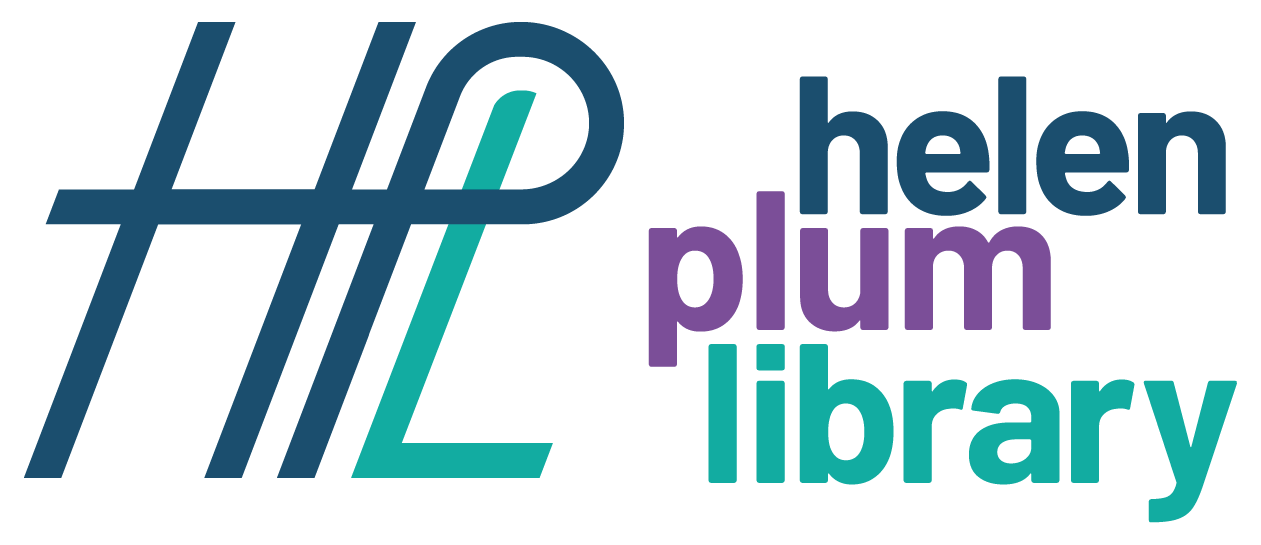

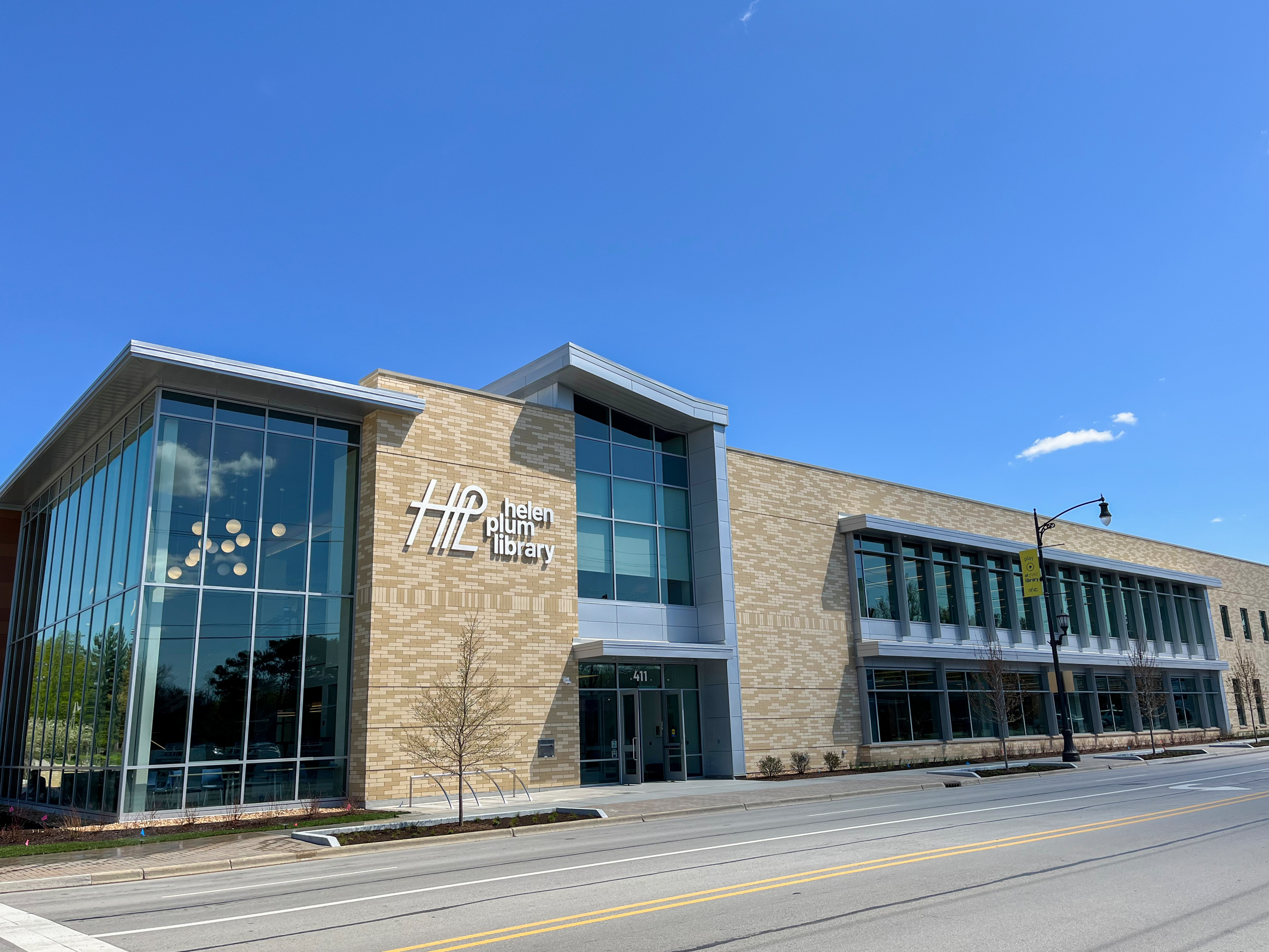
- Helen Plum Library facade as of May 2023
- 41°52′47.1318″N 88°1′3.64″W
- Location: 411 South Main Street; Lombard, Illinois, United States
- Type: public
- Established: 1927; 99 years ago

Collection
- Size: 223,339

Other information
- Director: Anne Luzeniecki
- Public transit access: UP-W
- Website: helenplum.org

The Helen M. Plum Memorial Library is a public library in Lombard, Illinois.

== History ==
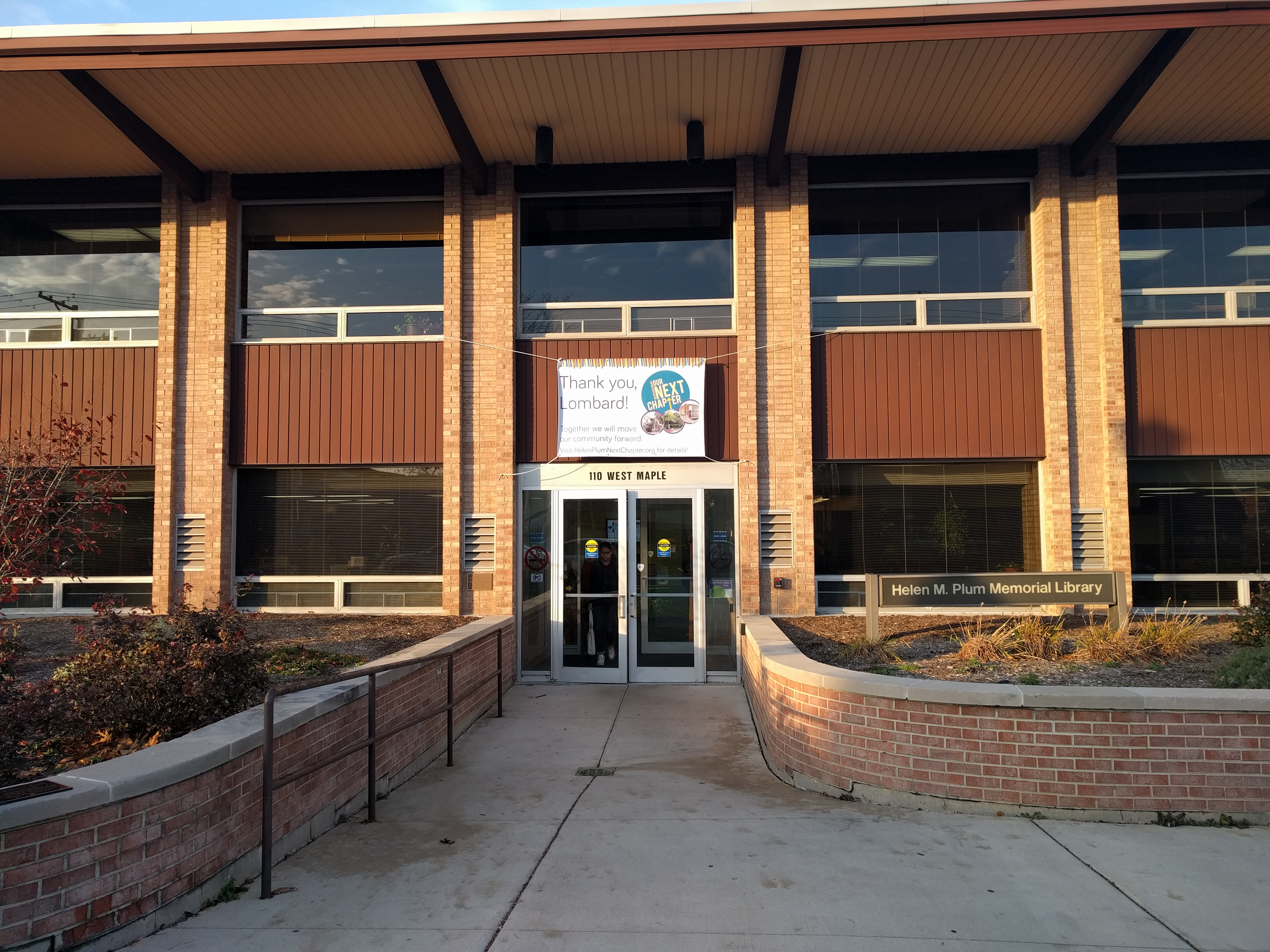
Entrance to the library's former location on Maple Street in Lombard

Josiah Reade established the first public library in Lombard at the First Church of Lombard in 1905.

The Helen Plum Library and Lilacia Park were founded in 1927, according to the will of the late Colonel William R. Plum. Josiah Reade's collection was moved to the new library. The library was originally located in Plum's house, but moved to its location at 110 W. Maple Street in 1963.

In 2003, the library received a $360,000 donation for books, equipment, and the establishment of a scholarship fund.

In 2013, the library was given the Muslim Journeys Bookshelf by the National Endowment for the Humanities and the American Library Association. This project aims to educate the public about the culture and history of Muslims in the United States.

Barbara Kruser, the former director of the library, aimed to increase programming and raise funding for a new building for the library. In late 2015, the Board of Trustees began meeting to decide whether to expand or replace the current building. In March 2016, the library decided to keep the library at the current location. In November 2016, voters approved a referendum for the library to borrow $22.3 million to replace the library's current building.

In 2020, the library announced its intent to develop a former grocery store property in Lombard. On March 9, 2021, the library closed on the properties located at 411 and 425 South Main Street, which formerly housed Mr. Z's grocery store and the Art Life Gallery and Studio. The village hosted the groundbreaking at the site of the new library on June 15, 2021. The existing library permanently closed on March 8, 2023, in preparation for an April 2023 grand opening at the new site. The new library was opened to the public on April 22, 2023.
