= Sacred Heart School (Lombard, Illinois) =

Roman Catholic school in Lombard, Illinois, US

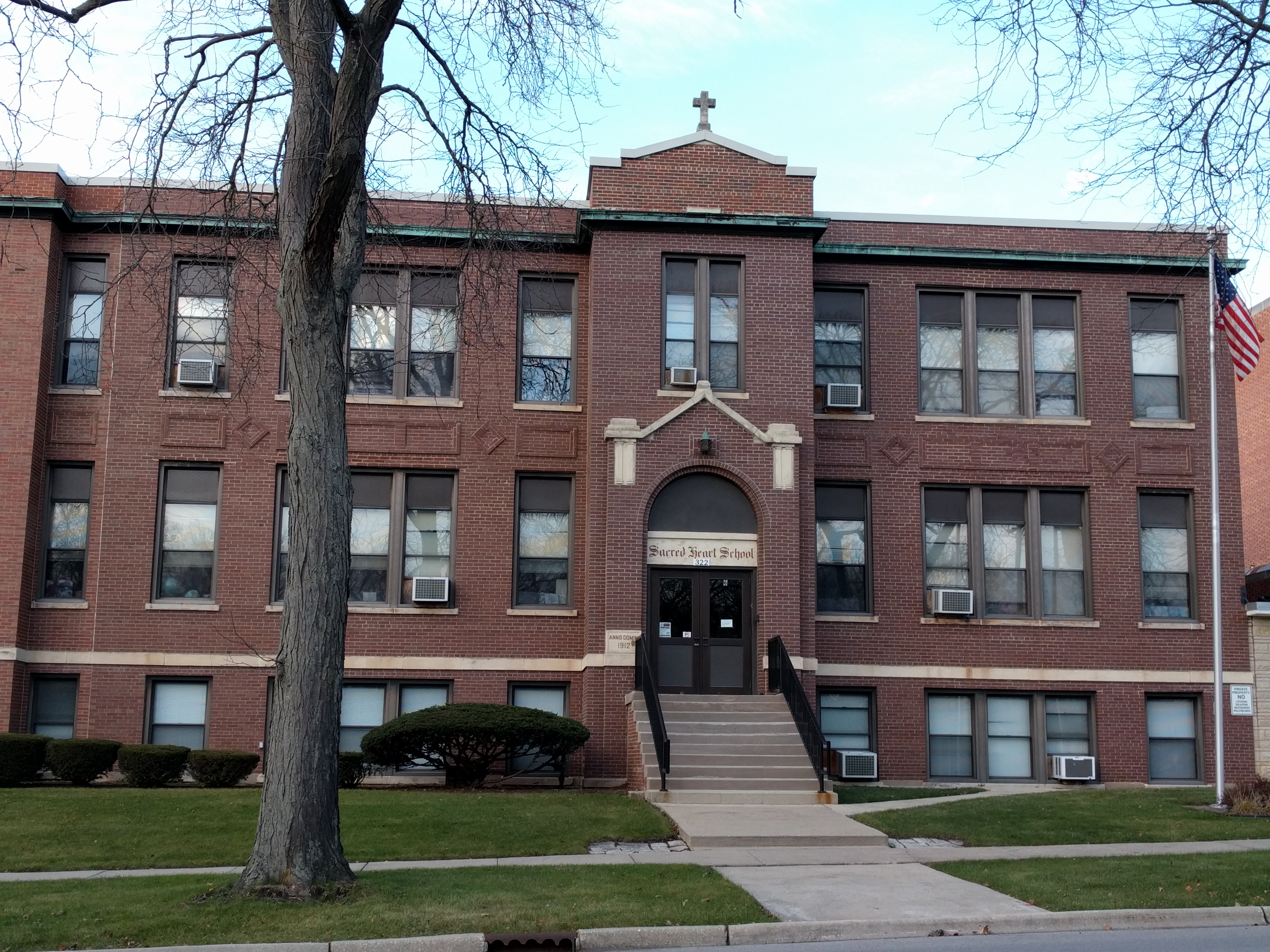
- Sacred Heart School in Lombard, Illinois

Location
- 322 West Maple Street; Lombard, DuPage, Illinois 60148; United States
- 41°53′02″N 88°01′28″W

Information
- Type: Private elementary, coeducational
- Religious affiliation: Roman Catholic
- Established: 1912
- Closed: 2023
- Educational authority: NCEA
- Oversight: Diocese of Joliet
- NCES School ID: 00346683
- Principal: Gina Pestrak
- Grades: PreK–8
- Enrollment: 199 (2019–2020)
- Affiliation: Sacred Heart Parish
- Website: shslombard.org (archived)

Sacred Heart School was a Catholic elementary school located in Lombard, Illinois. The school was part of the Roman Catholic Diocese of Joliet in Illinois.

== History ==
Sacred Heart School was established in 1912, with the first class of 30 students being taught in a barn owned by local resident Martin Hogan. In 1913, the school's first elementary school building was built. The school was originally run by the School Sisters of St. Francis, and had a total enrollment of 66 in 1921. The school was expanded several times over the years.

The school held many activities for students, including an annual runathon and spelling bee.

Sacred Heart School closed at the end of the 2022–2023 school year due to static or declining enrollment and was merged with St. Pius X Catholic School.

== See also ==
- Sacred Heart Church (Lombard, Illinois)
