= Glen Ellyn station =

Commuter rail station in Glen Ellyn, Illinois

Glen Ellyn

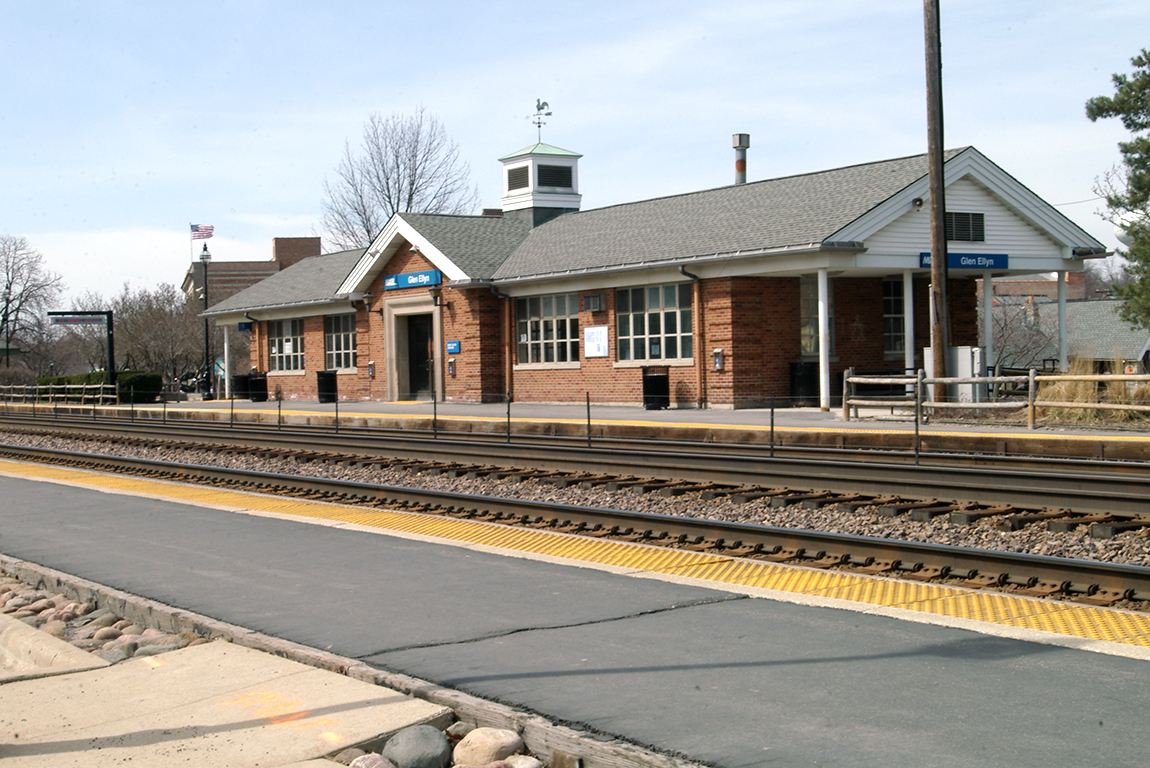
- Glen Ellyn station in March 2010

General information
- Location: 551 Crescent Boulevard, Glen Ellyn, Illinois 60137
- Coordinates: 41.8766°N 88.0646°W
- Owner: Village of Glen Ellyn
- Platforms: 2 side platforms
- Tracks: 3

Construction
- Accessible: Yes

Other information
- Fare zone: 4

History
- Opened: 1936; 90 years ago

Passengers
- 2018: 1,929 (average weekday) ▲11.2%
- Rank: 9 out of 236

Services
Preceding station	Metra	Following station
College Avenue toward Elburn	Union Pacific West	Lombard toward Ogilvie TC
Former services
Preceding station	Chicago and North Western Railway	Following station
College Avenue toward Geneva	Galena Division	Lombard toward Chicago
Preceding station	Chicago Aurora and Elgin Railroad	Following station
Services at adjacent Glen Ellyn station
College Avenue toward Wheaton	Main Line	Taylor Avenue toward Chicago
Track layout
Location

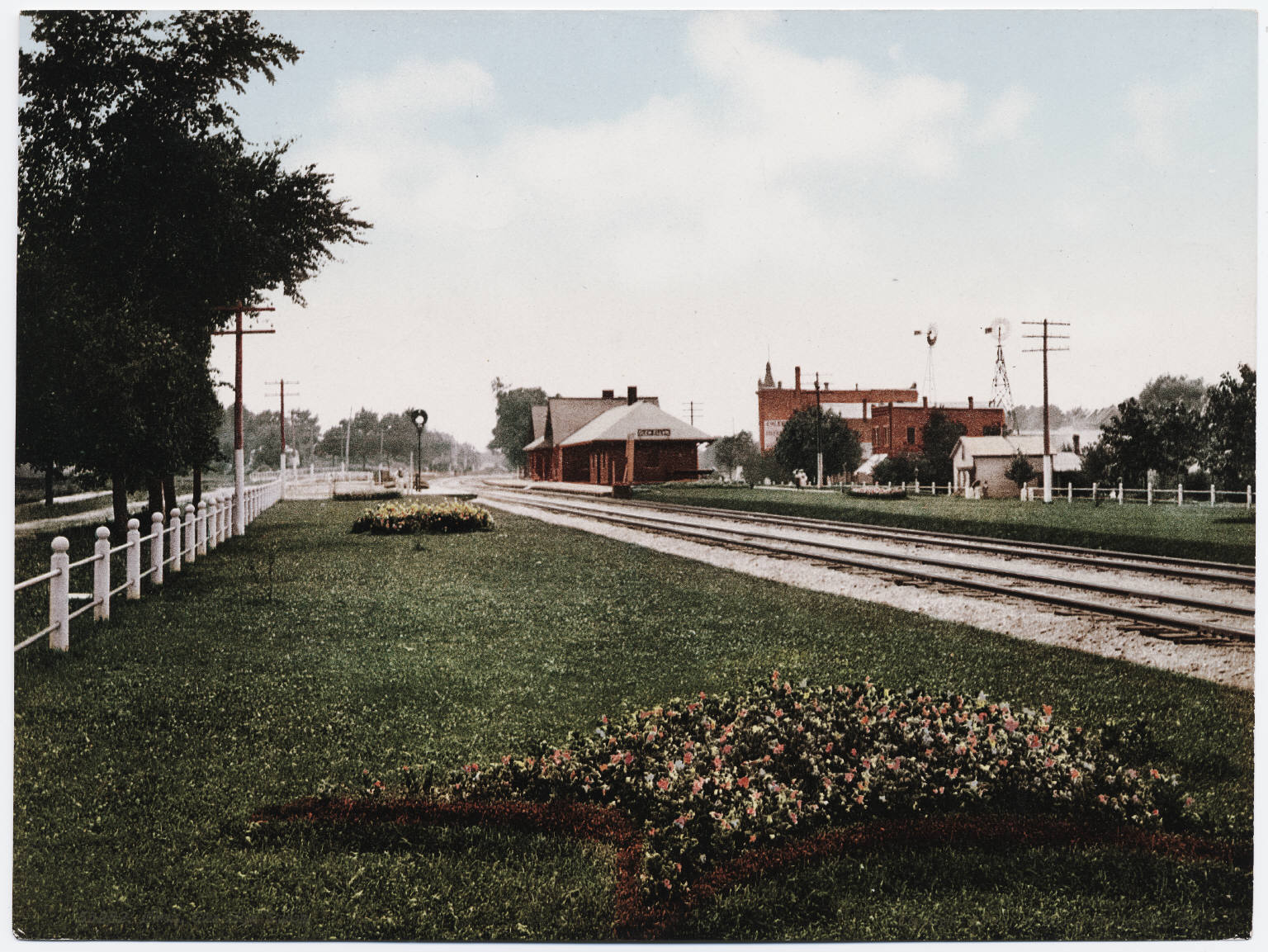
1898 postcard of Glen Ellyn Chicago & North Western station

Glen Ellyn is a station on Metra's Union Pacific West Line, located in Glen Ellyn, Illinois. The station is located at 551 Crescent Boulevard in Glen Ellyn. The station is located 22.4 miles (36.0 km) away from Ogilvie Transportation Center, the eastern terminus of the West Line. In Metra's zone-based fare system, Glen Ellyn is in zone 4. As of 2018, Glen Ellyn is the ninth busiest of the 236 non-downtown stations in the Metra system, with an average of 1,929 weekday boardings. Unless otherwise announced, inbound trains use the north platform and outbound trains use the south platform. The middle track does not have platform access.

As of September 8, 2025, Glen Ellyn is served by all 58 trains (29 in each direction) on weekdays, by all 20 trains (10 in each direction) on Saturdays, and by all 18 trains (nine in each direction) on Sundays and holidays.

Glen Ellyn station is located at ground level and consists of two side platforms. Three tracks run between the platforms, though one does not access the station. There is a station house next to the inbound (north) track, which is open from 5:00 A.M. to 1:00 P.M. Tickets are available at the station house on weekdays. The Illinois Prairie Path runs along the south edge of the complex, running in the former Chicago Aurora and Elgin Railroad right-of-way.

The station is planned to be reconstructed by 2027, which is to include a new pedestrian tunnel under the tracks to allow riders to access both platforms in the event that grade crossings are blocked by trains.

== Connections ==
- Pace Route 715
