= Sacred Heart Church (Lombard, Illinois) =

Roman Catholic church in Lombard, Illinois, USA

- Sacred Heart Church
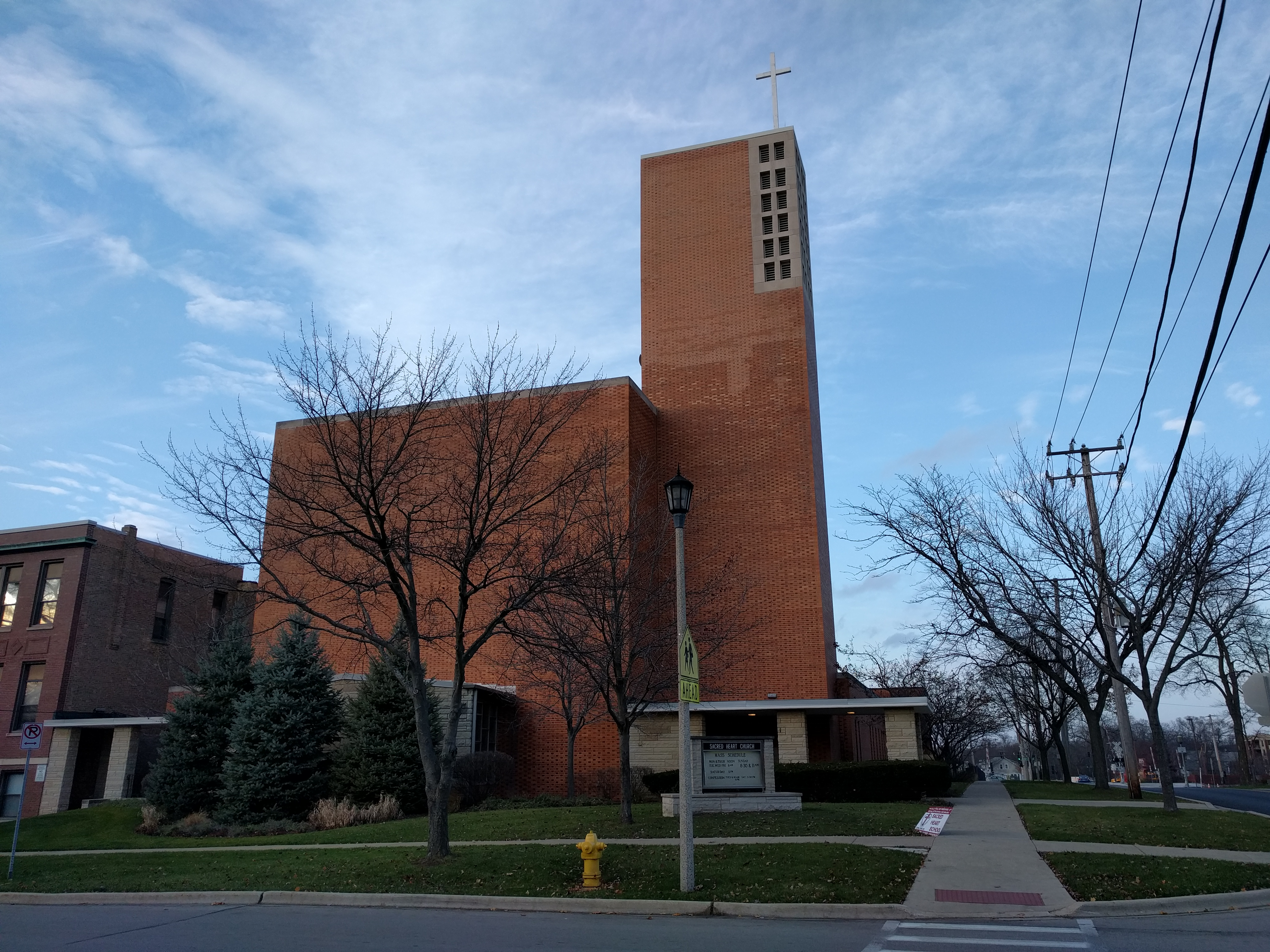
- Sacred Heart Church
- 41°53′03″N 88°01′27″W
- Location: Lombard, Illinois
- Country: United States
- Denomination: Catholic
- Website: www.sacredheartlombard.org

History
- Founded: 1912; 114 years ago

Clergy
- Pastor: Rev. Thomas Dunn

Sacred Heart Church is a Roman Catholic church located in Lombard, Illinois. It is part of the Roman Catholic Diocese of Joliet in Illinois.

== History ==
The church was founded by 54 families in 1912, with the first services held at the Lincoln School house. The first pastor was Father Boecker. In 1958, the church was rebuilt, and was dedicated in 1959 as a permanent church. In January 2002, a new Parish Center was dedicated on the location where the parish's convent had been located from 1925 until its demolition in the summer of 1999.

Until 2019, the parish hosted an annual Germanfest, which started in 1968 as a small picnic event. Each year, 30 to 40 thousand people attended the festival, and it was the longest-running outdoor festival in the western suburbs of Chicago. In 2016 and 2017, the band 7th Heaven performed at the festival. The festival has since been replaced by a one-day parish picnic in observance of the Feast of the Sacred Heart in June.

In 2012, the church held the funeral for inventor Eugene Polley.

== See also ==
- Sacred Heart School (Lombard, Illinois)
