= Lilacia Park =

Park in Lombard, Illinois, US

Coordinates: 41.8852°N 88.0205°W

- Interactive map of Lilacia Park
- Location: 150 South Park Avenue, Lombard, Illinois
- Area: 8.5-acre (3.4 ha)
- Created: 1927; 99 years ago
- Founder: Colonel William Plum
- Operator: Lombard Park District
- Open: Daily
- Parking: Yes
- Public transit: UP-W
- Website: lombardparks.com/lilacia-park/
- Lilacia Park Historic District
- U.S. National Register of Historic Places
- U.S. Historic district
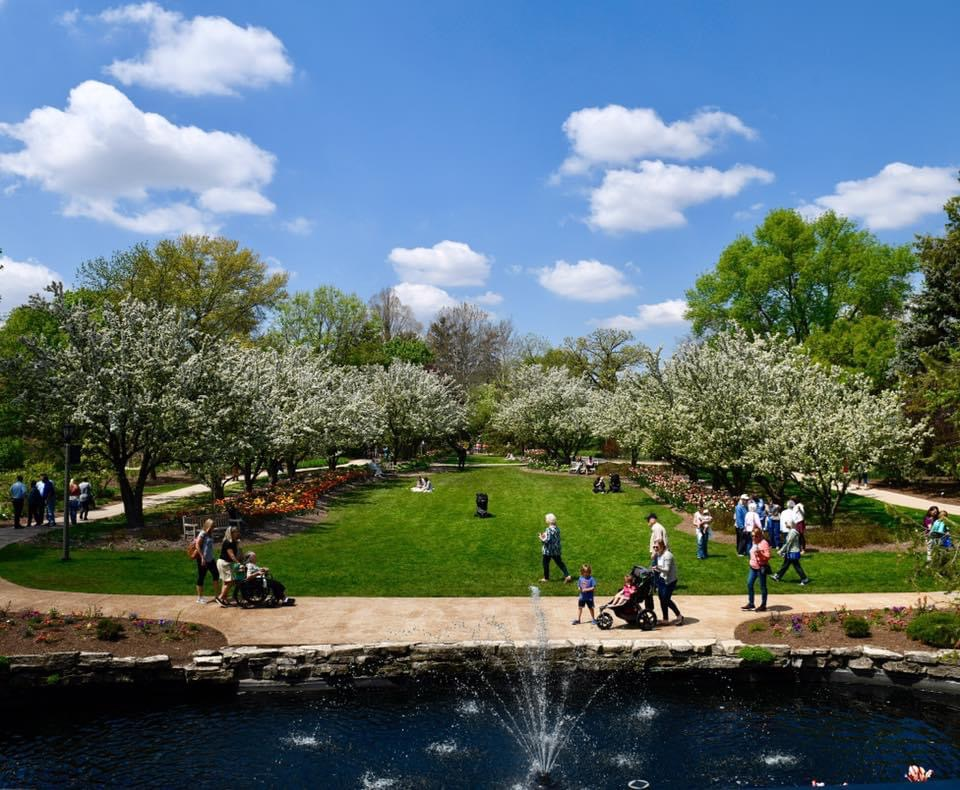
- Location: 150 S. Park Ave.
- NRHP reference No.: 20190509
- Added to NRHP: May 9, 2019

Lilacia Park, an 8.5-acre (3.4 ha) garden, is located at 150 South Park Avenue, Lombard, Illinois and is adjacent to the Lombard station. The park specializes in lilacs and tulips. The park is open to the public daily.

The garden was established by Colonel William Plum and his wife, Helen, who visited the lilac gardens of famous breeder Victor Lemoine (1823–1911), in Nancy, France. They returned with two cuttings (Mme. Casimir Perier, a double white, and Michel Buchner, a double light purple), which formed the basis of today's collection. After the Colonel's death in 1927 the grounds were left to the city as a public park.

The park now features more than 200 varieties of lilacs and 50 varieties of tulips, as well as a greenhouse, historical building, picnic areas, and drinking fountains.

Each year in May when Lilacs and other flowers are in full bloom, there is a "Lilac Time". This celebration includes visiting Lilacia Park to view all the blooming plants, the Lilac Parade down the Lombard Main Street, and the Lilac Princess Program contest.

The park was listed on the National Register of Historic Places in 2019.

== Gallery ==
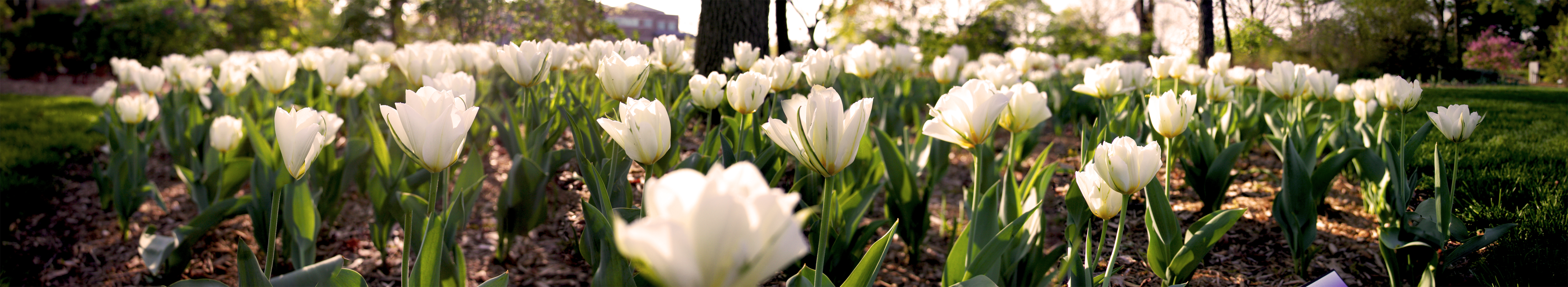
White tulips in Lilacia Park, taken at the beginning of April. The lilacs are just starting to bloom.

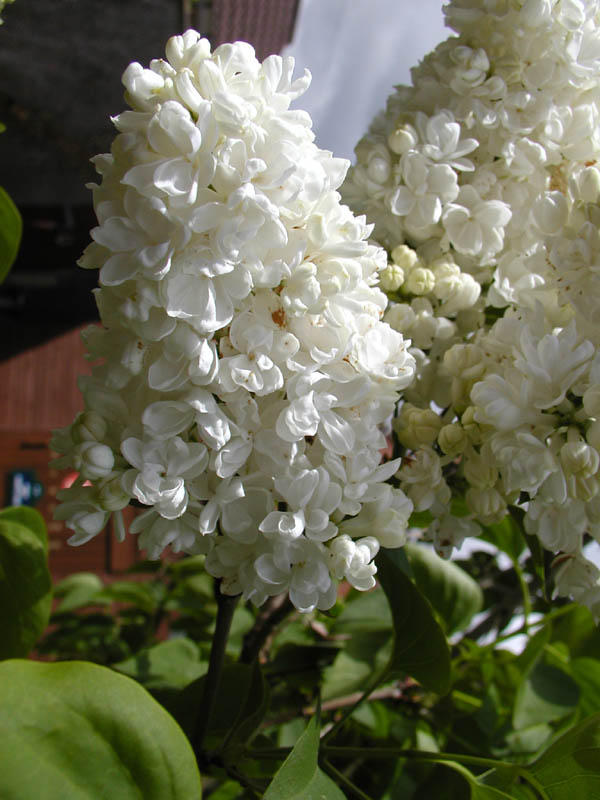
Detail of white lilac (Syringa vulgaris) head

== See also ==
- List of botanical gardens in the United States
- National Register of Historic Places listings in DuPage County, Illinois
