= Maple Street Chapel =

Historic building in Illinois, U.S.

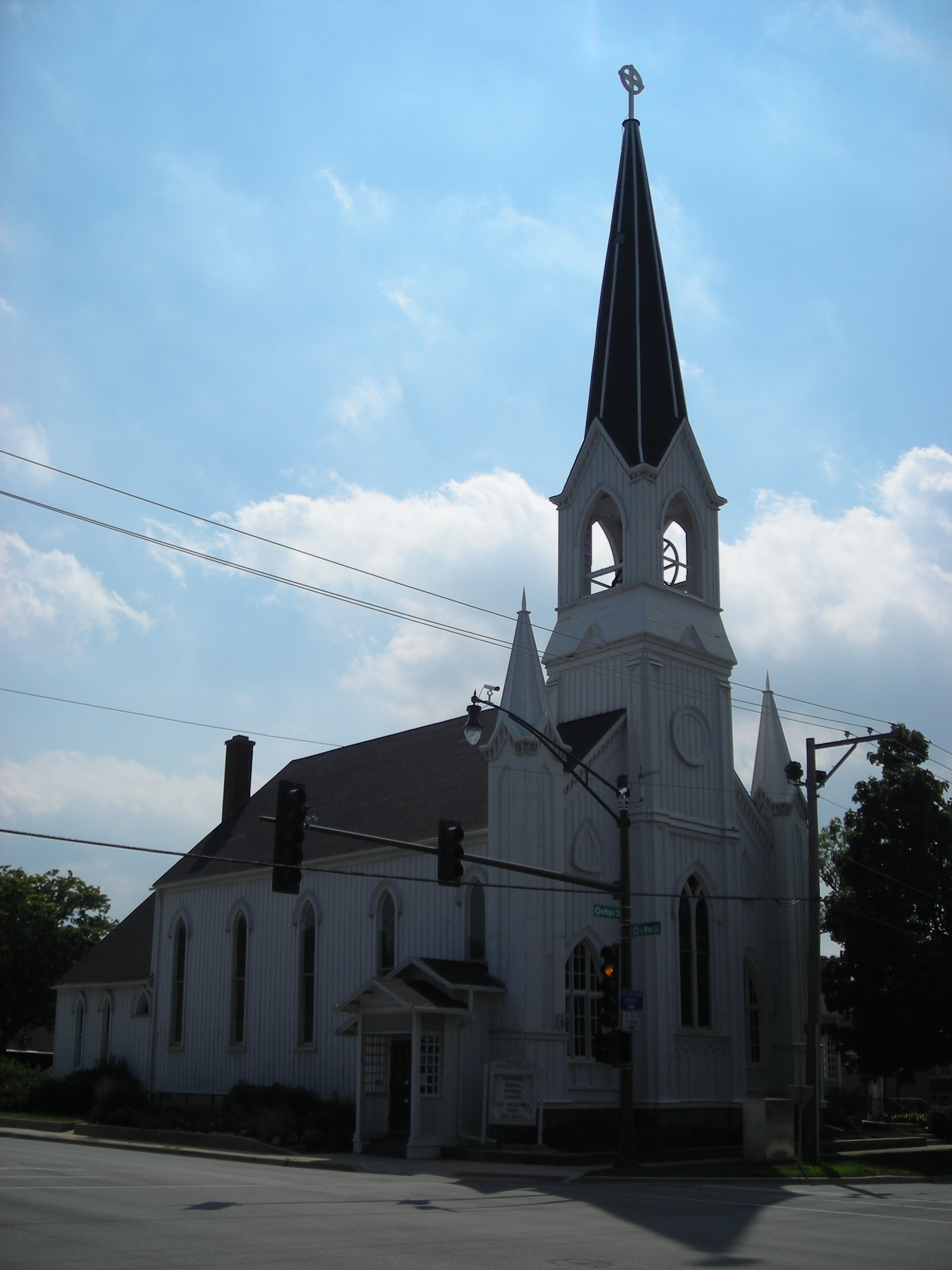

Religion
- Affiliation: United Church of Christ, formerly Congregational
- Leadership: Rev. Jeffrey Phillips

Location
- Location: Maple and Main Streets; Lombard, DuPage County, Illinois, U.S.
- Interactive map of Maple Street Chapel
- Coordinates: 41.883056°N 88.018611°W

Architecture
- Style: Gothic Revival
- Completed: 1870; 156 years ago

U.S. National Register of Historic Places
- Added to NRHP: August 10, 1978
- NRHP Reference no.: 78001144

The Maple Street Chapel is a historical Gothic Revival building in Lombard, Illinois, U.S. It is owned by "The First Church of Lombard".

== History ==
The congregation previously met in a building built in 1851 as "The Congregational Church of Babcock's Grove". The 170-seat structure known as the Maple Street Chapel and was dedicated on May 29, 1870. For the first fifty years, the south room functioned as a free public library of books from Josiah Torrey Reade, a former student of Amherst College. This was the village's very first library. The first Lombard kindergarten class was held in the church. The chapel's bell not only called the parishioners to service on Sundays, it also summoned the village's volunteer fire department if there was a fire in town. Pews were rented to wealthy residents, with seats nearest the heater the most in demand. After the turn of the century, the Chapel even presented silent movies. The Maple Street Chapel was added to the National Register of Historic Places in 1978.

The Chapel is no longer used for ordinary church services, rather it is used for weddings, concerts, programs, etc. However, the congregation of the First Church of Lombard continues to be a part of the Lombard community but worship services are now held in an adjacent, 400-seat building. The First Church of Lombard is affiliated with the United Church of Christ. Their pastor since 2020 is the Rev. Dr. Jill Terpstra. While The First Church of Lombard still owns the building, its maintenance and preservation is entrusted to the Maple Street Chapel Preservation Society, Inc.

== Architecture ==
The Maple Street Chapel is a rectangular gable roof Gothic Revival church building. Its main facade faces the north. There are porches that provide entrance to the church on the northeast, the northwest and the southwest. The church has eleven large, decorative Grisaille windows, five on the east and west sides and one on the north. There are six smaller, clear glass windows on the south and two on the north. The open belfry and spire forms a large tower at the north end of the building. There are smaller spires to the east and west of the tower on the north facade. The original north entrance of the building was removed in 1915 when Maple Street was paved; the replacement entrances were built in its place. Inside, the pews, wainscoting, and pine flooring are original.

== News and events ==
- August 2015: A small fire was started.

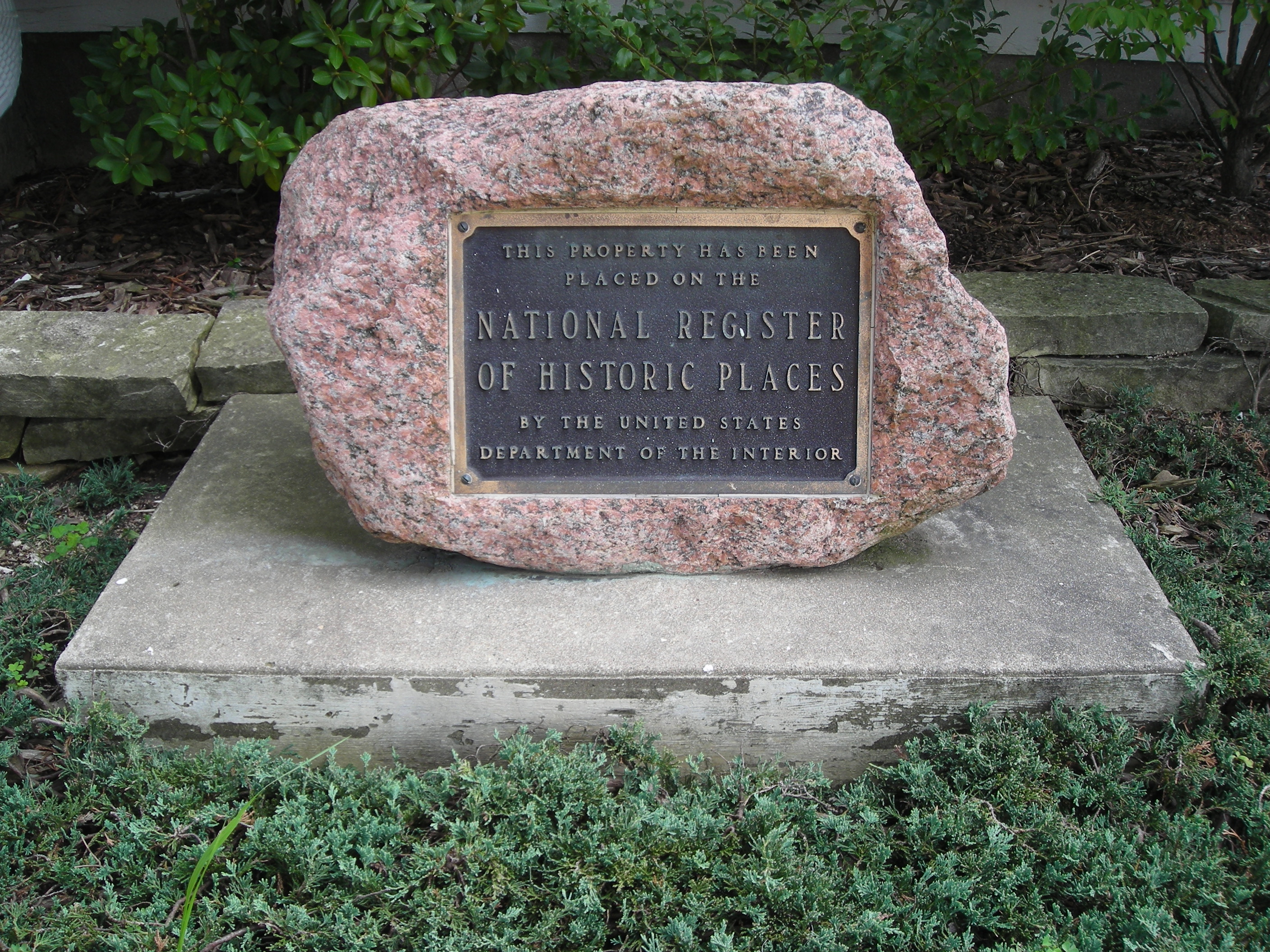
