= Lombard, Illinois =

Lombard
- Village
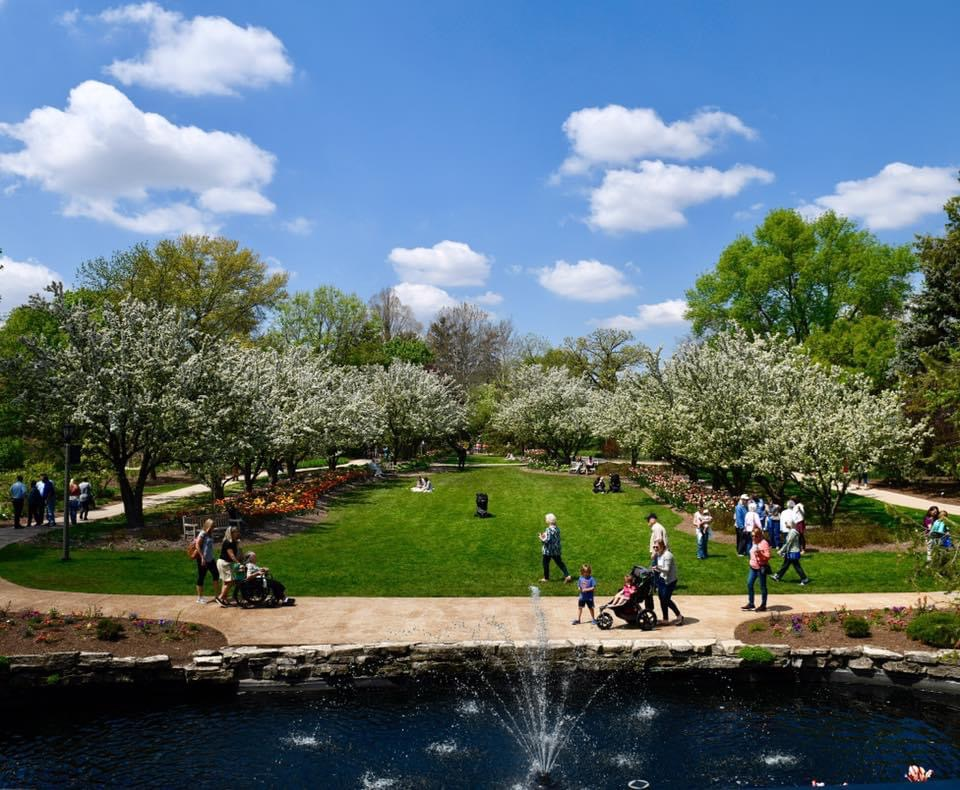
- Lilacia Park

- Flag Seal
- Nickname: The Lilac Village
- Location of Lombard in DuPage County, Illinois.
- Coordinates: 41°52′34″N 88°00′50″W
- Country: United States
- State: Illinois
- County: DuPage
- Townships: York, Bloomingdale, Milton, Addison
- Incorporated: 1869

Government
  - Type: Council–manager
  - Village President: Anthony Puccio

Area
  - Total: 10.41 sq mi (26.95 km^{2})
  - Land: 10.22 sq mi (26.47 km^{2})
  - Water: 0.19 sq mi (0.48 km^{2})
- Elevation: 728 ft (222 m)

Population (2020)
  - Total: 44,476
  - Density: 4,351.7/sq mi (1,680.19/km^{2})
- Demonym: Lombardian
- Time zone: UTC-6 (Central)
  - Summer (DST): UTC-5 (Central)
- ZIP code: 60148
- Area code(s): 630 and 331
- FIPS code: 17-44407
- GNIS feature ID: 2398468
- Website: villageoflombard.org

Lombard is a village in DuPage County, Illinois, United States, and a suburb of Chicago. The population was 44,476 at the 2020 census.

== History ==
Lombard was originally named "Babcock's Grove", after the Babcock brothers, early settlers along the DuPage River. It was renamed for a real estate developer who mapped out plans for the settlement in 1868.

Sheldon and Harriet Peck moved from Onondaga, New York, to this area in 1837 to farm 80 acres (320,000 m^{2}) of land. In addition, Peck was an artist and primitive portrait painter who traveled to clients across northeastern Illinois. The Peck house also served as the area's first school and has been restored by the Lombard Historical Society. In 2011, the Peck House was inducted into the National Park Service's Network to Freedom—a list of verified Underground Railroad locations.

The 1848 arrival of the Galena and Chicago Union Railroad provided local farmers and merchants rail access to Chicago, and commercial buildings soon sprang up around the train station. Lombard was officially incorporated in 1869, named after Chicago banker and real estate developer Josia Lewis Lombard.

=== Women's rights ===
On April 6, 1891, Ellen A. Martin led a group of women to the voting place at the general store. She demanded that the three male election judges allow the women to vote. The judges were so surprised that one of them had a "spasm," one leaned against the wall for support, and the other fell backwards into a barrel of flour. They acquiesced to Ellen, but fundamentally did not want to let the women vote, so a county judge was asked to decide. He agreed that the women were right. Ellen Martin then became the first woman in Illinois to vote, and one of the first in the entire U.S. In 1916 Illinois women could vote in national elections, but the 19th Amendment (the Women's Suffrage Amendment) was not passed until 1920.

In 2008, Lombard declared April 6 to be "Ellen Martin Day" in commemoration of Ms. Martin's historic victory for women's suffrage.

=== Little Orphan Annie House ===
William LeRoy built a home in the Italianate style on Lombard's Main Street in 1881. LeRoy specialized in making artificial limbs for civil war veterans and lived in this house until 1900. The house would eventually become the home of Harold Gray's parents and the studio of Harold Gray, the originator of Little Orphan Annie cartoon strip. Harold Gray used the home's study to work on the Annie cartoons, and some features of the house are drawn into some of his cartoons, such as the grand staircase and the outer deck. Gray lived at 215 S. Stewart Ave in Lombard at this time. Later, he remarried and moved to the east coast. Harold Gray was a charter member of Lombard Masonic Lodge #1098, A.F. & A.M. in 1923.

=== The Lilac Village ===
In 1927, the estate of Colonel William Plum, a local resident, was bequeathed to the village. The Plum property included his home, which became the site of the original Helen M. Plum Memorial Library (decommissioned in 2023), and a large garden containing 200 varieties of lilac bushes. This garden became a public park, Lilacia Park.

== Geography ==
METX105 and METX90 (on the rear) haul two Illinois Central EMUs through Lombard

According to the 2021 census gazetteer files, Lombard has a total area of 10.41 square miles (26.96 km^{2}), of which 10.22 square miles (26.47 km^{2}) (or 98.21%) is land and 0.19 square miles (0.49 km^{2}) (or 1.79%) is water.

== Demographics ==
Historical population
Census	Pop.	Note	%±
1880	378		—
1890	515		36.2%
1900	590		14.6%
1910	883		49.7%
1920	1,331		50.7%
1930	6,197		365.6%
1940	7,075		14.2%
1950	9,817		38.8%
1960	22,561		129.8%
1970	34,043		50.9%
1980	36,879		8.3%
1990	39,408		6.9%
2000	42,322		7.4%
2010	43,165		2.0%
2020	44,476		3.0%
U.S. Decennial Census

=== Racial and ethnic composition ===
Lombard village, Illinois – Racial and ethnic composition Note: the US Census treats Hispanic/Latino as an ethnic category. This table excludes Latinos from the racial categories and assigns them to a separate category. Hispanics/Latinos may be of any race.
Race / Ethnicity (NH = Non-Hispanic)	Pop 2000	Pop 2010	Pop 2020	% 2000	% 2010	% 2020
White alone (NH)	35,591	32,790	30,503	84.10%	75.96%	68.58%
Black or African American alone (NH)	1,125	1,925	2,014	2.66%	4.46%	4.53%
Native American or Alaska Native alone (NH)	40	24	52	0.09%	0.06%	0.12%
Asian alone (NH)	2,970	4,207	5,821	7.02%	9.75%	13.09%
Pacific Islander alone (NH)	6	4	4	0.01%	0.01%	0.01%
Other race alone (NH)	19	58	138	0.04%	0.13%	0.31%
Mixed race or Multiracial (NH)	559	670	1,423	1.32%	1.55%	3.20%
Hispanic or Latino (any race)	2,012	3,487	4,521	4.75%	8.08%	10.17%
Total	42,322	43,165	44,476	99.99%	100.00%	100.01%

=== 2020 census ===
As of the 2020 census, Lombard had a population of 44,476, with 18,032 households and 10,914 families residing in the village. The population density was 4,274.07 inhabitants per square mile (1,650.23/km^{2}). There were 19,150 housing units at an average density of 1,840.28 per square mile (710.54/km^{2}).

The median age was 40.1 years. 20.0% of residents were under the age of 18 and 17.9% of residents were 65 years of age or older. For every 100 females there were 92.6 males, and for every 100 females age 18 and over there were 89.9 males age 18 and over.

100.0% of residents lived in urban areas, while 0.0% lived in rural areas.

There were 18,032 households in Lombard, of which 27.3% had children under the age of 18 living in them. Of all households, 49.2% were married-couple households, 18.0% were households with a male householder and no spouse or partner present, and 27.0% were households with a female householder and no spouse or partner present. About 30.9% of all households were made up of individuals and 11.7% had someone living alone who was 65 years of age or older.

There were 19,150 housing units, of which 5.8% were vacant. The homeowner vacancy rate was 1.1% and the rental vacancy rate was 10.1%.

=== 2000 census ===
Demographics (2000)
Demographic	Proportion
White	81.02%
Black	9.70%
Hispanic	4.75%
Asian	7.05%
Islander	0.02%
Native	0.15%
Other	1.43%

=== Income and poverty ===
The median income for a household in the village was $86,167, and the median income for a family was $100,420. Males had a median income of $58,398 versus $40,411 for females. The per capita income for the village was $41,154. About 3.5% of families and 5.6% of the population were below the poverty line, including 4.5% of those under age 18 and 5.9% of those age 65 or over.

== Economy ==
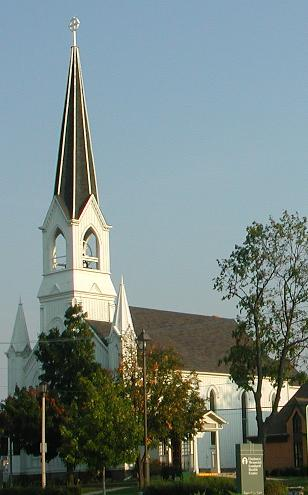
Lombard's Maple Street Chapel, built in 1870, served as the village's first town hall and library.

Rastus at Lilacia Park Historic District

Lombard’s economy is anchored by retail, manufacturing, hospitality, and professional services. The village’s Annual Comprehensive Financial Report for fiscal year 2024 reported a 9.79% increase in total equalized assessed valuation (EAV), with $5.06 million in new construction and $339,414 in annexations added to the tax base. The capital program included streetscape improvements to St. Charles Road and the opening of Prairie Place Park under an intergovernmental agreement with the Lombard Park District.

As of 2024, the ten largest employers in Lombard were:

Principal Employers – 2024
Rank	Employer	Employees
1	Life Safety Hardware	4,500
2	Program Productions	3,300
3	Microsystems	1,000
4	Mariano's	600
5	Dashiell Corporation	500
6	Visionix	400
7	The Westin Chicago Lombard	400
8	Von Maur	344
9	Viskase Co. Inc.	300
10	Jewel-Osco	300

The 2024 report cited an unemployment rate of approximately 4.2%, in line with the DuPage County average and below the statewide rate. Lombard continues to see reinvestment and redevelopment along the Yorktown Center corridor, including new residential and mixed-use projects such as Lilac Station, Yorktown Reserve, and the Summit at Yorktown.

== Arts and culture ==
Since 1930, Lombard has hosted an annual Lilac Festival and parade in May. "Lilac Time in Lombard," is a 16-day festival ending in mid-May. It starts with the Lilac Queen coronation and her court. Many lilac themed events take place, including a formal ball, concerts, wine and beer tasting in the park, a Mothers' Day Brunch, an arts and crafts fair, and tours of the park. The grand finale is Lombard's Lilac Festival Parade. The first Lilac Princess in 1930 was Adeline Fleege. Big Idea, the company behind VeggieTales was originally based in Lombard.

== Government ==
Lombard is a non-home-rule municipality with a council–manager form of government. The Village President and six trustees are elected to four-year terms.

== Education ==
Lombard's high schools belong to Glenbard Township High School District 87. They are shared with the neighboring town of Glen Ellyn, thus the creation of the portmanteau word "Glenbard". Lombard's elementary and middle schools (K-8) belong to Lombard School District 44 or DuPage School District 45.

Glenbard East High School is located in Lombard.

Private schools include Montini Catholic High School and the College Preparatory School of America (CPSA).

== Infrastructure ==
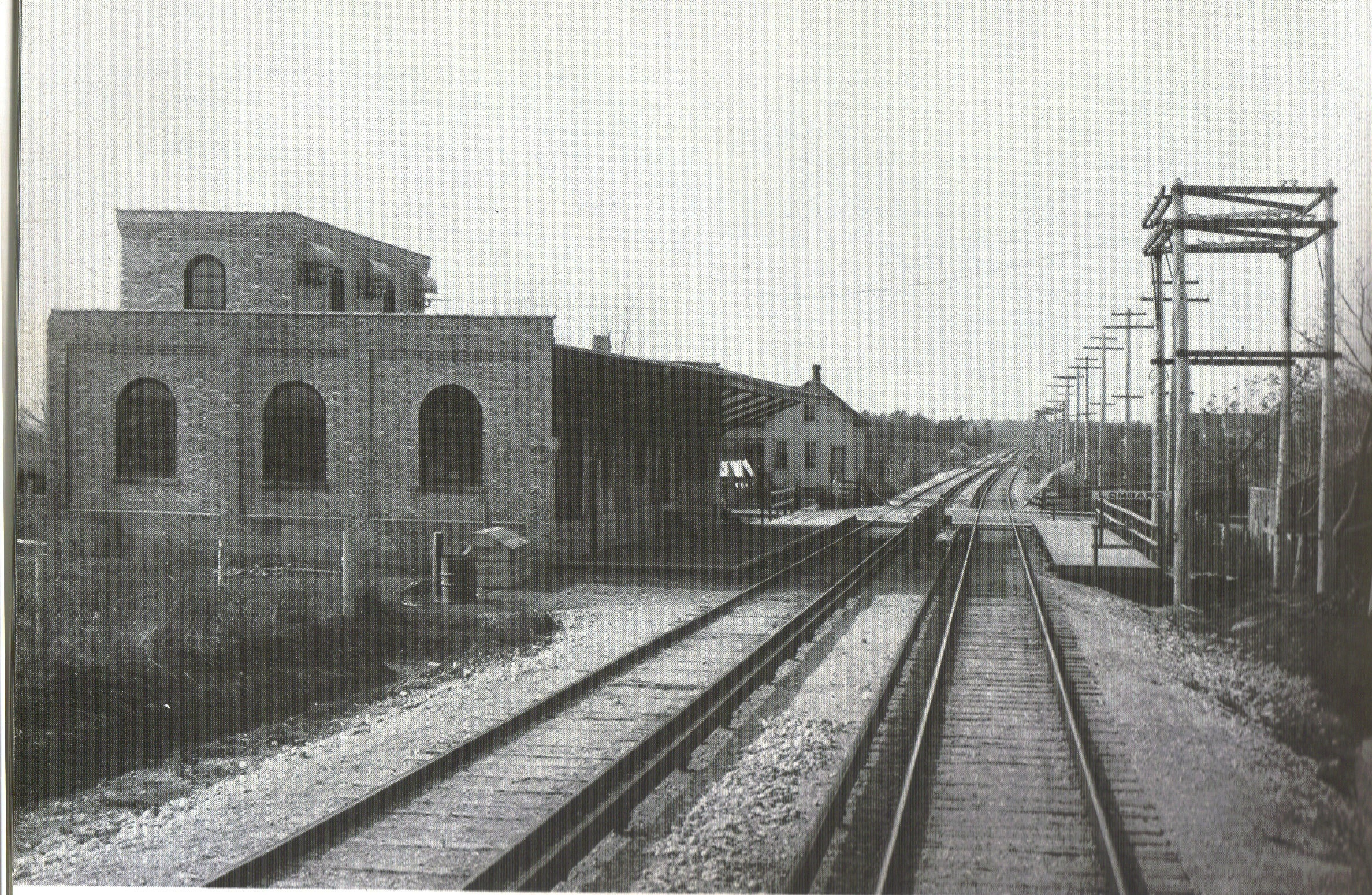
The former train station for the Chicago Aurora and Elgin Railroad at Main Street, pictured in 1902

Lombard is served by Metra's Union Pacific West Line, which runs from the Ogilvie Transportation Center out to Elburn, Illinois over the old Chicago and Northwestern Railway trackage. Lombard's also served by I-88 / Illinois 110 and I-355 as well as Illinois Routes 38, 53, 56, and 64.

Formerly, it was also served by trains of the Chicago Aurora and Elgin Railroad (with commuter stops at Stewart Ave, Main St, Brewster Ave and Westmore/Meyers Road) and the Chicago Great Western Railway. These former railroads have been preserved as multiple use recreational trails (Illinois Prairie Path and Great Western Trail).

Pace provides bus service on multiple routes connecting Lombard to Naperville, Cicero, and other destinations. The Yorktown Center serves as a hub for bus routes in the area.

== Notable people ==
- Winifred Bonfils, newspaper journalist and columnist
- Dallas Frueh, racing driver
- Russ Gamester, racing driver
- Harold Gray, cartoonist and creator of Little Orphan Annie
- Tom Higgenson, founder of Plain White T's, grew up in Lombard
- Ted Kaczynski, American terrorist, also known as the Unabomber
- James Marcello, reputed Mafia leader
- Ellen Annette Martin, first woman to vote in Illinois in 1891
- Mary Elizabeth Mastrantonio, actor
- Sheldon Peck, folk artist and abolitionist
- Jill Pizzotti, collegiate basketball coach
- Mary Doria Russell, author of five novels
- Rick Santelli, CNBC commentator
- Bob Schacht, racing driver
- Daniel M. Tani, NASA astronaut
- Charles Tilly, scholar
- Doug Walker, film critic and comedian
- Timothy Zahn, science-fiction author

== See also ==
- Sacred Heart Church (Lombard, Illinois)
